= LGBTQ rights by country or territory =

Worldwide laws regarding same-sex intercourse, unions and expression. Same-sex intercourse legal. Recognition of unions: Marriage / Extraterritorial marriage^{2}; Civil unions / Limited domestic; Limited foreign / Optional certification; Same-sex intercourse illegal. Penalties: Death / Prison; death not enforced; Death under militias / Prison, with arrests or detention; Prison, not enforced^{1}; Same-sex intercourse Restricted/Ambiguous. Depends are: No data / Restriction of expression, not enforced; Restriction of association with arrests or detention^{1}No imprisonment in the past three years or moratorium on law.^{2}Marriage not available locally. Some jurisdictions may perform other types of partnerships.

LGBTQI+ rights at the United Nations: Neither / States which did not support either declaration; Non-member states / States that are not voting members of the United Nations; Oppose / States which supported an opposing declaration in 2008 and continued their opposition in 2011; Subsequent member / South Sudan, did not exist in 2008; Support / States which supported the LGBTQ rights declaration in the General Assembly or on the Human Rights Council in 2008 or 2011

Rights affecting lesbian, gay, bisexual, transgender and queer (LGBTQ) people vary greatly by country or jurisdiction—encompassing everything from the legal recognition of same-sex marriage to the death penalty for homosexuality.

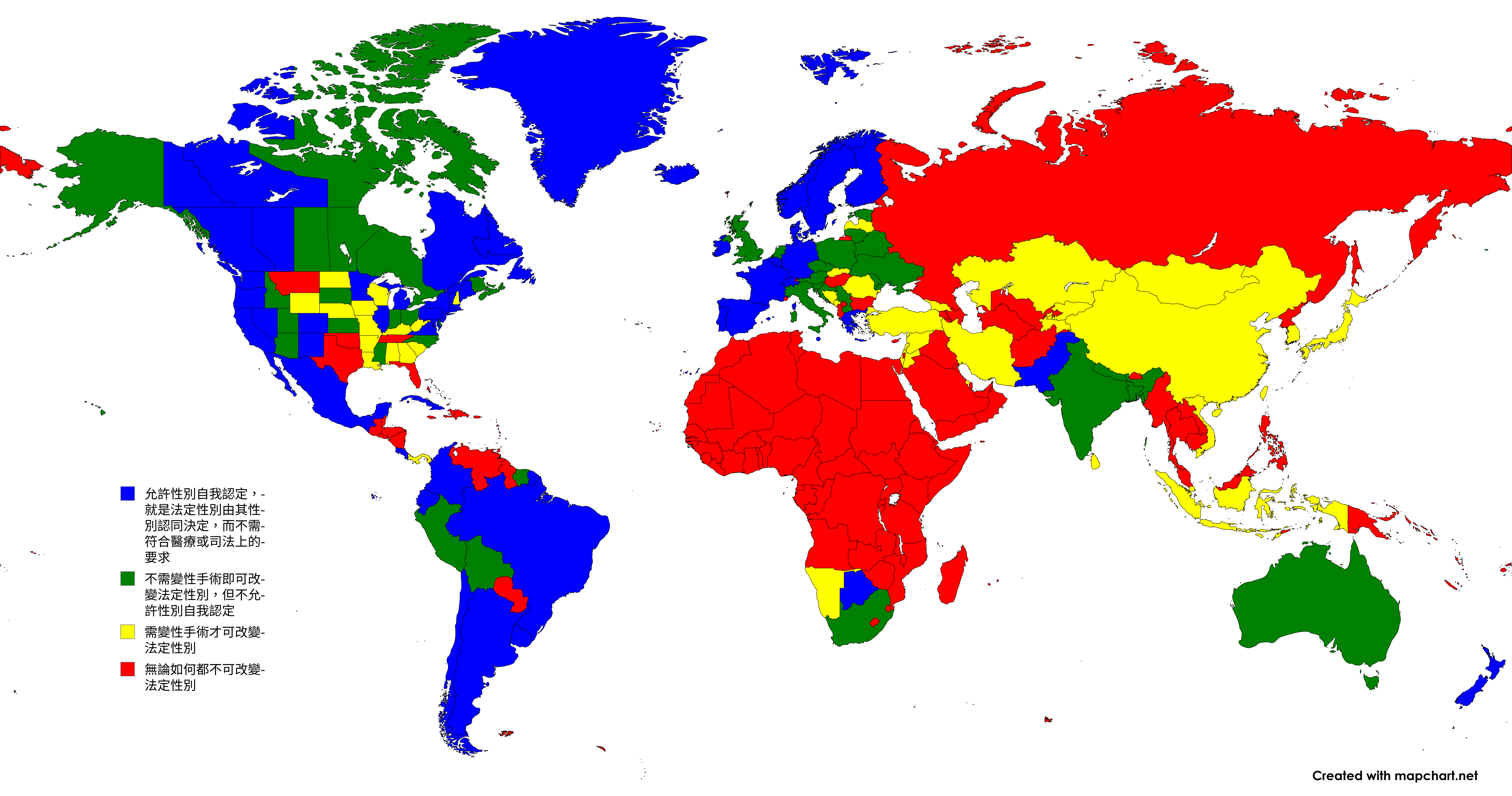
Laws concerning gender identity-expression by country or territory in 2025: Gender self-identification Legal identity change, surgery not required, but not gender self-identification Legal identity change, surgery required No legal identity change

Notably, as of January 2025, 38 countries recognize same-sex marriage. By contrast, not counting non-state actors and extrajudicial killings, only two countries are believed to impose the death penalty on consensual same-sex sexual acts: Iran and Afghanistan. The death penalty is officially law, but generally not practiced, in Mauritania, Saudi Arabia, and Somalia (in the autonomous state of Jubaland). LGBTQ people also face extrajudicial killings in the Russian region of Chechnya. Sudan rescinded its unenforced death penalty for anal sex (hetero- or homosexual) in 2020. Fifteen countries have stoning on the books as a penalty for adultery, which (in light of the illegality of gay marriage in those countries) would by default include gay sex, but this is enforced by the legal authorities in Iran and Nigeria (in the northern third of the country).

In 2011, the United Nations Human Rights Council passed its first resolution recognizing LGBTQ rights, following which the Office of the United Nations High Commissioner for Human Rights issued a report documenting violations of the rights of LGBTQ people, including hate crimes, criminalization of homosexual activity, and discrimination. Following the issuance of the report, the United Nations urged all countries which had not yet done so to enact laws protecting basic LGBTQ rights. A 2022 study found that LGBTQ rights (as measured by ILGA-Europe's Rainbow Index) were correlated with less HIV/AIDS incidence among gay and bisexual men independently of risky sexual behavior.

The 2023 Equaldex Equality Index ranks the Nordic countries, Chile, Uruguay, Canada, the Benelux countries, Spain, Andorra, and Malta among the best for LGBTQ rights. The index ranks Senegal, Oman, Brunei, Afghanistan, Somalia, Eritrea, Gambia, and Iran among the worst.

LGBT rights are supported by various international religious organizations, including progressive Christian denominations, and progressive Jewish organizations.

== Scope of laws ==
Laws that affect LGBTQ people include, but are not limited to, the following:

- laws concerning the recognition of same-sex relationships, including same-sex marriage, civil unions, and domestic partnerships
- laws concerning same-sex parenting, including same-sex adoption
- anti-discrimination laws in employment, housing, education, public accommodations
- anti-bullying legislation to protect LGBTQ children at school
- hate crime laws imposing enhanced criminal penalties for prejudice-motivated violence against LGBTQ people
- bathroom bills affecting access to sex-segregated facilities by transgender people
- laws related to sexual orientation and military service
- laws concerning access to assisted reproductive technology
- sodomy laws that penalize consensual same-sex sexual activity that may or may not target homosexuals, males or males and females, or leave some homosexual acts legal
- adultery laws that same-sex couples are subject to
- age of consent laws that may impose higher ages for same-sex sexual activity
- laws regarding donation of blood, corneas, and other tissues by men who have sex with men
- laws concerning access to gender-affirming surgery and gender-affirming hormone replacement therapy
- legal recognition and accommodation of the affirmed gender

== History of LGBTQ-related laws ==
=== Ancient India ===
In ancient India, Ayoni or non-vaginal sex of all types was punishable in the Arthashastra. Homosexual acts were, however, treated as a smaller offence punishable by a fine, while unlawful heterosexual sex carried much harsher punishment. The Dharmsastras, especially the later ones like the Vashistha Dharmasutra, prescribed against non-vaginal sex. The Yājñavalkya Smṛti prescribed fines for such acts including those with other men. Manusmriti prescribed light punishments for such acts. Vanita stated that the verses about punishment for a sex between a woman and her maiden was due to its strong emphasis on a maiden's sexual purity.

=== Ancient Israel ===
The ancient Law of Moses (the Torah) forbids people from lying with people of the same sex (i.e., from having intercourse) in Leviticus 18 and gives a story of attempted homosexual rape in Genesis 19, in the story of Sodom and Gomorrah, after which the cities were soon destroyed with "brimstone and fire, from the Lord" and the death penalty was prescribed to its inhabitants – and to Lot's wife, who was turned into a pillar of salt because she turned back to watch the cities' destruction. In Deuteronomy 22:5, cross-dressing is condemned as "abominable".

=== Assyria ===
In Assyrian society, sex crimes were punished identically whether they were homosexual or heterosexual. An individual faced no punishment for penetrating someone of equal social class, a cult prostitute, or with someone whose gender roles were not considered solidly masculine. Such sexual relations were even seen as good fortune, with an Akkadian tablet, the Šumma ālu, reading, "If a man copulates with his equal from the rear, he becomes the leader among his peers and brothers". However, homosexual relationships with fellow soldiers, slaves, royal attendants, or those where a social better was submissive or penetrated, were treated as bad omens.

Middle Assyrian Law Codes dating 1075 BC has a particularly harsh law for homosexuality in the military, which reads: "If a man have intercourse with his brother-in-arms, they shall turn him into a eunuch." A similar law code reads, "If a seignior lay with his neighbor, when they have prosecuted him (and) convicted him, they shall lie with him (and) turn him into a eunuch". This law code condemns a situation that involves homosexual rape. Any Assyrian male could visit a prostitute or lie with another male, just as long as false rumors or forced sex were not involved with another male.

=== Ancient Rome ===
In ancient Rome, the bodies of citizen youths were strictly off-limits, and the Lex Scantinia imposed penalties on those who committed a sex crime (stuprum) against a freeborn male minor. Acceptable same-sex partners were males excluded from legal protections as citizens: slaves, male prostitutes, and the infames, entertainers or others who might be technically free but whose lifestyles set them outside the law.

A male citizen who willingly performed oral sex or received anal sex was disparaged, but there is only limited evidence of legal penalties against these men. In courtroom and political rhetoric, charges of effeminacy and passive sexual behaviors were directed particularly at "democratic" politicians (populares) such as Julius Caesar and Mark Antony.

Roman law addressed the rape of a male citizen as early as the 2nd century BC when it was ruled that even a man who was "disreputable and questionable" had the same right as other citizens not to have his body subjected to forced sex. A law probably dating to the dictatorship of Julius Caesar defined rape as forced sex against "boy, woman, or anyone"; the rapist was subject to execution, a rare penalty in Roman law. A male classified as infamis, such as a prostitute or actor, could not as a matter of law be raped, nor could a slave, who was legally classified as property; the slave's owner, however, could prosecute the rapist for property damage.

In the Roman army of the Republic, sex among fellow soldiers violated the decorum against intercourse with citizens and was subject to harsh penalties, including death, as a violation of military discipline. The Greek historian Polybius (2nd century BC) lists deserters, thieves, perjurers, and "...on young men who have abused their persons" as subject to the fustuarium, clubbing to death. Ancient sources are most concerned with the effects of sexual harassment by officers, but the young soldier who brought an accusation against his superior needed to show that he had not willingly taken the passive role or prostituted himself. Soldiers were free to have relations with their male slaves; the use of a fellow citizen-soldier's body was prohibited, not homosexual behaviors per se. By the late Republic and throughout the Imperial period, there is increasing evidence that men whose lifestyle marked them as "homosexual" in the modern sense served openly.

Although Roman law did not recognize marriage between men, and in general Romans regarded marriage as a heterosexual union with the primary purpose of producing children, in the early Imperial period some male couples were celebrating traditional marriage rites. Juvenal remarks with disapproval that his friends often attended such ceremonies. The emperor Nero had two marriages to men, once as the bride (with a freedman Pythagoras) and once as the groom. His consort Sporus appeared in public as Nero's wife wearing the regalia that was customary for the Roman empress.

Apart from measures to protect the prerogatives of citizens, the prosecution of homosexuality as a general crime began in the 3rd century of the Christian era when male prostitution was banned by Philip the Arab. By the end of the 4th century, after the Roman Empire had come under Christian rule, passive homosexuality was punishable by burning. "Death by sword" was the punishment for a "man coupling like a woman" under the Theodosian Code. Under Justinian, all same-sex acts, passive or active, no matter who the partners are, were declared contrary to nature and punishable by death.

=== British Empire ===
The United Kingdom introduced anti-homosexuality laws throughout its colonies, particularly in the 19th century when the British Empire was at its peak. As of 2018, more than half of the 71 countries that criminalised homosexuality were former British colonies or protectorates.

In 1861, the British Empire introduced Section 377 of the British Colonial Penal Code, outlawing consensual sexual activity between same-sex couples as well as labelling third gender communities such as the apwint people and Hijra as "outlaw tribes". This law was intended to criminalise acts "against the order of nature". Section 377 was used to prosecute people engaging in oral and anal sex along with homosexual activity.

Today, Section 377 still exists in some former British colonies:

- Bangladesh
- Malaysia
- Myanmar
- Pakistan
- Sri Lanka (as Section 365)

In addition to Section 377, the United Kingdom also introduced a number of laws targeting gender non-conformity throughout its colonies. In 1861, authorities of the North-Western Provinces (NWP) sought to enact a 'special law' against Hijra people in order to criminalise their identity. The Hijra were included in the Criminal Tribes Act (1871) and were monitored with the hope of eliminating their culture. Due to the passage of the Criminal Tribes Act (1871), Hijra people could not possess children.

While significant progress has been made to reverse these laws, the majority of the countries of the Commonwealth of Nations, formerly known as the British Commonwealth, still criminalise sexual acts between consenting adults of the same sex and other forms of sexual orientation, gender identity and expression. Homosexual activity remains a criminal offence in 29 of the 56 sovereign states of the Commonwealth; and legal in only 27. In 3 of these states, homosexual activity is punishable by death.

LGBTQ communities still face significant discrimination due to the influence of colonialism in former British colonies, despite these communities being accepted prior to British colonialism. In the Indic cultural sphere, references to a third sex can be found throughout the texts of India's religious traditions like Jainism and Buddhism as well as the Kama Sutra. The foundational work of Hindu law, the Manu Smriti (c. 200 BC–200 AD) explains humans as belonging to one of three biological sexes, indicating a belief that transsexuality was an inherent trait.

=== Netherlands ===
In 2001, the Netherlands was the first country in the world to legalize same-sex marriage.

== Global LGBTQ rights maps ==
Note that for simplicity the table below does not distinguish between 'legal' and 'lawful'. An action can only be legal or illegal where a specific law has been passed.

Laws regarding same-sex sexuality by country or territory

Worldwide laws regarding same-sex intercourse, unions and expression. Same-sex intercourse legal. Recognition of unions: Marriage / Extraterritorial marriage^{2}; Civil unions / Limited domestic; Limited foreign / Optional certification; Same-sex intercourse illegal. Penalties: Death / Prison; death not enforced; Death under militias / Prison, with arrests or detention; Prison, not enforced^{1}; Same-sex intercourse Restricted/Ambiguous. Depends are: No data / Restriction of expression, not enforced; Restriction of association with arrests or detention^{1}No imprisonment in the past three years or moratorium on law.^{2}Marriage not available locally. Some jurisdictions may perform other types of partnerships.

LGBT rights at the United Nations

Support Countries which have signed a General Assembly declaration of LGBT rights or sponsored the Human Rights Council's 2011 resolution on LGBT rights (96 members) Oppose Countries which signed a 2008 statement opposing LGBT rights (initially 57 members, now 54 members after withdrawal of Fiji, Rwanda and Sierra Leone) Neither Countries which, as regards the UN, have expressed neither official support nor opposition to LGBT rights (44 members)

Homosexual "propaganda" laws by country or territory

Homosexual "propaganda" laws by country or territory Countries or territories that do not have homosexual "propaganda" laws Fine Imprisonment

Decriminalization of same-sex sexual intercourse by country or territory

1791–1850 1850–1945 1946–1989 1990–present Unknown date of legalization of same-sex intercourse Same-sex sexual intercourse always legal Still criminalized

Equalization of age of consent laws for same-sex couples by country or territory

1790–1829 1830–1839 1840–1859 1860–1869 1870–1879 1880–1889 1890–1929 1930–1939 1940–1949^{1} 1950–1959 1960–1969 1970–1979 1980–1989 1990–1999 2000–2009 2010–2019 2020–present Unknown date for equal age of consent laws for opposite and same-sex couples No consent laws/equal age of consent laws always equal for opposite and same-sex couples Unequal age of consent laws for same-sex couples Same-sex sexual intercourse illegal^{1}During World War II, Nazi Germany annexed or occupied territory, extending Germany's laws against same-sex sexual intercourse. Age of consent was previously equalized for same-sex couples in the following countries or territories before the war: Belluno (legal in 1890), Trentino-Alto Adige/Südtirol (legal in 1890), Friuli-Venezia Giulia (legal in 1890), and Poland (decriminalized in 1932). During World War II Germany did not consistently enforce anti-homosexual laws in all occupied countries. All countries and territories listed that were annexed or established into reichskommissariats by Nazi Germany during World War II were restored as independent countries or reincorporated into their previous countries during or after the war and thus re-legalized equal age of consent laws for same-sex couples in those areas.

Legal status of same-sex marriage

Marriage open to same-sex couples Mixed jurisdiction: marriage recognized by the state but not by tribal government for residents who are members of the tribe Legislation or binding domestic court ruling establishing same-sex marriage, but marriage is not yet provided for Same-sex marriage recognized with full rights when performed in certain other jurisdictions Civil unions or domestic partnerships Limited legal recognition Local certification without legal force Limited recognition of marriage performed in certain other jurisdictions (residency rights for spouses) Other countries where same-sex unions are not legally recognized

Legal status of adoption by same-sex couples by country or territory

Joint adoption allowed Second-parent adoption allowed No laws allowing adoption by same-sex couples and no same-sex marriage Same-sex marriage but adoption by married same-sex couples not allowed

LGBTQ service in national militaries by country or territory

All LGBT people can serve GBT men can serve LGB people can serve GB men can serve Ambiguous/unknown policy LGBT people are banned from serving No military

Employment discrimination laws by sexual orientation or gender identity by country or territory

Sexual orientation and gender identity: all employment Sexual orientation with anti–employment discrimination ordinance and gender identity solely in public employment Sexual orientation: all employment Gender identity: all employment Sexual orientation and gender identity: federal public employment and federal contractors Sexual orientation and gender identity: public employment Sexual orientation: public employment No national-level employment laws covering sexual orientation or gender identity

Anti-discrimination laws covering goods and services by sexual orientation and/or gender identity by country or territory

Countries and territories with LGBT anti-discrimination laws in goods and services Sexual orientation and gender identity covered Sexual orientation covered Gender identity covered No national or local level anti-discrimination laws covering sexual orientation and/or gender identity in goods and services

Constitutional discrimination laws by sexual orientation and/or gender identity by country or territory

Sexual orientation and gender identity covered Sexual orientation covered Gender identity covered No national or local level constitutional discrimination laws covering sexual orientation and/or gender identity

LGBTQ hate crime laws by country or territory

Sexual orientation and gender identity hate crime laws Sexual orientation hate crime laws No LGBT hate crime laws

Incitement to hatred based on sexual orientation and gender identity prohibited by country or territory

Incitement to hatred based on sexual orientation and gender identity prohibited Incitement to hatred based on sexual orientation prohibited No prohibition on incitement to hatred based on sexual orientation and gender identity

Legal status on conversion therapy for minors on the basis of sexual orientation and gender identity by country or territory

Ban on conversion therapy on the basis of sexual orientation and gender identity De facto ban on conversion therapy No ban on conversion therapy

Immigration equality by country or territory

Recognition of same-sex couples in national immigration laws Unknown/ambiguous

Bans on same-sex unions by country or territory

No specific prohibition of same-sex marriages or unions Same-sex marriage banned by secular constitution Same-sex marriage banned by constitutionally mandated religious law

Blood donation policies for men who have sex with men by country or territory

Blood donation policies for men who have sex with men Men who have sex with men may donate blood; No deferral Men who have sex with men may donate blood; Temporary deferral Men who have sex with men may not donate blood; Permanent deferral No Data

Blood donation policies for female sex partners of men who have sex with men by country or territory

Blood donation policies for female sex partners of men who have sex with men Female sex partners of men who have sex with men may donate blood; No deferral Female sex partners of men who have sex with men may donate blood; Temporary deferral Female sex partners of men who have sex with men may not donate blood; Permanent deferral No Data

Laws concerning gender identity-expression by country or territory

Legal identity change, surgery not required Legal identity change, surgery required No legal identity change Unknown/ambiguous

Legal recognition of non-binary genders and third gender

Nonbinary / third gender available as voluntary opt-in Opt-in for foreign-born nationals if recognized in country of origin Opt-in for intersex people only Standard for third gender Standard for intersex Nonbinary / third gender not legally recognized / no data

== Timeline ==
Decriminalization of same-sex sexual practices timeline
	Countries/Territories/States
Never been illegal/Never criminalized	List: Aruba, Netherlands; Benin; Cambodia; Central African Republic; Cocos (Keeling) Islands, Australia; (Republic of the Congo) Congo; (Democratic Republic of the Congo) DR Congo; Christmas Island, Australia; Curaçao, Netherlands; Djibouti; Equatorial Guinea; French Polynesia, France; Indonesia (Note: No spesific laws nationwide, except in the province of Aceh); Ivory Coast; Laos; Madagascar; Mayotte, France; (Federated States of Micronesia) Micronesia; New Caledonia, France; North Korea; Rwanda; Sint Maarten, Netherlands; South Korea; Philippines; Vietnam; Wallis and Futuna, France
18th century	List: 1791: Andorra; Kingdom of France (includes Guadeloupe, French Guiana, Martinique, Réunion, San Barthélemy, Saint Martin, and Saint Pierre and Miquelon); Saint-Domingue (Haiti); 1793: Monaco; 1794: Luxembourg; 1795: Belgium; 1798: (Canton of Geneva) Geneva, Switzerland; Ticino, Switzerland; Vaud, Switzerland; Valais, Switzerland
19th century	List: 1811: Netherlands; 1822: Dominican Republic; El Salvador; 1830: Empire of Brazil; 1832: Bolivia; 1853: Argentina; 1858: Ottoman Empire (Turkey); 1864: San Marino; 1869: Dutch Guiana (Suriname); 1871: Guatemala; Mexico; 1882: Empire of Japan; 1890: Kingdom of Italy; Vatican City; 1899: Honduras
20th century	List: 1912: (Taiwan) Republic of China; 1924: Peru; 1933: Denmark (includes Greenland and the Faroe Islands); 1932: Poland; 1934: Uruguay; 1940: Kingdom of Iceland; 1942: Switzerland (nationwide); 1944: Sweden; 1951: Greece; Jordan; West Bank, Palestine; 1956: Thailand; 1961: Hungary; 1962: (Czech Republic) (Slovakia) Czechoslovakia; Illinois, United States; 1967: England and Wales, United Kingdom; 1968: Bulgaria; East Germany; 1969: Canada; West Germany; 1971: Austria; Connecticut, United States; Costa Rica; Finland; 1972: Colorado, United States; Oregon, United States; Norway; 1973: Delaware, United States; Hawaii, United States; Malta; North Dakota, United States; 1974: Massachusetts, United States; Ohio, United States; 1975: (Timor-Leste) East Timor; New Hampshire, United States; New Mexico, United States; South Australia, Australia; 1976: Australian Capital Territory, Australia; Bahrain; California, United States; Indiana, United States; Maine, United States; (Washington (state)) Washington, United States; West Virginia, United States; 1977: Socialist Republic of Croatia; Socialist Republic of Montenegro; Socialist Republic of Slovenia; South Dakota, United States; Vermont, United States; Wyoming, United States; 1978: Guam, United States; Iowa, United States; Nebraska, United States; New Jersey, United States; 1979: Cuba; Spain; 1980: Alaska, United States; American Samoa, United States; (New York (state)) New York, United States; Pennsylvania, United States; 1981: Colombia; Scotland, United Kingdom; (Victoria (state)) Victoria, Australia; 1982: Northern Ireland, United Kingdom; 1983: Guernsey, United Kingdom; Northern Mariana Islands, United States; Northern Territory, Australia; Portugal; Wisconsin, United States; 1984: New South Wales, Australia; 1985: United States Virgin Islands, United States; 1986: New Zealand; 1988: Israel; 1989: Falkland Islands, United Kingdom; Liechtenstein; 1990: Jersey, United Kingdom; Paraguay; Western Australia, Australia; 1991: (The Bahamas) Bahamas; Abkhazia; British Hong Kong; Queensland, Australia; South Ossetia; Ukraine; 1992: Estonia; Isle of Man, United Kingdom; Kentucky, United States; Latvia; 1993: (Washington, D.C.) District of Columbia, United States; Gibraltar, United Kingdom; Guinea-Bissau; (Republic of Ireland) Ireland; Lithuania; Mongolia; Nevada, United States; Norfolk Island, Australia; Russia (Note: De facto illegal in Chechnya); 1994: Autonomous Province of Kosovo and Metohija; Belarus; Bermuda, United Kingdom; Republic of Serbia; 1995: Albania; Moldova; 1996: Federation of Bosnia and Herzegovina, Bosnia and Herzegovina; Portuguese Macau; North Macedonia; Romania; Tennessee, United States; 1997: China; Ecuador; Montana, United States; Tasmania, Australia; Venezuela; 1998: Cyprus; (Georgia (U.S. state)) Georgia, United States; Kazakhstan; Kyrgyzstan; Republika Srpska, Bosnia and Herzegovina; Rhode Island, United States; South Africa; Tajikistan; 1999: Chile; Maryland, United States; 2000: Akrotiri and Dhekelia, United Kingdom; Azerbaijan; (Georgia (country)) Georgia
21st century	List: 2001: Anguilla, United Kingdom; Arizona, United States; Brčko District, Bosnia and Herzegovina; British Virgin Islands, United Kingdom; Cayman Islands, United Kingdom; Minnesota, United States; Montserrat, United Kingdom; (Ascension Island) Saint Helena, Ascension and Tristan da Cunha, United Kingdom; Pitcairn Islands, United Kingdom; Turks and Caicos Islands, United Kingdom; 2002: Arkansas, United States; Transnistria; 2003: Armenia; Tokelau, New Zealand; United States (nationwide); 2004: Cape Verde; 2005: Marshall Islands; 2007: Nepal; Vanuatu; 2008: Nicaragua; Panama; 2010: Fiji; 2012: Lesotho; São Tomé and Príncipe; 2014: Northern Cyprus; Palau; 2015: Mozambique; 2016: Belize; Nauru; Seychelles; 2018: India; 2019: Botswana; 2020: Gabon; 2021: Angola; Bhutan; 2022: Antigua and Barbuda; Barbados; Singapore; Saint Kitts and Nevis; 2023: Cook Islands, New Zealand; Mauritius; 2024: Dominica; Namibia; Niue, New Zealand; 2025: Saint Lucia
	Notes: Note that while this template lists several historical countries, such as the Kingdom of France, Czechoslovakia, East Germany, etc., for the sake of clarity, the flags shown are contemporary flags.; When a country has decriminalized, re-criminalized, and decriminalized again (e.g. Albania, Bulgaria, Spain, republics of the Soviet Union) only the later decriminalization date is included. Countries which have decriminalized and since re-criminalized (e.g. Iraq) are excluded.

== Laws by country or territory ==
Note: A country in this list is to be presumed to have equalized the age of consent at the same time as it decriminalized homosexual acts, unless otherwise noted.

=== Africa ===
==== Northern Africa ====
LGBTQ rights in:	Same-sex sexual activity	Recognition of same-sex unions	Same-sex marriage	Adoption by same-sex couples	LGBT people allowed to serve openly in military	Anti-discrimination laws concerning sexual orientation	Laws concerning gender identity/expression
Algeria	No Illegal since 11 June 1966; Penalty: Up to 3 years imprisonment with fines up to 10,000 dinars.	No	No	No	No	No	No
Canary Islands (Autonomous community of Spain)	Yes Legal since 9 November 1979 + UN decl. sign.	Yes De facto unions legal since 2003	Yes Legal since 2005	Yes Legal since 2005	Yes Spain responsible for defence	Yes Bans all anti-gay discrimination	Yes Since 2007, all documents can be amended to the recognised gender
Ceuta (Autonomous city of Spain)	Yes Legal since 9 November 1979 + UN decl. sign.	Yes De facto union since 1998	Yes Legal since 2005	Yes Legal since 2005	Yes Spain responsible for defence	Yes Bans all anti-gay discrimination	Yes Since 2007, all documents can be amended to the recognised gender
Egypt	Yes De Jure Legal; No De facto illegal Penalty: Up to 17 years imprisonment.	No	No	No	No	No	Yes / No By law, approval of religious authorities (Al-Azhar Mosque or the Coptic Orthodox Church of Alexandria) must be obtained prior to surgical intervention.
Libya	No Illegal since 2 March 1954 (as Kingdom of Libya); Penalty: Up to 5 years in jail.	No	No	No	No	No	No
Madeira (Autonomous region of Portugal)	Yes Legal since 1 January 1983 + UN decl. sign.	Yes De facto union since 2001	Yes Legal since 2010	Yes Legal since 2016	Yes Portugal responsible for defence	Yes Bans all anti-gay discrimination.	Yes Since 2011, all documents can be amended to the recognised gender
Melilla (Autonomous city of Spain)	Yes Legal since 9 November 1979 + UN decl. sign.	Yes De facto union since 2008	Yes Legal since 2005	Yes Legal since 2005	Yes Spain responsible for defence	Yes Bans all anti-gay discrimination	Yes Since 2007, all documents can be amended to the recognised gender
Morocco (including Moroccan-occupied Western Sahara)	No Illegal since 17 June 1963; Penalty: Up to 3 to 6 years imprisonment with hard labour.	No	No	No	No	No	No
Sahrawi Arab Democratic Republic (Disputed territory; only Free Zone)	No Illegal since 27 February 1976	No	No	No	No	No	No
Sudan	No Illegal since 31 January 1991 (as Anglo-Egyptian Sudan); Penalty: Life imprisonment for a third offense of anal sex.	No	No	No	No	No	No
Tunisia	No Illegal since 1 January 1914 (as the Regency of Tunis); Penalty: 3 years imprisonment.	No	No	No	No	No	No

==== Western Africa ====
LGBTQ rights in:	Same-sex sexual activity	Recognition of same-sex unions	Same-sex marriage	Adoption by same-sex couples	LGBT people allowed to serve openly in military	Anti-discrimination laws concerning sexual orientation	Laws concerning gender identity/expression
Benin	Yes Legal (No laws against same-sex sexual activity have ever existed in the country); Equal age of consent since 2018.	No	No	No		Yes Bans some anti-gay discrimination.	
Burkina Faso	No Illegal since 1 September 2025; Penalty: 2 to 5 years imprisonment.	No	No Constitutional ban since 1991	No		Yes / No Limited protections.	
Cape Verde	Yes Legal since 1 March 2004 + UN decl. sign.	No	No	No		Yes Bans some anti-gay discrimination	
(The Gambia) Gambia	No Illegal since 1 January 1889 (as the Gambia Colony and Protectorate); Penalty: Up to life imprisonment.	No	No	No	No	No	No Forms of gender expression criminalized since 2013
Ghana	No Male illegal since 1 January 1893 (as the Gold Coast); Penalty: Up to 3 years imprisonment (repeal proposed); Yes Female legal, Criminalization pending 2024	No	No Constitutional ban since 1992	No	No	Yes / No Limited protections.	No
Guinea	No Illegal since 6 August 1988; Penalty: 6 months to 10 years imprisonment. (rarely enforced)	No	No	No	No	Yes / No Limited protections.	No
Guinea-Bissau	Yes Legal since 1 March 1993 + UN decl. sign.	No	No	No		Yes / No Limited protection regarding domestic violence.	
Ivory Coast	Yes Legal (No laws against same-sex sexual activity have ever existed in the country); Age of consent discrepancy	No	No	No		Yes / No Limited protections.	
Liberia	No Illegal since 3 April 1978; Penalty: 1 year imprisonment. (repeal proposed)	No	No	No	No	Yes Bans some anti-gay discrimination.	No
Mali	No Illegal since 13 December 2024; Penalty: 7 years imprisonment and a fine of 500,000 francs.	No	No Constitutional ban since 2023	No		No	No
Mauritania	No No Illegal since 9 July 1983; Penalty (de jure): Execution for men, (not enforced, under moratorium), up to 2 years in prison and fines for women (de facto): up to 2 years in prison and a fine.	No	No	No	No	No	No
Niger	No Illegal since 26 March 2025, codified since 11 June 2026; Penalty: 5 to 10 years imprisonment and a fine of up to 100,000,000 francs.	No	No Constitutional ban since 2025	No	No	Yes / No Limited protections.	No
Nigeria	No Illegal since 1 June 1904 (Northern Region only); Illegal since 1 June 1916 (Colony and Protectorate of Nigeria); Penalty: Up to 14 years imprisonment. No Death in the states of Bauchi, Borno, Gombe, Jigawa, Kaduna, Kano, Katsina, Kebbi, Niger, Sokoto, Yobe, and Zamfara. (not enforced)	No	No Statutory ban since 2013	No	No	No / Yes Limited (education)	No Forms of gender expression criminalized in Sharia provinces.
Saint Helena, Ascension and Tristan da Cunha (Overseas Territory of the United Kingdom)	Yes Legal since 1 January 2001 + UN decl. sign.	Yes Legal since 2017	Yes Legal since 2017	Yes Legal since 2017	Yes UK responsible for defence	Yes Bans all anti-gay discrimination	
Senegal	No Illegal since 1 March 1966; Penalty: Up to 10 years imprisonment.	No	No	No	No	No	No
Sierra Leone	No Male illegal since 1 November 1861 (as the Sierra Leone Colony and Protectorate); Penalty: Up to life imprisonment (not enforced, repeal disputed). Yes Female always legal + UN decl. sign.	No	No	No	No	Yes Bans some anti-gay discrimination.	No
Togo	No Illegal since 13 August 1980; Penalty: 1 to 3 years imprisonment and fines. (rarely enforced, repeal proposed)	No	No	No	No	Yes / No Limited protections.	No

==== Central Africa ====
LGBTQ rights in:	Same-sex sexual activity	Recognition of same-sex unions	Same-sex marriage	Adoption by same-sex couples	LGBT people allowed to serve openly in military	Anti-discrimination laws concerning sexual orientation	Laws concerning gender identity/expression
Cameroon	No Illegal since 28 September 1972; Penalty: Up to 5 years imprisonment and fines. (repeal proposed)	No	No	No	No	No	No
Central African Republic	Yes Legal (No laws against same-sex sexual activity have ever existed in the country) + UN decl. sign.	No	No Constitutional ban since 2016	No		Yes / No Limited protections.	No
Chad	No Illegal since 1 August 2017; Penalty: 3 months to 2 years in prison, with fines of 50,000 to 500,000 FCFA. (Penal Code, Chapter 2, Article 354)	No	No	No	No	Yes / No Aggravated punishment when the rape is committed because of the sexual orientation of the victim.	No
Democratic Republic of the Congo	Yes Legal (No laws against same-sex sexual activity have ever existed in the country)	No	No Constitutional ban since 2006	No		Yes / No Limited protections	No
Republic of the Congo	Yes Legal (No laws against same-sex sexual activity have ever existed in the country); Age of consent discrepancy	No	No	No		Yes / No Limited protections.	No
Equatorial Guinea	Yes Legal since 12 October 1968	No	No	No		Yes Bans some anti-gay discrimination.	No
Gabon	Yes Legal since 17 August 1960-4 July 2019, again since 29 June 2020; Age of consent discrepancy, + UN decl. sign.	No	No Constitutional ban since 2024	No		Yes / No Limited protections.	
São Tomé and Príncipe	Yes Legal since 29 November 2012 + UN decl. sign.	No	No	No		Yes Bans some anti-gay discrimination	

==== Eastern Africa ====
LGBTQ rights in:	Same-sex sexual activity	Recognition of same-sex unions	Same-sex marriage	Adoption by same-sex couples	LGBT people allowed to serve openly in military	Anti-discrimination laws concerning sexual orientation	Laws concerning gender identity/expression
Burundi	No Illegal since 22 April 2009; Penalty: 3 months to 2 years imprisonment and fines. (repeal disputed)	No	No Constitutional ban since 2005	No	No	No	No
Djibouti	Yes Legal (No laws against same-sex sexual activity have ever existed in the country)	No	No	No		Yes / No Limited protections.	No
Eritrea	No Illegal since 23 July 1957 (as the British Military Administration of Eritrea); Penalty: Up to 7 years imprisonment. (rarely enforced)	No	No	No	No	No	No
Ethiopia	No Illegal since 5 May 1958 (as the Occupied Enemy Territory Administration in Ethiopia); Penalty: Up to 15 years. (repeal disputed)	No	No Statutory ban since 2009	No	No	No	No
Kenya	No Illegal since 1 August 1897 (as the East Africa Protectorate); Penalty: up to 14 years imprisonment. (repeal proposed)	No	No Constitutional ban since 2010	No	No	Yes / No Limited protections.	Yes
Rwanda	Yes Legal (No laws against same-sex sexual activity have ever existed in the country) + UN decl. sign.	No	No Constitutional ban since 2003	No		Yes / No Limited protections.	No
Somalia	No Illegal since 3 April 1964; Penalty: Up to 3 years prison. Jubaland No Illegal. Penalty: Up to death in Jubaland.	No	No	No	No	No	No
Somaliland (Disputed territory)	No Illegal since 16 March 1941; No Penalty: Up to 3 years prison, sometimes death sentences.	No	No	No	No	No	No
South Sudan	No Illegal since 31 January 1991 (as Anglo-Egyptian Sudan); Penalty: Up to 10 years imprisonment. (not enforced)	No	No Constitutional ban since 2011	No	No	Yes / No Limited protections.	No Forms of gender expression are criminalized.
Tanzania	No Illegal since 1 June 1899 (as part of German East Africa); Illegal since 1 January 1900 (as part of the Sultanate of Zanzibar); Penalty: 30 years to life imprisonment. (repeal disputed)	No	No	No	No	Yes / No Hate crime protections on sexual orientation since 2023.	No
Uganda	No Male illegal since 1 April 1902 (as the Protectorate of Uganda); Female illegal since 8 December 2000; No Penalty: Up to Capital punishment for "aggravated homosexuality"	No	No Constitutional ban since 2005	No	No	No / Yes Limited protections.	No

==== Indian Ocean states ====
LGBTQ rights in:	Same-sex sexual activity	Recognition of same-sex unions	Same-sex marriage	Adoption by same-sex couples	LGBT people allowed to serve openly in military	Anti-discrimination laws concerning sexual orientation	Laws concerning gender identity/expression
Comoros	No Illegal since 31 October 1982; Penalty: 5 years imprisonment and fines. (not enforced)	No	No	No	No	No	No
French Southern and Antarctic Lands (Overseas territory of France)	Yes Legal (No laws against same-sex sexual activity have ever existed in the territory)	Yes Civil solidarity pact since 1999	Yes Legal since 2013	Yes Legal since 2013	Yes France responsible for defence	Yes Bans all anti-gay discrimination	Yes Under French law
Madagascar	Yes Legal (No laws against same-sex sexual activity have ever existed in the country); Age of consent discrepancy	No	No	No		Yes / No Limited protections.	
Mayotte (Overseas region of France)	Yes Legal (No laws against same-sex sexual activity have ever existed in the region)	Yes Civil solidarity pact since 2007	Yes Legal since 2013	Yes Legal since 2013	Yes France responsible for defence	Yes Bans all anti-gay discrimination	Yes Under French law
Mauritius	Yes Legal since 4 October 2023 + UN decl. sign.	No	No	No	Has no military	Yes Bans all anti-gay discrimination	
Réunion (Overseas region of France)	Yes Legal since 6 October 1791	Yes Civil solidarity pact since 1999	Yes Legal since 2013	Yes Legal since 2013	Yes France responsible for defence	Yes Bans all anti-gay discrimination	Yes Under French law
Seychelles	Yes Legal since 1 June 2016 + UN decl. sign.	No	No	No		Yes Bans some anti-gay discrimination	

==== Southern Africa ====
LGBTQ rights in:	Same-sex sexual activity	Recognition of same-sex unions	Same-sex marriage	Adoption by same-sex couples	LGBT people allowed to serve openly in military	Anti-discrimination laws concerning sexual orientation	Laws concerning gender identity/expression
Angola	Yes Legal since 9 February 2021	No	No	No	No	Yes Bans all anti-gay discrimination	May possibly change gender under the Código do Registro Civil 2015
Botswana	Yes Legal since 11 June 2019	No	No	No	Yes	Yes Bans all anti-gay discrimination	Yes Legal gender change recognized as a constitutional right since 2017
Eswatini	No Male illegal since 22 February 1907 (as the Swaziland Protectorate; not enforced, repeal proposed); Penalty: Unknown; Yes Female always legal	No	No	No	No	Yes / No Hate speech ban, only in broadcasting.	Yes Recognized since 1984
Lesotho	Yes Male legal since 1 February 2012; Female always legal	No	No	No		Yes Bans some anti-gay discrimination.	Yes Legal recognition since 1975
Malawi	No Illegal since 1 July 1891 (as British Central Africa Protectorate); Penalty: Up to 14 years imprisonment, with or without corporal punishment for men. Up to 5 years imprisonment for women (rarely enforced, repeal proposed)	No	No	No	No	Yes / No Limited protections.	No
Mozambique	Yes Legal since 29 June 2015	No	No	No	No	Yes Bans some anti-gay discrimination	
Namibia	Yes Legal since 21 June 2024	No / Yes Foreign same-sex marriages recognised	No / Yes Foreign same-sex marriages recognised	No	No	Yes Bans some anti-gay discrimination.	Yes Under the Births, Marriages and Deaths Registration Act 81 of 1963
South Africa	Yes Male legal since 8 May 1998; Female always legal; equal age of consent since 2007 + UN decl. sign.	Yes Limited recognition of unregistered partnerships since 1998; same-sex marriage since 2006	Yes Legal since 2006	Yes Legal since 2002	Yes Since 1998	Yes Constitution bans all anti-gay discrimination	Yes Anti-discrimination laws are interpreted to include gender identity; legal gender may be changed after surgical or medical treatment
Zambia	No Illegal since 17 August 1911 (as part of the British South Africa Company rule of Rhodesia); Penalty: 14 years to life imprisonment. (repeal proposed)	No	No	No	No	Yes / No Limited protections.	No
Zimbabwe	No Male illegal since 1891 (as Rhodesia); Female illegal since 2006 Penalty: Up to 1 year imprisonment with fines (repeal proposed)	No	No Constitutional ban since 2013	No	No	Yes / No Limited protections.	No

=== Americas ===
==== North America ====
LGBTQ rights in:	Same-sex sexual activity	Recognition of same-sex unions	Same-sex marriage	Adoption by same-sex couples	LGBT people allowed to serve openly in military	Anti-discrimination laws concerning sexual orientation	Laws concerning gender identity/expression
Bermuda (Overseas Territory of the United Kingdom)	Yes Legal since 1994; equal age of consent since 2019 + UN decl. sign.	Yes Domestic partnerships since 2018	No Was legal between November 2018 and March 2022 and between May 2017 and June 2018	Yes Legal since 2015	Yes UK responsible for defence	Yes Bans all anti-gay discrimination	No
Canada	Yes Legal since 1969; equal age of consent since 1987 + UN decl. sign.	Yes Domestic partnerships in Nova Scotia (2001); Civil unions in Quebec (2002); Adult interdependent relationships in Alberta (2003); Common-law relationships in Manitoba (2004)	Yes Legal in some provinces and territories since 2003, nationwide since 2005	Yes Legal in some provinces and territories since 1996, nationwide since 2011	Yes Since 1992; Includes transgender people	Yes Bans all anti-gay discrimination. Ban on conversion therapy since 2022 nationwide	Yes / No Transgender people can change their gender and name without completion of medical intervention and human rights protections explicitly include gender identity or expression within all of Canada since 2017.
Greenland (Autonomous Territory within the Kingdom of Denmark)	Yes Legal since 1933; equal age of consent since 1977 + UN decl. sign.	Yes Registered partnerships between 1996 and 2016 (Existing partnerships are still recognised.)	Yes Legal since 2016	Yes Stepchild adoption since 2009; joint adoption since 2016	Yes The Kingdom of Denmark responsible for defence	Yes Bans all anti-gay discrimination	Yes Legal gender change and recognition possible without surgery or hormone therapy
Mexico	Yes Legal since 1871 + UN decl. sign.	Yes / No Civil unions in Mexico City (2007), Coahuila (2007), Colima (between 2013 and 2016), Campeche (2013), Jalisco (between 2014 and 2018), Michoacán (2015), Tlaxcala (2017), Veracruz (2020) and Baja California (2021).	Yes Starting in 2010; nationwide since 2022	Yes / No Legal in Mexico City (2010), Coahuila (2014), Chihuahua (2015), Jalisco (2016), Michoacán (2016), Colima (2016), Morelos (2016), Campeche (2016), Veracruz (2016), Baja California (2017), Querétaro (2017), Chiapas (2017), Puebla (2017), Aguascalientes (2018), San Luis Potosi (2019), Hidalgo (2019), Yucatán (2021), Nayarit (2022), Quintana Roo (2022), Baja California Sur (2022), Zacatecas (2023), Tabasco (2024), Durango, Tamaulipas, and Nuevo León (the latter three never had adoption bans)	(ambiguous)	Yes Bans all anti-gay discrimination Pathologization or attempted treatment of sexual orientation by mental health professionals illegal in Mexico City (2020), México (2020), Baja California Sur (2020), Colima (2021), Tlaxcala (2021), Oaxaca (2021), Yucatán (2021), Zacatecas (2021), Baja California (2022), Hidalgo (2022), Jalisco (2022), Puebla (2022), Sonora (2022), Nuevo León (2022), Querétaro (2023), Sinaloa (2023), Quintana Roo (2023), Morelos (2023), Guerrero (2024), Michoacán (2024), and nationwide (2024).	Yes / No Transgender persons can change their legal gender and name in Mexico City (2008), Michoacán (2017), Nayarit (2017), Coahuila (2018), Hidalgo (2019), San Luis Potosí (2019), Colima (2019), Baja California (2019), Oaxaca (2019), Tlaxcala (2019), Chihuahua (2019), Sonora (2020), Jalisco (2020), Quintana Roo (2020), Puebla (2021), Baja California Sur (2021), México (2021), Morelos (2021), Sinaloa (2022), Zacatecas (2022), Durango (2023), Yucatán (2024), Campeche (2024), and Tabasco (2025).
Saint Pierre and Miquelon (Overseas collectivity of France)	Yes Legal since 1791 + UN decl. sign.	Yes Civil solidarity pact since 1999	Yes Legal since 2013	Yes Legal since 2013	Yes	Yes Bans all anti-gay discrimination	Yes Under French law
United States	Yes Legal in some states since 1962, nationwide since 2003 + UN decl. sign.	Yes Domestic partnerships in California (1999), the District of Columbia (2002), Maine (2004), Washington (2007), Maryland (2008), Oregon (2008), Nevada (2009) and Wisconsin (2009). Civil unions in Vermont (2000), Connecticut (2005), New Jersey (2007), New Hampshire (2008), Illinois (2011), Rhode Island (2011), Delaware (2012), Hawaii (2012) and Colorado (2013).	Yes Legal in some states since 2004, nationwide since 2015	Yes Legal in some states since 1993, nationwide since 2016	Yes / No Lesbians, gays, and bisexuals have been allowed to serve openly in the U.S. military since 2011, following the repeal of the Don't Ask, Don't Tell policy. Transgender people previously allowed to serve openly, but restrictions have been placed on those with a history of gender dysphoria. "Transvestites" are currently banned from the military since 2012. Most openly Intersex people may be banned from the military under the Armed Forces ban of "hermaphrodites".	Yes / No Employment discrimination on the basis of sexual orientation is prohibited nationwide since 2020. More extensive protections exist in 23 states, DC, and some municipalities. Conversion therapy for minors is banned in 22 states, DC, and some municipalities. Sexual orientation is covered by the federal hate crime law since 2009.	Yes / No Gender X became available and recognized formally on US passports in April 2022. This was rescinded in 2025 at the beginning of president Trump's second term;. Gender change is legal on birth certificates (under varying conditions by state), in 42 states + DC. Nonbinary gender markers are available, under varying circumstances, in 25 states + DC. Employment discrimination on the basis of gender identity is prohibited nationwide since 2020. More extensive protections exist in 22 states, DC, and some municipalities.

==== Central America ====
LGBT rights in:	Same-sex sexual activity	Recognition of same-sex unions	Same-sex marriage	Adoption by same-sex couples	LGBT people allowed to serve openly in military	Anti-discrimination laws concerning sexual orientation	Laws concerning gender identity/expression
Belize	Yes Legal since 2016	No	No	No	Yes	Yes Bans all anti-gay discrimination	No
Costa Rica	Yes Legal since 1971 + UN decl. sign.	Yes Unregistered cohabitation since 2014	Yes Legal since 2020	Yes Legal since 2020	Has no military	Yes Bans all anti-gay discrimination	Yes / No Transgender persons can change their legal name without surgeries or judicial permission since 2018. Legal gender cannot be changed. Sex indicator removed from all ID cards issued since May 2018 One-time sex change allowed for passports.
El Salvador	Yes Legal since 1822 + UN decl. sign.	No	No	No	Yes	Yes Bans all anti-gay discrimination	No Bans discrimination based on gender identity.
Guatemala	Yes Legal since 1871 + UN decl. sign.	No Pending	No	No		Yes Bans some anti-gay discrimination	No
Honduras	Yes Legal since 1899 + UN decl. sign.	No Constitutional ban on de facto unions since 2005	No Constitutional ban since 2005; court decision pending	No Constitutional ban since 2005	No	Yes Bans all anti-gay discrimination	No
Nicaragua	Yes Legal since 2008 + UN decl. sign.	No	No	No		Yes Bans some anti-gay discrimination	No
Panama	Yes Legal since 2008 + UN decl. sign.	No Court decision pending	No Court decision pending	No Court decision pending	Has no military	Yes Bans some anti-gay discrimination	Yes Transgender persons can change their legal gender and name after completion of medical intervention since 2006

==== Caribbean ====
LGBT rights in:	Same-sex sexual activity	Recognition of same-sex unions	Same-sex marriage	Adoption by same-sex couples	LGBT people allowed to serve openly in military	Anti-discrimination laws concerning sexual orientation	Laws concerning gender identity/expression
Anguilla (Overseas Territory of the United Kingdom)	Yes Legal since 2001; Age of consent discrepancy + UN decl. sign.	No	No	No	Yes UK responsible for defence	Yes Bans some anti-gay discrimination	
Antigua and Barbuda	Yes Legal since 2022	No	No	No	Yes	Yes Bans all anti-gay discrimination	No
Aruba (Constituent country of the Kingdom of the Netherlands)	Yes Legal (No laws against same-sex sexual activity have ever existed in the country) + UN decl. sign.	Yes Registered partnerships since 2021	Yes	Yes	Yes The Netherlands responsible for defence	Yes Bans all anti-gay discrimination	
(The Bahamas) Bahamas	Yes Legal since 1991; Age of consent discrepancy + UN decl. sign.	No	No	No	Yes	Yes Bans some anti-gay discrimination	No
Barbados	Yes Legal since 2022.	No / Yes Foreign Domestic Partnerships recognized for immigration purposes "Welcome Stamp"	No	No	Yes	Yes Bans some anti-gay discrimination	No
Bonaire (a special municipality of the Netherlands)	Yes Legal (No laws against same-sex sexual activity have ever existed in the municipalities) + UN decl. sign.	Yes Registered partnerships since 2012	Yes Legal since 2012	Yes	Yes The Netherlands responsible for defence	Yes Bans all anti-gay discrimination	Yes
British Virgin Islands (Overseas Territory of the United Kingdom)	Yes Legal since 2001 + UN decl. sign.	No	No	No	Yes UK responsible for defence	Yes Bans all anti-gay discrimination	No
Cayman Islands (Overseas Territory of the United Kingdom)	Yes Legal since 2001; Age of consent discrepancy + UN decl. sign.	Yes Civil partnerships since 2020	No	Yes Legal since 2020	Yes UK responsible for defence	Yes Bans some anti-gay discrimination	No
Cuba	Yes Legal since 1979 + UN decl. sign.	Legal since 2022	Legal since 2022	Legal since 2022	Yes	Yes Bans all anti-gay discrimination	Yes Transgender people allowed to change gender after sex change operations
Curaçao (Constituent country of the Kingdom of the Netherlands)	Yes Legal (No laws against same-sex sexual activity have ever existed in the country) + UN decl. sign.	Yes	Yes	Yes	Yes The Netherlands responsible for defence	Yes Bans all anti-gay discrimination	
Dominica	Yes Legal since 2024 + UN decl. sign.	No	No	No	Has no military	Yes Bans some anti-gay discrimination	No
Dominican Republic	Yes Legal since 1822 + UN decl. sign.	No	No Constitutional ban since 2010	No	Yes Since 2025	Yes Bans some anti-gay discrimination	No
Grenada	No Male illegal since 1987; Penalty: 10-year prison sentence (not enforced). Legalization proposed Yes Female always legal	No	No	No	Has no military	Yes Bans some anti-gay discrimination	No
Guadeloupe (Overseas department of France)	Yes Legal since 1791 + UN decl. sign.	Yes Civil solidarity pact since 1999	Yes Legal since 2013	Yes Legal since 2013	Yes France responsible for defence	Yes Bans all anti-gay discrimination	Yes Under French law
Haiti	Yes Legal since 1791 (as Saint-Domingue)	No	No	No	Has no military	Yes Bans some anti-gay discrimination	No
Jamaica	No Male illegal since 1864; Penalty: 10 years and/or hard labor (Not enforced). Legalization proposed Yes Female always legal.	No	No Constitutional ban since 2011	No	No	Yes Bans some anti-gay discrimination	No
Martinique (Overseas department of France)	Yes Legal since 1791 + UN decl. sign.	Yes Civil solidarity pact since 1999	Yes Legal since 2013	Yes Legal since 2013	Yes France responsible for defence	Yes Bans all anti-gay discrimination	Yes Under French law
Montserrat (Overseas Territory of the United Kingdom)	Yes Legal since 2001 + UN decl. sign.	No	No	No	Yes UK responsible for defence	Yes Bans all anti-gay discrimination	
Puerto Rico (Commonwealth of the United States)	Yes Legal since 2003	Yes Legal since 2015	Yes Legal since 2015	Yes Legal since 2015	Yes United States responsible for defense	Yes Bans some anti-gay discrimination	Yes Gender change legal since 2018; does not require surgery
(Saba (island)) Saba (a special municipality of the Netherlands)	Yes Legal (No laws against same-sex sexual activity have ever existed in the municipalities) + UN decl. sign.	Yes Registered partnerships since 2012	Yes Legal since 2012	Yes	Yes The Netherlands responsible for defence	Yes Bans all anti-gay discrimination	Yes
Saint Barthélemy (Overseas collectivity of France)	Yes Legal since 1791 + UN decl. sign.	Yes Civil solidarity pact since 1999	Yes Legal since 2013	Yes Legal since 2013	Yes France responsible for defence	Yes Bans all anti-gay discrimination	Yes Under French law
Saint Kitts and Nevis	Yes Legal since 2022	No	No	No	Yes	Yes Bans some anti-gay discrimination	
Saint Lucia	Yes Legal since 2025	No	No	No	Has no military	Yes Bans some anti-gay discrimination	No
Saint Martin (Overseas collectivity of France)	Yes Legal since 1791 + UN decl. sign.	Yes Civil solidarity pact since 1999	Yes Legal since 2013	Yes Legal since 2013	Yes France responsible for defence	Yes Bans all anti-gay discrimination	Yes Under French law
Saint Vincent and the Grenadines	No Illegal since 1989; Penalty: Fine and/or 10-year prison sentence (Not enforced). Legalization proposed	No	No	No	Has no military	Yes Bans some anti-gay discrimination	
Sint Eustatius (a special municipality of the Netherlands)	Yes Legal (No laws against same-sex sexual activity have ever existed in the municipalities) + UN decl. sign.	Yes Registered partnerships since 2012	Yes Legal since 2012	Yes	Yes The Netherlands responsible for defence	Yes Bans all anti-gay discrimination	Yes
Sint Maarten (Constituent country of the Kingdom of the Netherlands)	Yes Legal (No laws against same-sex sexual activity have ever existed in the country) + UN decl. sign.	No	No / Yes Same-sex marriages performed in the Netherlands recognized	No	Yes The Netherlands responsible for defence	Yes Bans all anti-gay discrimination	
Trinidad and Tobago	No Male illegal since 2025; Penalty: Up to 5-year prison sentence (not enforced, Court of Appeal ruling that reinstated buggery and gross indecency laws; previously struck down by lower court in 2018; appeal to Privy Council pending.); Yes Female always legal	No	No	No	No	Yes Bans some anti-gay discrimination	No
Turks and Caicos Islands (Overseas Territory of the United Kingdom)	Yes Legal since 2001; Age of consent discrepancy + UN decl. sign.	No	No	No	Yes UK responsible for defence	Yes Bans all anti-gay discrimination	Yes / No Gender identity change is not recognized for the purpose of inheritance of hereditary peerages and baronetcies, which is subject to Section 16 of the United Kingdom's Gender Recognition Act 2004.
United States Virgin Islands (Territory of the United States)	Yes Legal since 1985	Yes Legal since 2015	Yes Legal since 2015	Yes Legal since 2015	Yes United States responsible for defense	Yes Bans all anti-gay discrimination	Yes Legislation enacted in 2022, also explicitly includes gender identity.

==== South America ====
LGBT rights in:	Same-sex sexual activity	Recognition of same-sex unions	Same-sex marriage	Adoption by same-sex couples	LGBT people allowed to serve openly in military	Anti-discrimination laws concerning sexual orientation	Laws concerning gender identity/expression
Argentina	Yes Legal since 1887 + UN decl. sign.	Yes Civil unions in Buenos Aires (2003), Río Negro Province (2003), Villa Carlos Paz (2007) and Río Cuarto (2009); Cohabitation unions nationwide since 2015	Yes Legal since 2010	Yes Legal since 2010	Yes Since 2009	Yes / No Legal protection in some cities; pending nationwide. Pathologization or attempted treatment of sexual orientation by mental health professionals illegal since 2010	Yes Transgender persons can change their legal gender and name without surgeries or judicial order since 2012 Transgender persons have a law reserving 1% of Argentina's public sector jobs. Economic incentives included in the new law aim to help trans people find work in all sectors.
Bolivia	Yes Legal since 1832 + UN decl. sign.	Yes Free unions officially recognised starting in 2020; nationwide since 2023.	No Constitutional ban since 2009	Yes Same-sex couples in a free union are permitted to adopt	Yes Since 2015; Includes transgender people	Yes Bans all anti-gay discrimination	Yes Transgender persons can change their legal gender and name without surgeries or judicial order since 2016
Brazil	Yes Legal since 1830 + UN decl. sign.	Yes "Stable unions" legal and all rights as recognized family entities available nationwide since 2011	Yes Starting in 2011; nationwide since 2013	Yes Legal since 2010	Yes Since 1969	Yes Bans all anti-gay discrimination. Pathologization or attempted treatment of sexual orientation by mental health professionals illegal since 1999	Yes Transgender people can change their legal gender and name before a notary without the need of surgeries or judicial order since 2018. The sex reassignment surgery, hormonal and psychological treatment are offered free of charge by the Brazilian Unified Health System (UHS)
Chile	Yes Legal since 1999; equal age of consent since 2022 + UN decl. sign.	Yes Civil unions since 2015	Yes Legal since 2022	Yes Legal since 2022	Yes Since 2012; Includes transgender people	Yes Bans all anti-gay discrimination Pathologization or attempted treatment of sexual orientation by mental health professionals illegal since 2021	Yes Transsexual persons can change their registral sex and name since 1974. Transgender persons can change their registral sex and name, no surgeries or judicial order for adults above 18 years old since 2019.
Colombia	Yes Legal since 1981 + UN decl. sign.	Yes De facto marital union since 2007	Yes Legal since 2016	Yes Stepchild adoption since 2014; joint adoption since 2015	Yes Since 1999	Yes Bans all anti-gay discrimination	Yes Since 2015, transgender persons can change their legal gender and name manifesting their solemn will before a notary, no surgeries or judicial order required
Ecuador	Yes Legal since 1997 + UN decl. sign.	Yes De facto unions since 2009	Yes Legal since 2019	No LGBT individuals may adopt, but not same-sex couples		Yes Bans all anti-gay discrimination. Pathologization or attempted treatment of sexual orientation by mental health professionals illegal since 2014	Yes Since 2016, transgender persons are allowed to change their birth name and gender identity; no surgeries or judicial order required
Falkland Islands (Overseas Territory of the United Kingdom)	Yes Legal since 1989; equal age of consent since 2006 + UN decl. sign.	Yes Civil partnerships since 2017	Yes Legal since 2017	Yes Legal since 2017	Yes UK responsible for defence	Yes Bans all anti-gay discrimination	No
French Guiana (Overseas department of France)	Yes Legal since 1791 + UN decl. sign.	Yes Civil solidarity pact since 1999	Yes Legal since 2013	Yes Legal since 2013	Yes France responsible for defence	Yes Bans all anti-gay discrimination	Yes Under French law
Guyana	No Male illegal since 1893; Penalty: Up to life imprisonment (Not enforced). Legalization proposed Yes Female always legal	No	No		Yes	Yes Bans some anti-gay discrimination	No
Paraguay	Yes Legal since 1880; Age of consent discrepancy + UN decl. sign.	No Constitutional ban on de facto unions since 1992	No Constitutional ban since 1992	No	Yes	Yes Bans some anti-gay discrimination. Pathologization or attempted treatment of sexual orientation by mental health professionals illegal since 2022	No
Peru	Yes Legal since 1924; equal age of consent since 2012 + UN decl. sign.	No / Yes Limited recognition for same-sex partners of health-care workers since 2020.	No	No	Yes Since 2009	Yes Bans all anti-gay discrimination	Yes Transgender persons can change their legal gender and name without the need for the completion of medical intervention since 2016. Judicial order required.
South Georgia and the South Sandwich Islands (Overseas Territory of the United Kingdom)	Yes Legal since 2001 + UN decl. sign.	Yes Legal since 2014	Yes Legal since 2014		Yes UK responsible for defence	Yes Bans some anti-gay discrimination	No
Suriname	Yes Legal since 1869 (as Dutch Guiana)	No	Yes Since 13 February 2025, Court recognizes 2 same-sex marriages performed abroad	No		Yes Bans all anti-gay discrimination	Yes Transgender persons can change their legal gender since 2022. Court order required.
Uruguay	Yes Legal since 1934 + UN decl. sign.	Yes Concubinage union since 2008	Yes Legal since 2013	Yes Legal since 2009	Yes Since 2009	Yes Bans all anti-gay discrimination. Pathologization or attempted treatment of sexual orientation by mental health professionals illegal since 2017	Yes Transgender persons can change their legal gender and name without surgeries or judicial order required since 2009. Self-determination since 2018.
Venezuela	Yes Legal since 1997 + UN decl. sign.	No Constitutional ban on de facto stable unions since 1999	No Constitutional ban since 1999	No	Yes Since 2023	Yes Bans some anti-gay discrimination	No

=== Antarctica ===
Lesbian, gay, bisexual, transgender and queer (LGBTQ) people in Antarctica may experience different rights depending on their nationality.

As Antarctica has no resident human population, the human presence there is limited to short-term research or sporting expeditions. The Antarctic Treaty System provides that all legal rights in Antarctica are governed by those of the person's home nation, and do not change based on which country's Antarctic territorial claim the person happens to be present in at any given time.

=== Asia ===
==== North Asia ====
LGBT rights in:	Same-sex sexual activity	Recognition of same-sex unions	Same-sex marriage	Adoption by same-sex couples	LGBT people allowed to serve openly in military?	Anti-discrimination laws concerning sexual orientation	Laws concerning gender identity/expression
Russia (Including occupied territories such as Crimea)	Yes Fully legal nationwide since 1993 (de-facto illegal and punishment up to death in Chechnya)	No	No Constitution limits marriage to opposite-sex couples since 2020	No	Yes	No	No Gender change has not been legal since 2023

==== Central Asia ====
LGBT rights in:	Same-sex sexual activity	Recognition of same-sex unions	Same-sex marriage	Adoption by same-sex couples	LGBT people allowed to serve openly in military?	Anti-discrimination laws concerning sexual orientation	Laws concerning gender identity/expression
Kazakhstan	Yes Legal since 1998	No	No	No	Yes Since 2022	No	Yes
Kyrgyzstan	Yes Legal since 1998	No	No Constitutional ban since 2016	No	Ambiguous	No	Yes Requires sex reassignment surgery
Tajikistan	Yes Legal since 1998	No	No	No	Ambiguous	No	Yes Requires sex reassignment surgery
Turkmenistan	No Male illegal since 1927; Penalty: up to 2 years imprisonment. Yes Female always legal	No	No	No	No	No	No
Uzbekistan	No Male illegal since 1926; Penalty: up to 3 years imprisonment. Yes Female always legal	No	No Constitutional ban since 2023.	No	No	No	No

==== West Asia ====
LGBT rights in:	Same-sex sexual activity	Recognition of same-sex unions	Same-sex marriage	Adoption by same-sex couples	LGBT people allowed to serve openly in military?	Anti-discrimination laws concerning sexual orientation	Laws concerning gender identity/expression
Abkhazia (Disputed territory)	Yes Legal	No	No	No	Ambiguous	No	Ambiguous
Akrotiri and Dhekelia (Overseas Territory of the United Kingdom)	Yes Legal since 2000 + UN decl. sign.	Yes Civil partnerships since 2005	Yes Legal since 2014	Ambiguous	Yes UK responsible for defence	Yes Bans some anti-gay discrimination	Ambiguous
Armenia	Yes Legal since 2003 + UN decl. sign.	No	No Constitutional ban since 2015	No LGBT individuals may adopt, but not same-sex couples.	No	No	No
Azerbaijan	Yes Legal since 2000	No	No	No	No	No	No
Bahrain	Yes Legal since 1976	No	No	No	No	No	Yes Transgender people allowed to change legal gender, but only after sex reassignment surgery.
Cyprus	Yes Legal since 1998 + UN decl. sign.	Yes Civil cohabitation since 2015	No	No	Yes	Yes Bans some anti-gay discrimination	Yes Forbids some discrimination based on gender identity. No Gender change is not legal.
(Georgia (country)) Georgia	Yes Legal since 2000 + UN decl. sign.	No	No Constitutional ban since 2018	No	Ambiguous	Yes Bans all anti-gay discrimination	No
Iran	No No Illegal; Penalty: 74 lashes for immature men and death penalty for mature men (although there are documented cases of minors executed because of their sexual orientation). For women, 100 lashes for women of mature sound mind and if consenting. Death penalty offense after fourth conviction.	No	No	No	No	No	Yes Sex reassignment surgery has been permitted since 1987.
Iraq	No Re-criminalized in 2024. Penalty: Prison sentence between 10 and 15 years.	No	No	No	No	No	No
Israel	Yes Legal since 1963 (de facto), 1988 (de jure) + UN decl. sign.	Yes Unregistered cohabitation since 1994.	No No/ Yes Foreign same-sex marriages are recognized and recorded in the population registry	Yes Permitted by law since 2008. But in practice gay couples were put at the end of the queue for adoption, until the Supreme Court forbade this discrimination in 2023. Legal adoptions by gay couples began in practice in 2025.	Yes Since 1993; Includes transgender people	Yes Bans all anti-gay discrimination	Yes Full recognition of gender's ID with or without a surgery or medical intervention; equal employment opportunity law bars discrimination based on gender identity
Jordan	Yes Legal	No	No	No	Ambiguous	No	Yes Allowed since 2014
Kuwait	No Male illegal; Penalty: Fines or up to 6-year prison sentence.; Yes Female always legal	No	No	No	No	No	No
Lebanon	Ambiguous Ambiguous. Illegal under Article 534 of the Penal Code. Some judges have ruled not to prosecute individuals based on the law, however, this has not been settled by the Supreme Court and thus homosexuality is still illegal. However, a 2017 court ruling claims that it is legal, but the law against it is still in place. Penalty: Up to 1 year imprisonment (unenforced).	No	No	No	No	No	Yes Legal gender change allowed, but sex reassignment surgery required
Northern Cyprus (Disputed territory)	Yes Legal since 2014	No	No	No	No	Yes Bans all anti-gay discrimination	Yes Legal, requires surgery for change
Oman	No Illegal; Penalty: Fines and prison sentence up to 3 years (only enforced when dealing with "public scandal").	No	No	No	No	No	No Laws against forms of gender expression.
Palestine	West Bank: Yes Legal Gaza: No consensus on legal applicability of British 1936 Sexual offences provisions to homosexual conduct	West Bank: No; Gaza: No	No	No (can only be done by a single individual, not couples)	(Palestine does not have a military)	Yes (but in employment only in some contexts) but in regard to provision of goods and services or in all other areas (incl. indirect discrimination, hate speech)	No right to change legal gender but and gender-affirming care was restricted previously to intersex people, not available due to destruction from Gaza war
Qatar	No No Illegal; Penalty: Fines, up to 7 years imprisonment Death penalty for Muslims.	No	No	No	No	No	No
Saudi Arabia	No No Illegal; Penalty: Capital punishment, prison terms (indeterminate length, max. term unknown), flogging, fines, deportation	No	No	No	No	No	No Laws against forms of gender expression.
South Ossetia (Disputed territory)	Yes Legal	No	No	No	Ambiguous	No	Ambiguous
Syria	No Illegal since 1949; Penalty: Up to 3 years imprisonment.	No	No	No	No	No	No
Turkey	Yes Legal since 1858	No	No	No LGBT individuals may adopt, but not same-sex couples.	No	No	Yes Requires sterilisation and sex reassignment surgery for change
United Arab Emirates	No Illegal; Penalty: Maximum: Capital punishment Minimum: Lashings, imprisonment and fines	No	No	No	No	No	No Sex reassignment surgery severely restricted to limited circumstances (mainly physical intersex traits), highly regulated by the state. Laws used against forms of gender expression.
Yemen	No No Illegal (codified in 1994); Penalty: Unmarried men punished with 100 lashes of the whip or a maximum of one year of imprisonment, stoning for adultery is not enforced. Women punished up to three years of imprisonment.	No	No	No	No	No	No

==== South Asia ====
LGBT rights in:	Same-sex sexual activity	Recognition of same-sex unions	Same-sex marriage	Adoption by same-sex couples	LGBT people allowed to serve openly in military?	Anti-discrimination laws concerning sexual orientation	Laws concerning gender identity/expression
Afghanistan	No No Illegal; Penalty: Death penalty	No	No	No	No	No	No
Bangladesh	No Illegal since 1862; Penalty: 10 years to life imprisonment (Occasionally enforced).	No	No	No	No	No	Yes A third gender option (hijra) besides male and female is available for a certain sect of third genders
Bhutan	Yes Legal until 2004, again since 2021	No	No	No	No	Yes Bans some anti-gay discrimination	Yes Transgender people allowed to change legal gender without surgery
British Indian Ocean Territory (Overseas Territory of the United Kingdom)	Yes Legal since 2001 + UN decl. sign.	Yes Civil partnerships since 2005	Yes Legal since 2014	Ambiguous	Yes UK responsible for defense	Ambiguous	Ambiguous
India	Yes Legal since 2009–2013, again since 2018	No	No	No	No	Yes Bans some anti-gay discrimination	Yes A third gender option (hijra) besides male and female is available; transgender people have a constitutional right to change gender, only after medical/surgical intervention
Maldives	No Illegal (codified in 2014); Penalty: Up to 8 years imprisonment, house arrest, lashings and fines. (unenforced) LGBTQ welcomed in tourist islands.	No	No	No	No	No	No
Nepal	Yes Legal since 2007 + UN decl. sign.	Yes Since 2026	Yes Since 2026	No	Yes Since 2007	Yes Constitutional protections since 2015	No Change to third gender "O" legal since 2007, unable to change to male or female
Pakistan	No Illegal since 1862; Penalty: 2 years to life sentence (Occasionally enforced).	No	No	No	No	Yes Transphobia illegal No Homophobia/biphobia is not illegal	Yes Right to change gender; transgender and intersex citizens have legal protections from all discrimination and harassment
Sri Lanka	No Illegal since 1885; Penalty: Up to 10 years imprisonment with fines. (Ruled unenforceable by the Supreme Court) Legalization proposed	No	No	No	No	Yes Bans some anti-gay discrimination	Yes Transgender people allowed to change legal gender without surgery

==== East Asia ====
LGBT rights in:	Same-sex sexual activity	Recognition of relationships	Same-sex marriage	Adoption by same-sex couples	LGBT people allowed to serve openly in military?	Anti-discrimination laws concerning sexual orientation	Laws concerning gender identity/expression
China	Yes Legal since 1997	No	No	No	Yes can openly serve No open displays of affection	Yes Court has in some cases protected LGBT workers from employment discrimination. No protection codified in law	Yes legal gender change possible since 2002. Since 2022, legal gender change allowed with only partial sex reassignment surgery. Difficulty remains to change gender information on diplomas and degrees.
Hong Kong	Yes Legal since 1991	No No/ Yes Same-sex marriages registered overseas for government benefits and taxation, and limited recognition of local cohabiting partners	No	Yes Yes/ No Stepchild adoption since 2021	The central government of China is responsible for the defense of Hong Kong.	Yes Bans some anti-gay discrimination (government discrimination only)	Yes Following a legal decision, may change gender marker after partial sex reassignment surgery.
Japan	Yes Legal since 1882 + UN decl. sign.	No * Symbolic recognition in some jurisdictions.	No Proposed in 2023. Adult adoption is practiced as an alternative.	No	Yes The Japan Self-Defense Forces allows gay people to enlist.	No nationwide protections Yes some cities ban some anti-gay discrimination	Yes Transgender people allowed to change legal gender, but only after sex reassignment surgery
Macau	Yes Legal since 1996	No	No	No	The central government of China is responsible for the defence of Macau.	Yes Bans some anti-gay discrimination	Ambiguous
Mongolia	Yes Legal since 1993 + UN decl. sign.	No	No Constitutional ban since 1992	No	Yes (Only LGB)	Yes Bans all anti-gay discrimination	Yes Transgender people allowed to change legal gender but only after sex reassignment surgery
North Korea	Yes Legal	No	No	No	Yes can serve with 10-year celibacy required for all soldiers. No open displays of LGBT attitudes.	No	No
South Korea	Yes Legal + UN decl. sign.	No	No Proposed in 2023	No	No	No nationwide protections Yes Protection from discrimination varies by jurisdiction in some areas, including Seoul	Yes Transgender people allowed to change legal gender but usually requires sex reassignment surgery
Taiwan	Yes Legal		Legal since 2019	Yes Stepchild adoption since 2019; Yes Joint adoption legal since 2023	Yes	Yes Constitutionally bans all anti-gay discrimination from government; several laws banning anti-gay discrimination regarding education and employment.	Yes Transgender people allowed to change legal gender, but only after sex reassignment surgery. (Note: In Taiwan, gender change is not explicitly stated in any law; instead it is permitted by an executive order published by the Ministry of the Interior, which dictates that sex reassignment surgeries are required before gender change. In 2021 a judgement by the Taipei High Administrative Court ruled that the executive order above was unconstitutional and therefore the defendant (district household registration office) must allow the plaintiff to change their gender. The judgement was finalized since the defendant did not appeal. However, since rulings in Taiwan are generally not precedential, said judgement only applies to the plaintiff and does not bind other cases nor the executive branch.)

==== Southeast Asia ====
LGBT rights in	Same-sex sexual activity	Recognition of relationships	Same-sex marriage	Adoption by same-sex couples	LGBT people allowed to serve openly in military?	Anti-discrimination laws concerning sexual orientation	Laws concerning gender identity/expression
Brunei	No No Illegal since 1908; Penalty: Death by stoning (in abeyance, de jure), 7 year imprisonment and 100 lashes for men (de facto). Caning and 10 years prison for women.	No	No	No	No	No	Laws prohibit forms of gender expression.
Cambodia	Yes Legal	No No/ Yes Partnerships recognized in certain cities	No Constitutional ban since 1993	No	Ambiguous	No	No
Indonesia	Ambiguous Not criminalized in private relationship. Illegal under morality laws and Aceh; Penalty: Up to 1.5 years imprisonment	No	No	No LGBT individuals may adopt, but not same-sex couples	No Not explicitly prohibited by Law (de jure), Illegal (de facto)	Ambiguous Circular letter bans hate speech based on sexual orientation but enforcement inconsistent and discrimination still active.	Yes Transgender people allowed to change legal gender, but only after sex reassignment surgery.
Laos	Yes Legal	No	No	No	Ambiguous	No No/ Yes Limited Bans some anti-gay discrimination	Ambiguous
Malaysia	No; Federal criminal law: Illegal since 1871, up to 20 years imprisonment and caning for anal sex (male/male or male/female); Uncertain for lesbian sex. (Note: There are no provision that specifically criminalise lesbian sex under Malaysia's federal criminal law, and there is no known case of lesbian being charged for lesbian sex under Section 377D of the Penal Code. See LGBTQ rights in Malaysia § Federal criminal law for details.) No; State shariah law: Gay sex or lesbian sex, or both, are illegal for Muslims in all states and federal territories, except in Pahang. (Note: See LGBTQ rights in Malaysia § State Shariah law for details. Some state shariah law criminalising same-sex intercourse have also been nullified by the Federal Court of Malaysia due to conflicts with federal law and the Malaysian Constitution.)	No	No	No LGBT individuals may adopt, but not same-sex couples	No	No	No Generally impossible to change gender. Gender changes was briefly recognized as fundamental rights in a 2014 court ruling, but was overturned by the apex court in 2015. Forms of gender expression are criminalized for Muslims under state shariah law.
Myanmar	No Illegal since 1886; Penalty: Up to 10 years in prison (unenforced).	No	No	No	No	No No/ Yes Limited Bans some anti-gay discrimination	No
Philippines	Yes Legal + UN decl. sign. (Note: Except for the settlements Marawi and M'lang.)	No (Pending)	No (Pending)	No LGBT individuals may adopt, but not same-sex couples	Yes Since 2009	Yes Yes/ No Bans some anti-gay discrimination in certain cities and provinces, including the City of Manila,Cebu City, Quezon City, and Davao City; Nationwide anti-bullying law for basic education students.	No Generally impossible to change legal gender. However in Cagandahan vs Philippines, allowed an intersex man to change his legal gender from female to male.
Singapore	Yes Legal since 2007 (de facto), 2022 (de jure)	No	No	Ambiguous, a gay Singaporean man with a male partner in 2018 won an appeal in court to adopt a child that he fathered through a surrogate.	Yes	Yes Protections against anti-gay discrimination, harassment and violence	Yes Transgender people allowed to change legal gender, but only after sex reassignment surgery
Thailand	Yes Legal since 1956 + UN decl. sign.	Yes Since 2025	Yes Since 2025	Yes Since 2025	Yes Since 2005	Yes Bans all anti-gay discrimination	No Yes Anti-discrimination protections for gender expression.
Timor-Leste	Yes Legal since 1975 + UN decl. sign.	No	No	Yes LGBT individuals may adopt but same-sex couples can not adopt	Ambiguous	Yes Bans some anti gay discrimination, Hate crime protections since 2009.	Ambiguous
Vietnam	Yes Legal + UN decl. sign.	No	No	No LGBT individuals may adopt, not same-sex couples	Yes Irrespective of one's sexual orientation	Yes Bans some anti-gay discrimination	Yes Gender changes recognized and officially practised since 2017

=== Europe ===
==== European Union ====
LGBT rights in	Same-sex sexual activity	Recognition of same-sex unions	Same-sex marriage	Adoption by same-sex couples	LGBT people allowed to serve openly in military	Anti-discrimination laws concerning sexual orientation	Laws concerning gender identity/expression
member states of the European Union	Yes Legal in all 27 member states	Yes / No Recognized in 25/27 member states	Yes / No Legal in 16/27 member states	Yes / No Stepchild adoption legal in 19/27 member states; joint adoption legal in 17/27 member states	Yes Legal in all member states	Yes Membership requires a state to ban discrimination based on person's sexual orientation in employment. 4/27 states ban some anti-gay discrimination. 23/27 states ban all anti-gay discrimination	Yes / No Legal in 24/27 member states

==== Central Europe ====
LGBT rights in	Same-sex sexual activity	Recognition of same-sex unions	Same-sex marriage	Adoption by same-sex couples	LGBT people allowed to serve openly in military	Anti-discrimination laws concerning sexual orientation	Laws concerning gender identity/expression
Austria	Yes Legal since 1971; equal age of consent since 2002 + UN decl. sign.	Yes Registered partnerships since 2010	Yes Legal since 2019	Yes Stepchild adoption since 2013; joint adoption since 2016	Yes Includes transgender people	Yes Bans all anti-gay discrimination	Yes Transgender people allowed to change gender without undergoing surgery
Czech Republic	Yes Legal since 1962 (As part of Czechoslovakia); equal age of consent since 1990 + UN decl. sign.	Yes Registered partnerships since 2006	No	Yes / No Stepchild adoption since 2025	Yes Includes transgender people	Yes Bans all anti-gay discrimination	Yes Transgender people allowed to change gender without undergoing surgery
Germany	Yes Legal in East Germany since 1968; Legal in West Germany since 1969; equal age of consent since 1988 in East Germany and since 1994 in unified Germany + UN decl. sign.	Yes Registered life partnerships from 2001 to 2017 (existing partnerships and new foreign partnerships still recognised)	Yes Legal since 2017	Yes Stepchild adoption since 2005; successive adoption since 2013; joint adoption legal since 2017	Yes Includes transgender people	Yes Bans all anti-gay discrimination	Yes Gender self-determination enacted and implemented on a birth certificate since 2024.
Hungary	Yes Legal since 1962; equal age of consent since 2002 + UN decl. sign.	Yes Registered partnerships since 2009	No Constitutional ban since 2012	No Constitutional ban since 2020	Yes	Yes Bans all anti-gay discrimination	Yes Forbids discrimination based on gender identity No Transgender people are not allowed to change gender since 2020.
Liechtenstein	Yes Legal since 1989; equal age of consent since 2001 + UN decl. sign.	Yes Registered partnerships since 2011	Yes Legal since 2025	Yes Stepchild adoption since 2022; joint adoption since 2023	Has no military	Yes Bans all anti-gay discrimination	No Gender change is not legal
Poland	Yes Always legal in Polish legislation (Russian Empire, Kingdom of Prussia and Austria-Hungary Empire laws criminalizing same-sex intercourse were in force to 1932; German laws criminalizing same-sex intercourse were in force from 1939 to 1945 during Nazi Germany occupation) + UN decl. sign.	No	No / Yes Constitutional ban since 1997 (Article 18 of the Constitution is generally interpreted as limiting marriage to opposite-sex couples) (Note: In January 2019, a lower administrative court in Warsaw ruled that the language in Article 18 of the Constitution does not explicitly ban same-sex marriage.) Marriages performed in other EU countries recognised under EU Law	No LGBT individuals may adopt, but not same-sex couples	Yes	Yes Bans some anti-gay discrimination	Yes Transgender people allowed to change gender. No provisions for nonbinary people.
Slovakia	Yes Legal since 1962 (As part of Czechoslovakia); equal age of consent since 1990 + UN decl. sign.	No	No Constitutional ban since 2014	No By law adoption for LGBT individuals and couples is prohibited since 2025	Yes	Yes Bans all anti-gay discrimination	No By law legal gender change not recognised since 2025 by a constitutional amendment, de facto since 2022.
Slovenia	Yes Legal since 1977 (As part of Yugoslavia); equal age of consent since 1990 + UN decl. sign.	Yes Registered cohabitation since 2006; Registered partnerships since 2017	Yes Legal since 2022	Yes Stepchild adoption since 2011; joint adoption since 2022	Yes	Yes Bans all anti-gay discrimination	Yes Gender change is legal
Switzerland	Yes Legal nationwide since 1942; Legal in the cantons of Geneva (as part of France), Ticino, Valais, and Vaud since 1798; equal age of consent since 1990 + UN decl. sign.	Yes Registered partnerships in Geneva (2001), Zürich (2003), Neuchâtel (2004) and Fribourg (2005); Nationwide from 2007 until 2022 (superseded by marriage)	Yes Legal since 2022	Yes Stepchild adoption since 2018; joint adoption since 2022	Yes Includes transgender people	Yes Bans all anti-gay discrimination	Yes Change of legal sex by simple declaration (self-determination +16 yo); surgery/sterilisation not required.

==== Eastern Europe ====
LGBT rights in	Same-sex sexual activity	Recognition of same-sex unions	Same-sex marriage	Adoption by same-sex couples	LGBT people allowed to serve openly in military	Anti-discrimination laws concerning sexual orientation	Laws concerning gender identity/expression
Abkhazia (Disputed territory)	Yes Legal after 1991	No	No	No		No	
Armenia	Yes Legal since 2003 + UN decl. sign.	No	No Constitutional ban since 2015	No	No	No	No
Azerbaijan	Yes Legal since 2000	No	No	No	No	No	No
Belarus	Yes Legal since 1994	No	No Constitutional ban since 1994	No	No / Yes Banned from military service during peacetime, but during wartime homosexuals are permitted to enlist as partially able	No	Yes / No (Highly bureaucratic, lengthy two-stage process: deciding body meets only twice a year; permission for medical or surgical interventions only at the second stage. Flaw in passport conversion whereby passport number may reveal former designation of sex to agencies.)
(Georgia (country)) Georgia	Yes Legal since 2000 + UN decl. sign.	No	No Constitutional ban since 2018	No		Yes Bans all anti-gay discrimination	No
Kazakhstan	Yes Legal since 1998	No	No	No	Yes	No	Yes Requires sex reassignment surgery, sterilization, hormone therapy and medical examinations
Moldova	Yes Legal since 1995 + UN decl. sign.	No	No Constitutional ban since 1994	No	Yes	Yes Bans all anti-gay discrimination	Yes Forbids discrimination based on gender identity. Yes / No (Sterilization is technically not required by law but the absence of a concrete legal framework regarding gender identity forces all individuals seeking legal gender change to go through a lengthy and highly bureaucratic process to seek recognition through the court system on an individual basis with mixed results often depending on each individual judge.)
Russia	Yes Male legal nationwide since 1993; Female always legal (de-facto illegal in Chechnya)	No	No Constitution limits marriage to opposite-sex couples since 2020	No	Yes	No	No Gender change has not been legal since 2023
South Ossetia (Disputed territory)	Yes Legal after 1991	No	No	No		No	
Transnistria (Disputed territory)	Yes Legal since 2002	No	No	No		No	
Ukraine	Yes Legal since 1991 + UN decl. sign.	Yes / No Establishment of the fact of cohabitation as a family (de facto marital relationship) by court order since 2026	No Constitutional ban since 1996	No LGBT individuals may adopt, but not same-sex couples	Yes	Yes Bans some anti-gay discrimination	Yes No longer requires sterilisation or surgery for change since 2016

==== Northern Europe ====
LGBT rights in	Same-sex sexual activity	Recognition of same-sex unions	Same-sex marriage	Adoption by same-sex couples	LGBT people allowed to serve openly in military	Anti-discrimination laws concerning sexual orientation	Laws concerning gender identity/expression
Denmark	Yes Legal since 1933; equal age of consent since 1973 + UN decl. sign.	Yes Registered partnerships from 1989 to 2012 (existing partnerships are still recognised)	Yes Legal since 2012	Yes Stepchild adoption since 1999; joint adoption since 2010	Yes Includes transgender people	Yes Bans all anti-gay discrimination	Yes Legal gender change and recognition possible without surgery or hormone therapy
Estonia	Yes Legal since 1992, legal 1935-1940, never criminalised between women; equal age of consent since 2002 + UN decl. sign.	Yes Cohabitation agreement since 2016	Yes Legal since 2024	Yes Stepchild adoption since 2016; joint adoption since 2024	Yes Includes transgender people	Yes Bans all anti-gay discrimination	Yes Gender reassignment legal; surgery not required
Faroe Islands (Autonomous Territory within the Kingdom of Denmark)	Yes Legal since 1933; equal age of consent since 1977 + UN decl. sign.	Yes	Yes Legal since 2017	Yes Legal since 2017	Yes The Kingdom of Denmark responsible for defence	Yes Bans some anti-gay discrimination	No
Finland (includes Åland)	Yes Legal since 1971; equal age of consent since 1999 + UN decl. sign.	Yes Registered partnerships from 2002 to 2017 (existing partnerships are still recognised)	Yes Legal since 2017	Yes Stepchild adoption since 2009; joint adoption since 2017	Yes Includes transgender people	Yes Bans all anti-gay discrimination	Yes Since 2023, by way of self-determination.
Iceland	Yes Legal since 1940; equal age of consent since 1992 (As part of Denmark) + UN decl. sign.	Yes Registered cohabitation since 2006; Registered partnerships from 1996 to 2010 (existing partnerships are still recognised)	Yes Legal since 2010	Yes Legal since 2006	No standing army	Yes Bans all anti-gay discrimination	Yes Documents can be amended to the recognised gender, sterilisation not required
Latvia	Yes Legal since 1992 + UN decl. sign.	Yes Registered partnerships since 2024	No Constitutional ban since 2006	No LGBT individuals may adopt, but not same-sex couples, incl. stepchild adoption	Yes	Yes Bans some anti-gay discrimination	Yes Legal change allowed but requires "full" transition and doctor's or court's approval. Sterilization required.
Lithuania	Yes Legal since 1993 + UN decl. sign.	Yes Registered partnerships admitted by the judiciary since 2025	No Constitutional ban since 1992	Yes / No Stepchild adoption admitted by the judiciary since 2024	Yes	Yes Bans all anti-gay discrimination	Yes Since 2022, gender change on legal documents permitted without surgery and no non-binary option available.
Norway (includes Svalbard and Jan Mayen)	Yes Legal since 1972 + UN decl. sign.	Yes Registered partnerships from 1993 to 2009 (existing partnerships are still recognised)	Yes Legal since 2009	Yes Stepchild adoption since 2002; joint adoption since 2009	Yes Includes transgender people	Yes Bans all anti-gay discrimination	Yes All documents can be amended to the recognised gender
Sweden	Yes Legal since 1944; equal age of consent since 1972 + UN decl. sign.	Yes Registered partnerships from 1995 to 2009 (existing partnerships are still recognised)	Yes Legal since 2009	Yes Legal since 2003	Yes Includes transgender people	Yes Bans all anti-gay discrimination	Yes First country within the world in 1972, to allow gender reassignment procedures for individuals. Since July 1, 2025 by “self-determination” for individuals to change gender.

==== Southern Europe ====
LGBT rights in	Same-sex sexual activity	Recognition of same-sex unions	Same-sex marriage	Adoption by same-sex couples	LGBT people allowed to serve openly in military	Anti-discrimination laws concerning sexual orientation	Laws concerning gender identity/expression
Akrotiri and Dhekelia (Overseas Territory of the United Kingdom)	Yes Legal since 2000; equal age of consent since 2003 + UN decl. sign.	Yes Since 2005, for members of the British Armed Forces	Yes Since 2014, for members of the British Armed Forces		Yes UK responsible for defence	Yes Bans some anti-gay discrimination	
Albania	Yes Legal since 1995 + UN decl. sign.	No	No	No	Yes	Yes Bans all anti-gay discrimination	No legal recognition
Andorra	Yes Legal since 1990 + UN decl. sign.	Yes Stable unions since 2005; Civil unions from 2014–2023, replaced by civil marriage	Yes Legal since 2023	Yes Legal since 2014	Has no military	Yes Bans all anti-gay discrimination	Yes Since 2023, without SRS and sterilization - but with a mandatory 2-year waiting period.
Bosnia and Herzegovina	Yes Legal since 1996 in the Federation of Bosnia and Herzegovina, in Republika Srpska since 1998, and in Brčko District since 2003 + UN decl. sign.	No	No	No	Yes	Yes Bans all anti-gay discrimination	Yes Requires surgery for change
Bulgaria	Yes Legal since 1968; equal age of consent since 2002 + UN decl. sign.	No	No Constitutional ban since 1991	No LGBT individuals may adopt, but not same-sex couples	Yes	Yes Bans all anti-gay discrimination	Yes Forbids discrimination based on gender identity. No Transgender people are not allowed to change gender since 2017.
Croatia	Yes Legal since 1977 (As part of Yugoslavia); equal age of consent since 1998 + UN decl. sign.	Yes Unregistered cohabitation since 2003 Life partnerships since 2014	No Constitutional ban since 2013	Yes Legal since 2022	Yes	Yes Bans all anti-gay discrimination	Yes Act on the elimination of discrimination bans all discrimination based on both gender identity and gender expression. Gender change is regulated by special policy issued by Ministry of Health.
Cyprus	Yes Legal since 1998; equal age of consent since 2002 + UN decl. sign.	Yes Civil cohabitation since 2015	No	No	Yes	Yes Bans some anti-gay discrimination	Yes Forbids some discrimination based on gender identity. Gender change not legal.
Gibraltar (Overseas Territory of the United Kingdom)	Yes Legal since 1993; equal age of consent since 2012 + UN decl. sign.	Yes Civil partnerships since 2014	Yes Legal since 2016	Yes Legal since 2014	Yes UK responsible for defence	Yes Bans all anti-gay discrimination	Yes Forbids discrimination on the grounds of gender reassignment No Gender change is not legal
Greece	Yes Legal since 1951; equal age of consent since 2015 + UN decl. sign.	Yes Cohabitation agreements since 2015	Yes Legal since 2024	Yes Legal since 2024	Yes	Yes Bans all anti-gay discrimination	Yes Under the Legal Gender Recognition Act 2017
Italy	Yes Legal since 1890 + UN decl. sign.	Yes Civil unions since 2016	No In 2018 the Supreme Court ruled that same-sex marriages performed abroad must be registered as civil unions. (Proposed)	Yes / No Stepchild adoption admitted by the Court of Cassation since 2016	Yes	Yes Bans some anti-gay discrimination	Yes Legal recognition and documents can be amended to the recognised gender, sterilisation not required
Kosovo	Yes Legal since 1994 (as part of Yugoslavia); equal age of consent since 2004	No	No	No LGBT individuals may adopt, but not same-sex couples	Yes	Yes Bans all anti-gay discrimination	Yes Forbids discrimination based on gender identity. No legal recognition
Malta	Yes Legal since 1973 + UN decl. sign.	Yes Civil unions since 2014	Yes Legal since 2017	Yes Legal since 2014	Yes	Yes Bans all anti-gay discrimination Pathologization or attempted treatment of sexual orientation by mental health professionals illegal since 2016	Yes Transgender people allowed to change gender; surgery not required since 2015
Montenegro	Yes Legal since 1977 (As part of Yugoslavia) + UN decl. sign.	Yes Life partnership from July 2021	No Constitutional ban since 2007	No	Yes	Yes Bans all anti-gay discrimination	Yes Requires sterilisation and surgery for change
North Macedonia	Yes Legal since 1996 + UN decl. sign.	No	No	No	Yes	Yes Bans all anti-gay discrimination	Yes Forbids discrimination based on gender identity. Gender change is legally recognized since 2021
Northern Cyprus (Disputed territory)	Yes Legal since 2014	No	No	No	No	Yes Bans all anti-gay discrimination	Yes Legal, requires surgery for change
Portugal	Yes Legal since 1983; equal age of consent since 2007 + UN decl. sign.	Yes De facto unions since 2001	Yes Legal since 2010	Yes Legal since 2016	Yes	Yes Bans all anti-gay discrimination	Yes All documents can be amended to the recognised gender since 2011
Romania	Yes Legal since 1996; equal age of consent since 2002 + UN decl. sign.	No	No	No LGBT individuals may adopt, but not same-sex couples	Yes	Yes Bans all anti-gay discrimination	Yes Legal recognition after sex reassignment surgery (sterilisation mandatory)
San Marino	Yes Legal since 1865 + UN decl. sign.	Yes Civil unions since 2019	No	Yes / No Stepchild adoption legal since 2019		Yes Bans all anti-gay discrimination	No legal recognition
Serbia	Yes Legal from 1858, when nominally a vassal of the Ottoman Empire to 1860, and again since 1994 (As part of Yugoslavia); equal age of consent since 2006 + UN decl. sign.	No	No Constitutional ban since 2006	No LGBT individuals may adopt, but not same-sex couples	Yes	Yes Bans all anti-gay discrimination	Yes Legal after 1 year of hormone therapy, surgery no longer required since 2019
Spain	Yes Legal since 1979 + UN decl. sign.	Yes De facto unions in Catalonia (1998), Aragon (1999), Navarre (2000), Castilla–La Mancha (2000), Valencia (2001), the Balearic Islands (2001), Madrid (2001), Asturias (2002), Castile and León (2002), Andalusia (2002), the Canary Islands (2003), Extremadura (2003), Basque Country (2003), Cantabria (2005), Galicia (2008) La Rioja (2010), and Murcia (2018), and in both autonomous cities; Ceuta (1998) and Melilla (2008).	Yes Legal since 2005	Yes Legal since 2005	Yes Includes transgender people	Yes Bans all anti-gay discrimination Pathologization or attempted treatment of sexual orientation by mental health professionals illegal nationwide since 2023.	Yes Since 2023, by way of self-determination
Turkey	Yes Legal since 1858	No	No	No	No	No	Yes Legal since 1988, requires sterilisation and surgery for change
Vatican City	Yes Legal since 1890 (As part of Italy)	No	No	No	Has no military	No	

==== Western Europe ====
LGBT rights in	Same-sex sexual activity	Recognition of same-sex unions	Same-sex marriage	Adoption by same-sex couples	LGBT people allowed to serve openly in military	Anti-discrimination laws concerning sexual orientation	Laws concerning gender identity/expression
Belgium	Yes Legal nationwide since 1795; equal age of consent since 1985 + UN decl. sign.	Yes Legal cohabitation since 2000	Yes Legal since 2003	Yes Legal since 2006	Yes Includes transgender people	Yes Bans all anti-gay discrimination	Yes Since 2018, sex changes do not require sterilisation and surgery
France	Yes Legal nationwide since 1791; Legal in Savoy since 1792; equal age of consent since 1982 + UN decl. sign.	Yes Civil solidarity pact since 1999	Yes Legal since 2013	Yes Legal since 2013	Yes Includes transgender people	Yes Bans all anti-gay discrimination	Yes Since 2017, sex changes no longer requires sterilisation and surgery
(Bailiwick of Guernsey) Guernsey (Crown Dependency of the United Kingdom)	Yes Legal since 1983; equal age of consent since 2012 + UN decl. sign.	Yes Civil partnerships performed in the UK abroad recognised for succession purposes in inheritance and other matters respecting interests in property since 2012 Legal cohabitation since 2017	Yes Legal since 2017 in Guernsey, since 2018 in Alderney, and since 2020 in Sark	Yes Legal since 2017	Yes UK responsible for defence	Yes Bans all anti-gay discrimination	Yes Legal gender changes since 2007
Ireland	Yes Male legal since 1993; Female always legal + UN decl. sign.	Yes Civil partnerships from 2011 to 2015 (existing partnerships are still recognised)	Yes Legal since 2015 after a constitutional referendum	Yes Legal since 2017	Yes Includes transgender people	Yes Bans all anti-gay discrimination	Yes Under the Gender Recognition Act 2015, by self-declaration.
Isle of Man; equal age of consent since 2006 (Crown Dependency of the United Kingdom)	Yes Legal since 1992 + UN decl. sign.	Yes Civil partnerships since 2011	Yes Legal since 2016	Yes Legal since 2011	Yes UK responsible for defence	Yes Bans all anti-gay discrimination	Yes Transgender people are allowed to change their legal gender and to have their new gender recognised as a result of the Gender Recognition Act 2009 (c.11)
Jersey; equal age of consent since 2006 (Crown Dependency of the United Kingdom)	Yes Legal since 1990 + UN decl. sign.	Yes Civil partnerships since 2012	Yes Legal since 2018	Yes Legal since 2012	Yes UK responsible for defence	Yes Bans all anti-gay discrimination	Yes Under the Gender Recognition (Jersey) Law 2010
Luxembourg	Yes Legal since 1795; equal age of consent since 1992 + UN decl. sign.	Yes Registered partnerships since 2004	Yes Legal since 2015	Yes Legal since 2015	Yes	Yes Bans all anti-gay discrimination	Yes No divorce, sterilization and/or surgery legally required since September 2018 for change of gender
Monaco	Yes Legal since 1793 + UN decl. sign.	Yes Cohabitation agreements since 2020	No (Proposed)	No	Yes France responsible for defence	Yes Bans some anti-gay discrimination	
Netherlands	Yes Legal since 1811; equal age of consent since 1971 + UN decl. sign.	Yes Registered partnership since 1998	Yes Legal since 2001	Yes Legal since 2001	Yes Includes transgender people	Yes Bans all anti-gay discrimination	Yes Since 2014, sex changes do not require sterilisation and surgery
United Kingdom	Yes Female always legal. Male legal in England and Wales since 1967, in Scotland since 1981, and in Northern Ireland since 1982; equal age of consent since 2001 + UN decl. sign.	Yes Civil partnerships since 2005	Yes Legal in England, Wales, and Scotland since 2014, and Northern Ireland since 2020	Yes Legal in England and Wales since 2005, in Scotland since 2009 and Northern Ireland since 2013	Yes Since 2000; Includes transgender people	Yes Bans all anti-gay discrimination	Yes / No Under the Gender Recognition Act 2004, except for the purpose of hereditary peerage inheritance

=== Oceania ===
==== Australasia ====
LGBT rights in:	Same-sex sexual activity	Recognition of same-sex unions	Same-sex marriage	Adoption by same-sex couples	LGBT people allowed to serve openly in military?	Anti-discrimination laws concerning sexual orientation	Laws concerning gender identity/expression
Australia (including territories of Christmas Island, the Cocos (Keeling) Islands and Norfolk Island)	Yes Always legal for women. Male legal in some states and territories since 1975, nationwide since 1997. Tasmania was the last state to legalise male homosexuality; Equal age of consent in some states and territories since 1975, nationwide since 2016. + UN decl. sign.	Yes Unregistered cohabitation nationally since 2009; Domestic partnerships in Tasmania (2004), South Australia (2007), Victoria (2008), New South Wales (2010), and Queensland (2012); Civil unions in the Australian Capital Territory (2012)	Yes Legal since 2017	Yes Legal nationwide since 2018	Yes Gay men and lesbians since 1992; Transgender and intersex people since 2010	Yes Bans all anti-gay discrimination.	Yes / No Since 2025, differing regulations within each jurisdiction regarding change of sex on a birth certificate applies - for example some jurisdictions still requires “appropriate clinical treatment” (WA, SA & NT), while others are based on “self-determination” (TAS, VIC, NSW, ACT & QLD).. Gender identity change is not recognized for the purpose of inheritance of hereditary peerages and baronetcies, which is subject to Section 16 of the United Kingdom's Gender Recognition Act 2004.
Norfolk Island (external territory of Australia)	Yes Always legal for women. Male legal since 1993. + UN decl. sign.	Yes Since 2010	Yes Legal since 2017	Yes Legal since 2010	Yes Australia responsible for defence	Yes Bans all anti-gay discrimination.	Yes / No Based on "self-determination" (New South Wales law).. Gender identity change is not recognized for the purpose of inheritance of hereditary peerages and baronetcies, which is subject to Section 16 of the United Kingdom's Gender Recognition Act 2004.
New Zealand	Yes Legal since 1986 + UN decl. sign.	Yes Unregistered cohabitation since 2002; Civil unions since 2005	Yes Legal since 2013	Yes Legal since 2013	Yes Since 1993; Includes transgender people	Yes Bans all anti-gay discrimination	Yes Covered under the "sex discrimination" provision of the Human Rights Act 1993; Since July 2023, gender self-determination implemented by legislation on a birth certificate.

==== Melanesia ====
LGBT rights in:	Same-sex sexual activity	Recognition of same-sex unions	Same-sex marriage	Adoption by same-sex couples	LGBT people allowed to serve openly in military?	Anti-discrimination laws concerning sexual orientation	Laws concerning gender identity/expression
Fiji	Yes Legal since 2010 + UN decl. sign.	No	No	No		Yes Bans all anti-gay discrimination Pathologization or attempted treatment of sexual orientation by mental health professionals illegal since 2010	
New Caledonia (Special collectivity of France)	Yes Legal (No laws against same-sex sexual activity have ever existed in the collectivity) + UN decl. sign.	Yes Civil solidarity pact since 2009	Yes Legal since 2013	Yes Legal since 2013	Yes France responsible for defence	Yes Bans all anti-gay discrimination	Yes Under French law
Papua New Guinea	No Male illegal since 1899; Penalty: 3 to 14 years imprisonment (Rarely enforced, Legalization proposed). Yes Female always legal	No	No	No	No	Yes Bans some anti-gay discrimination	No
Solomon Islands	No Illegal since 1963; Penalty: Up to 14 years imprisonment (Not enforced, Legalization proposed).	No	No	No	Has no military	Yes Bans some anti-gay discrimination	No
Vanuatu	Yes Legal (No laws against same-sex sexual activity have ever existed since independence) + UN decl. sign.	No	No	No		Yes Bans some anti-gay discrimination	No

==== Micronesia ====
LGBT rights in:	Same-sex sexual activity	Recognition of same-sex unions	Same-sex marriage	Adoption by same-sex couples	LGBT people allowed to serve openly in military?	Anti-discrimination laws concerning sexual orientation	Laws concerning gender identity/expression	Lack of a Presence of Anti-LGBT laws
Guam (Unincorporated territory of the United States)	Yes Legal since 1978	Yes Since 2015	Yes Legal since 2015	Yes Legal since 2002	Yes United States responsible for defense	Yes Bans some anti-gay discrimination	Yes Allowed to legally change gender, but requires sex reassignment surgery	Yes
(Federated States of Micronesia) Micronesia	Yes Legal + UN decl. sign.	No	No	No	Has no military	Yes Bans all anti-gay discrimination		
Kiribati	No Male illegal since 1943; Penalty: 5-14 years imprisonment (Not enforced, Legalization proposed). Yes Female legal	No	No	No	Has no military	Yes Bans some anti-gay discrimination	No	
Marshall Islands	Yes Legal since 2005 + UN decl. sign.	No	No	No	Has no military	Yes Bans all anti-gay discrimination		
Nauru	Yes Legal since 2016 + UN decl. sign.	No	No	No	Has no military	Yes; Pathologization or attempted treatment of sexual orientation by mental health professionals illegal since 2016	No	
Northern Mariana Islands (Unincorporated territory of the United States)	Yes Legal since 1983	Yes Since 2015	Yes Legal since 2015	Yes Legal since 2015	Yes United States responsible for defense	Yes Bans some anti-gay discrimination	Yes Under the Vital Statistics Act of 2006	Yes
Palau	Yes Legal since 2014 + UN decl. sign.	No	No Constitutional ban since 2008	No	Has no military	Yes Bans some anti-gay discrimination	No	
United States Minor Outlying Islands (Unincorporated territories of the United States)	Yes Legal	Yes	Yes Legal	Yes Legal	Yes United States responsible for defense	Yes Bans some anti-gay discrimination	No	Yes

==== Polynesia ====
LGBT rights in:	Same-sex sexual activity	Recognition of same-sex unions	Same-sex marriage	Adoption by same-sex couples	LGBT people allowed to serve openly in military?	Anti-discrimination laws concerning sexual orientation	Laws concerning gender identity/expression
American Samoa (Unincorporated territory of the United States)	Yes Legal since 1980	No / Yes Same-sex marriages recognized but not performed under Respect for Marriage Act since 2022.	No / Yes Same-sex marriages recognized but not performed under Respect for Marriage Act since 2022.	No	Yes United States responsible for defense	Yes Bans some anti-gay discrimination	Yes
Cook Islands (Part of the Realm of New Zealand)	Yes Legal since 2023 + UN decl. sign.	No	No	No	Yes New Zealand responsible for defence	Yes Bans some anti-gay discrimination	No
Easter Island (Special territory of Chile)	Yes Legal since 1999 + UN decl.	Yes Civil unions since 2015	Yes Since 2022	Yes Since 2022	Yes Chile responsible for defence	Yes Bans all anti-gay discrimination Pathologization or attempted treatment of sexual orientation by mental health professionals illegal since 2021	Yes Transgender persons can change their legal gender and name since 1974. No surgeries or judicial order since 2019.
French Polynesia (Overseas collectivity of France)	Yes Legal (No laws against same-sex sexual activity have ever existed in the collectivity) + UN decl. sign.	Yes Since 2013	Yes Legal since 2013	Yes Legal since 2013	Yes France responsible for defence	Yes Bans all anti-gay discrimination	Yes Under French law
Hawaii (Constituent state of the United States)	Yes Since 1972	Yes Since 1997	Yes Since 2013	Yes Since 2012	Yes United States responsible for defence	Yes Bans all anti-gay discrimination	Yes
Niue (Part of the Realm of New Zealand)	Yes Legal since 2024 + UN decl. sign.	No	No	No	Yes New Zealand responsible for defence	No	
Pitcairn Islands (Overseas Territory of the United Kingdom)	Yes Legal since 2001 + UN decl. sign.	Yes Since 2015	Yes Legal since 2015	Yes Legal since 2015	Yes UK responsible for defence	Yes Constitutional ban on all anti-gay discrimination	
Samoa	No Male illegal since 1961; Penalty: 5-7 years imprisonment (Not enforced, Legalization proposed); Yes Female always legal + UN decl. sign.	No	No	No	Has no military	Yes Bans some anti-gay discrimination Pathologization or attempted treatment of sexual orientation by mental health professionals illegal since 2007	Samoa has a large transgender or "third-gender" community called the fa'afafine. They are a recognized part of traditional Samoan customs.
Tokelau (Dependent territory of the Realm of New Zealand)	Yes Legal since 2007 + UN decl. sign.	No	No	No	Yes New Zealand responsible for defence	No	No
Tonga	No Male illegal since 1988; Penalty: Up to 10 years imprisonment (Not enforced, Legalization proposed). Yes Female always legal	No	No	No	No	Yes Bans some anti-gay discrimination	No
Tuvalu	No Male illegal since 1965; Penalty: Up to 14 years imprisonment (Not enforced, Legalization proposed); Yes Female legal + UN decl. sign.	No	No Constitutional ban since 2023	No	Has no military	Yes Bans some anti-gay discrimination	
Wallis and Futuna (Overseas collectivity of France)	Yes Legal (No laws against same-sex sexual activity have ever existed in the collectivity) + UN decl. sign.	Yes Civil solidarity pact since 2009	Yes Legal since 2013	Yes Legal since 2013	Yes France responsible for defence	Yes Bans all anti-gay discrimination	Yes Under French law

== See also ==
- Capital punishment for non-violent offenses
- Criminalization of homosexuality
- Decriminalization of homosexuality
- Discrimination against LGBTQ people
- Human rights
- Legal status of transgender people
- Legality of conversion therapy
- LGBTQ people in prison
- Minority rights
- Societal attitudes toward homosexuality
- LGBTQ refugees and asylum seekers
