= LGBTQ rights in South Ossetia =

- South Ossetia
- Legal status: Not protected

Lesbian, gay, bisexual, transgender and queer (LGBTQ) people in South Ossetia face significant challenges not experienced by non-LGBTQ residents.

== Status ==
According to a 2019 Freedom House report, South Ossetia is a "very conservative" society and there are "no initiatives" to support the rights of LGBT people. A 2023 report stated that nominal protections of individual rights under the law "are not well enforced", and that there are "few specific or effective safeguards against discrimination based on race, ethnicity, gender, and other such categories".

In 2024, the Interior Ministry of South Ossetia announced a new drafted law that would ban "LGBT propaganda and the display of non-traditional sexual preferences." This mirrors similar legislation in Russia.

== See also ==
- Human rights in South Ossetia
- LGBTQ rights in Abkhazia
- LGBTQ rights in Georgia
