= LGBTQ rights in Nauru =

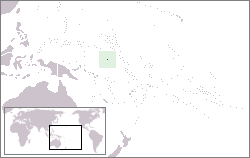
- Nauru
- Legal status: Legal since 2016
- Military: The nation has no military.
- Discrimination protections: Some limited protections in place.

Family rights
- Recognition of relationships: Not recognised by the government directly.
- Adoption: Adoption recognised to single LGBT people, and couples must have only one person in a relationship adopt.

Lesbian, gay, bisexual, transgender, and queer (LGBTQ) people living in Nauru may face legal and social challenges not experienced by non-LGBTQ residents. Same-sex sexual activity has been legal since May 2016, but there are no legal recognition of same-sex unions, or protections against discrimination in the workplace or the provision of goods and services.

The Human Truth Foundation has listed Nauru at rank 83 for LGBTQ rights. This was similar to other Pacific nations, such as Palau (83), the Marshall Islands (83) and Micronesia (83).

In 2011, Nauru signed the "joint statement on ending acts of violence and related human rights violations based on sexual orientation and gender identity" at the United Nations, condemning violence and discrimination against LGBTQ people.

== Legality of same-sex sexual activity ==
Homosexuality was criminalised under the German protectorate in 1899. Following the Australian occupation of Nauru and declaration of a League of Nations mandate, new sodomy laws were introduced in 1921 when the Australian administration applied the criminal code of the Australian state of Queensland. Those laws were retained following Nauruan independence in 1968.

In January 2011, Mathew Batsiua, Minister for Health, Justice and Sports, stated that the decriminalisation of "homosexual activity between consenting adults" was "under active consideration". In October 2011, the Nauruan Government pledged to decriminalise same-sex sexual acts.

According to the United States Department of State, there were no reports in 2012 of prosecutions directed at LGBTQ persons.

In May 2016, the Parliament of Nauru passed the Crimes Act 2016 which repealed the Criminal Code 1899 and therefore legalised same-sex sexual activity.

== Recognition of same-sex relationships ==
There is no legal recognition of same-sex couples. The Births Deaths and Marriages Registration Act 2017 states in its Section 49 that "Marriage in the Republic shall be the voluntary union of one man and one woman." Section 70 states that "A marriage solemnised in a foreign country shall not be recognised as a marriage in the Republic if the marriage is (a) between a male and another male; (b) between a female and another female.

== Discrimination protections ==
Nauruan law does not address discrimination on account of sexual orientation or gender identity in employment or the provision of goods and services.

The Leadership Code Act 2016, which was passed in June 2016, states that a "leader" must not "discriminate between persons participating in or seeking to participate in Government on account of their age, race, ethnicity, gender, disability, sexual orientation, religious beliefs, place of origin or political beliefs or opinions". The term "leader" includes the office of president, speaker and deputy speaker of parliament, cabinet minister, member of parliament, judicial officers, ambassadors, electoral commissioners, commissioner of police, chief justice, etc.

The Mentally-disordered Persons (Amendment) Act 2016 states that a "person is not [to] be regarded as mentally disordered by reasons only that: [...] the person expresses or exhibits or refuses or fails to express, or has expressed or has refused or failed to express, a particular sexual preference or sexual orientation".

The Nauru Regional Processing Centre Rules 2014 bans discrimination against any person because of their sex or gender, sexual preference or gender identity. These rules are made under Division 2 of the Asylum Seekers (Regional Processing Centre) Act 2012.

== Summary table ==
Same-sex sexual activity legal	Yes (Since 2016)
Equal age of consent	Yes (Since 2016)
Anti-discrimination laws in employment only	No
Anti-discrimination laws in the provision of goods and services	No
Anti-discrimination laws in all other areas (Incl. indirect discrimination, hate speech)	No
Same-sex marriages	No
Recognition of same-sex couples	No
Stepchild adoption by same-sex couples	No
Joint adoption by same-sex couples	No
LGBTQ people allowed to serve openly in the military	Has no military
Right to change legal gender	No
Conversion therapy by medical professionals banned	Yes (Since 2016)
Access to IVF for lesbians	No
Commercial surrogacy for gay male couples	No
Sexual orientation and gender identity protections for asylum requests	Yes (Since 2014)
MSMs allowed to donate blood	No

== See also ==
- Human rights in Nauru
- LGBTQ rights in Oceania
