= LGBTQ rights in Nicaragua =

- Nicaragua
- Legal status: Legal since 2008
- Gender identity: No
- Military: No
- Discrimination protections: Sexual orientation and gender identity protections (see below)

Family rights
- Recognition of relationships: No recognition of same-sex couples
- Adoption: No

Lesbian, gay, bisexual, transgender, and queer (LGBTQ) people in Nicaragua face legal challenges not experienced by non-LGBTQ residents. Both male and female types of same-sex sexual activity are legal in Nicaragua. Discrimination based on sexual orientation is banned in certain areas, including in employment and access to health services.

According to Nicaraguan LGBT group Movimiento de la Diversidad Sexual (Movement of Sexual Diversity), there are approximately 600,000 gay people living in Nicaragua.

== Legality of same-sex sexual activity ==
Both male and female same-sex sexual activity have been legal in Nicaragua since March 2008. The age of consent is 16, regardless of sexual orientation or gender, and all sexual offenses are gender-neutral, according to articles 168, 170, 172 and 175 of the Criminal Code of Nicaragua.

== Recognition of same-sex relationships ==
Homosexuality laws in Central America and the Caribbean Islands. Same-sex marriage Other type of partnership Unregistered cohabitation No recognition of same-sex couples Constitution limits marriage to opposite-sex couples Same-sex sexual activity illegal but law not enforced

Same-sex couples and households headed by same-sex couples are not eligible for the same legal benefits and protections available to opposite-sex married couples.

In June 2014, the Nicaraguan Congress approved a revised family code that would limit marriage, partnerships and adoption to heterosexual couples. On 8 April 2015, the new Family Code went into effect. Several organizations filed an action of unconstitutionality against the Code.

Article 72 of the Constitution of Nicaragua states that:

Marriage and stable unions are protected by the State; they rest on the voluntary agreement between a man and a woman, and may be dissolved by mutual consent or by the shall of one of the parties. The law shall regulate this matter. (Note: In Spanish: El matrimonio y la unión de hecho estable están protegidos por el Estado; descansan en el acuerdo voluntario del hombre y la mujer y podrán disolverse por el mutuo consentimiento o por la voluntad de una de las partes. La ley regulará esta materia. In Miskito: Upla Marit taki wal bri ba ban kasak kaina sunanka brisa kuntri bui; baha ba bara sa waitna bara mairin wal wilin bara sipsa wal dakbi sakaia wal aikupia laka kaka apia kaka maya kum baman luki sa kaka. In Mayangna: Marit lani dawak muih yalni kapat duwi yalahwa kidika Gabamint parasni yaklauwi tanitdakwa ki; kidika laih, al dawak yal karak yulbauwi wilin kalahwi kulnin aslah barangni kalalahna ki, dawak sip karak dakwi kalahnin witinna kulninna lani kat, awaskat as yaklauwi kapat yulwarang kat. La yaklauwi adika dini laihwi yamna karang.)

On 9 January 2018, the Inter-American Court of Human Rights (IACHR) issued an advisory opinion that parties to the American Convention on Human Rights should grant same-sex couples "accession to all existing domestic legal systems of family registration, including marriage, along with all rights that derive from marriage". The advisory opinion states that:

The State must recognize and guarantee all rights derived from a family bond between persons of the same sex in accordance with the provisions of Articles 11.2 and 17.1 of the American Convention. (...) in accordance with articles 1.1, 2, 11.2, 17 and 24 of the American Convention, it is necessary to guarantee access to all the existing figures in domestic legal systems, including the right to marry. (...) To ensure the protection of all the rights of families formed by same-sex couples, without discrimination with respect to those that are constituted by heterosexual couples.

== Discrimination protections ==
Article 315 of the Penal Code on "offenses against labor rights", states that discrimination based on "sexual option", is punishable with up to one year in prison.

Article 3(l) of Law N° 820 for the Promotion, Protection and Defense of Human Rights in the face of HIV and AIDS, for its Prevention and Attention (Spanish: Ley núm. 820 de promoción, protección y defensa de los derechos humanos ante el VIH y SIDA para su prevención y atención) prohibits discrimination based on sexual orientation (among other grounds).

Article 1 of Ministerial Resolution 671-2014 prohibits discrimination based on sexual orientation, gender identity and gender expression in access to health services.

=== Hate crime law ===
According to Article 36(5) of the Penal Code, an aggravating circumstance exists when a person is motivated by discrimination based on sexual orientation while committing a criminal offense.

A 2012 survey by the Center for Justice and International Law found that 53 aggressions against LGBT people had occurred between 1999 and 2011. Of these, 15 involved murders (10 gay men, 4 transgender people and 1 lesbian). The actual number of homicides and violent attacks is expected to be higher, as many victims choose not to denounce the attacks to the police.

== Violence ==
Violence against the LGBTQ community in Nicaragua is generally culturally accepted and legally unenforced. Instances of violence are largely unreported out of fear of retaliation and dismal legal results. Reporting in the media is largely suppressed as much of the Nicaraguan media is since the 2018 protests.

=== Statistics ===
Reliable statistics on instances of violence are limited and inconsistent. Programa Feminista La Corriente is a Nicaraguan based NGO that releases quarterly and annual reports of violence. The reports include both raw statistics and short descriptions of cases. The nature of cases including the relationship of the perpetrator and location of the violence show the scale of the issue and the openness with which perpetrators act.

For the 2021 annual release, La Corriente reported 67 assaults, 1 hate crime/murder, and 2 suicides with the majority of aggressions happening to trans women. The aggressors were for the most part either family members or strangers with the aggressions being located in the street or in houses. Acquaintances and state police both committed 10 documented aggressions.

In 2022, La Corriente reported 39 assaults, 3 hate crimes, and 1 suicide. Trans women continued to be the most targeted group with gay men being the second most targeted group. The street and at home were again the most common places but this year, state police tied family members in number of assaults.

In 2023 more categories were added including sexual assault and Extortion. The organization reported 35 assaults, 2 hate crimes, 1 murder, 1 suicide, 2 sexual assaults, and 1 case of extortion. Many of the demographic statistics were consistent with previous years.

For 2024, there are only 2 quarters that have been released as of April 2025. Based on previous years, the rest of the year and the annual report should have been released by now. The data that has been released is 13 assaults, 5 hate crimes, and 1 person missing. These results are fairly similar to the first 2 quarters of 2023.

== Social conditions ==
Gay men are generally more visible in public than lesbians are. When lesbians socialize with each other, it often happens in private residences or other private places.

== LGBT history in Nicaragua ==
Many LGBT Nicaraguans held prominent roles during the Sandinista Revolution; however, LGBT rights were not a priority to the Sandinista Government because the majority of the population were Roman Catholic. Protecting those rights was also considered politically risky and bound to be met with hostility from the Roman Catholic Church, which already had bad relations with the government. On the tenth anniversary of the Sandinista Revolution (1989), many community centers were launched for LGBT people. The centers began to form after a march by activists that took place in Managua.

After the United States lifted the economic embargo against Nicaragua, many non-governmental organizations (NGOs) promoting LGBT rights began to operate in the country. As a result, Nicaragua hosted its first public gay pride festival in 1991. The annual Gay Pride celebration in Managua, held around 28 June, still occurs and is used to commemorate the uprising of the Stonewall riots in New York City.

After gaining support, the LGBT community suffered a setback when a bill formerly written to protect women from rape and sexual abuse was changed by social Christians in the National Assembly. The change imposed a sentence of up to three years in prison for "anyone who induces, promotes, propagandizes, or practices sex among persons of the same sex in a scandalous manner." It also included any unmarried sex acts. Activists and their allies protested in Nicaragua and at embassies abroad; however, President Violeta Chamorro signed the bill into a law in July 1992 as Article 204 of the Nicaragua Criminal Code.

In November 1992, a coalition known as the Campaign for Sexuality without Prejudices (Campaña por una Sexualidad sin Prejuicios), composed of lawyers, lesbians, and gay activists, among others, presented an appeal to the Supreme Court of Justice challenging the law as unconstitutional. The Supreme Court rejected the appeal in March 1994. On 1 March 2008, a new Penal Code took effect. It omitted the language in the now-repealed Article 204 and, by doing so, decriminalized sex out of wedlock and gay sex between consenting adults.

=== United Nations ===
Since legalizing homosexuality in 2008, Nicaragua has been active on the international level in supporting LGBT rights. In 2011, Nicaragua signed the "joint statement on ending acts of violence and related human rights violations based on sexual orientation and gender identity" at the United Nations, condemning violence and discrimination against LGBT people.

The Nicaraguan Government has also urged countries to repeal their sodomy bans, including Antigua and Barbuda.

== Public opinion ==
According to a Pew Research Center survey, conducted between 9 November and 13 December 2013, 77% of Nicaraguans opposed same-sex marriage, 16% were in favor and 7% did not know.

The 2017 AmericasBarometer showed that 24.5% of Nicaraguans supported same-sex marriage.

== Summary table ==
Same-sex sexual activity legal	Yes (Since 2008)
Equal age of consent (16)	Yes (Since 2008)
Anti-discrimination laws in employment	Yes (Since 2008)
Anti-discrimination laws in education	No
Anti-discrimination laws in the provision of goods and services	No
Anti-discrimination laws in other areas (health)	Yes (Since 2014)
Hate crime law includes sexual orientation	Yes (Since 2008)
Same-sex marriage	No
Recognition of same-sex couples	No
Stepchild adoption by same-sex couples	No
Joint adoption by same-sex couples	No
LGBT people allowed to serve openly in the military	No
Right to change legal gender	No
Conversion therapy banned on minors	No
Access to IVF for lesbians	No
Commercial surrogacy for gay male couples	No
MSMs allowed to donate blood	No

== See also ==
- LGBT rights in the Americas
