= LGBTQ rights in Abkhazia =

- Abkhazia
- Legal status: Not protected

Lesbian, gay, bisexual, transgender, and queer (LGBTQ) people in Abkhazia are not legally protected from discrimination and face social challenges not experienced by non-LGBTQ residents. According to a 2018 report by the US-based Freedom House organization, Abkhazia is a socially conservative society and social taboos exist against LGBTQ individuals.

As a de jure part of Georgia, same-sex marriage, adoptions by same-sex couples, gender-affirming care, and media depictions of LGBTQ people are de jure banned in Abkhazia, as with the rest of Georgia's internationally recognized territory.

== Status ==
The US-based Freedom House organization stated in its 2018 Freedom in the World report that LGBTQ people in Abkhazia are not legally protected from discrimination. It further stated that, as a conservative society, taboos remain in Abkhazia against lifestyles viewed as "non-traditional", including homosexuality and gender nonconformity. The LGBTQ rights group Equaldex similarly notes that there are no legal protections for LGBTQ people against housing discrimination or employment discrimination.

== Developments ==
On 16 November 2021, a rainbow flag was shown as part of a fifth-grade classroom presentation in Sukhumi to mark the International Day for Tolerance. The presentation was attended by parents of the students and members of the ministry for education. Some of the parents complained about its display to law enforcement, prompting a response from the ministry for internal affairs that the rainbow flag used was meant to symbolize world peace. Commentators noted, however, that the display of the rainbow flag, even to represent LGBTQ people, is not prohibited by Abkhazian law.

On 17 September 2024, Georgia's parliament passed legislation which banned same-sex marriage, adoptions by same-sex couples, gender-affirming care, and media depictions of LGBTQ people. As a de jure part of Georgia, the ban is supposed to apply to Abkhazia as well, even if not in actual practice.

== See also ==
- Human rights in Abkhazia
- LGBT rights in Georgia
- LGBT rights in South Ossetia
