= LGBTQ rights in Monaco =

- Location of Monaco (dark green) in Europe (dark grey) – [Legend]
- Legal status: Legal since 1793 (as part of France)
- Military: No armed forces, but there is a National Guard, also France responsible for defence
- Discrimination protections: Hate speech and incitement to hatred banned

Family rights
- Recognition of relationships: Cohabitation agreements since June 2020
- Adoption: No

Lesbian, gay, bisexual, transgender and queer (LGBTQ) people in Monaco may face legal challenges not experienced by non-LGBTQ residents. Both male and female types of same-sex sexual activity are legal in Monaco. However, same-sex couples and households headed by same-sex couples are not eligible for the same legal protections available to opposite-sex married couples. Monaco is the least developed among Western European countries in terms of LGBTQ equality.

In 2019, ILGA-Europe ranked Monaco 45th out of 49 European countries in relation to LGBTQ rights legislation, noting that the country possesses no laws protecting LGBTQ people from discrimination in employment or other areas, does not recognize same-sex marriage and does not permit transgender people to alter their legal gender. Despite this absence of legislation, Monegasque society tends to be tolerant of homosexuality and same-sex relationships. Hate speech and incitement to hatred based on sexual orientation are banned.

== Law regarding same-sex sexual activity ==
Same-sex sexual activity is legal. Criminal penalties for homosexual acts were eliminated in 1793 due to the adoption of French laws. The age of consent is 15 for both same-sex and opposite-sex sexual relationships.

== Recognition of same-sex relationships ==
Monaco does not recognize same-sex marriages. Since 27 June 2020, the country has allowed same-sex couples to sign a cohabitation agreement (French: contrat de vie commune), which provides some limited rights and obligations.

The cohabitation agreement bill was introduced to the Monegasque Parliament on 16 April 2018. Under the bill, cohabiting same-sex and opposite-sex couples would be considered on par with siblings for inheritance taxes and not at the same level as married couples. The agreement, which is open to siblings and parents and children as well, also provides an enumerated set of property rights and reciprocal obligations. The contrat is signed in front of a notary and then deposited at a public registry. On 4 December 2019, the National Council unanimously approved the bill. The law entered into force in 2020, six months after its publication in the Journal de Monaco.

== Adoption and family planning ==
Same-sex couples do not have the right to adopt children.

== Discrimination protections ==
The Constitution of Monaco does not expressly address discrimination or harassment on the basis of sexual orientation or gender identity. It does provide for general civil rights protections, including equality before the law, due process, privacy rights, freedom of religion and opinion.

Loi n° 1.299 du 15 juillet 2005 sur la liberté d'expression publique prohibits hate speech, incitement to hatred and violence and discrimination against political candidates on the basis of their sex, disability, origin, sexual orientation and of their real or perceived belonging or non-belonging to a race, ethnic group, nation or religion. Article 234-2 of the Civil Code, as amended by the Loi n° 1.435 du 8 novembre 2016 relative à la lutte contre la criminalité technologique, states:

When they are committed toward a person or group of persons based on their sex, disability, origin, sexual orientation, belonging or non-belonging, true or perceived, to an ethnicity, nation or race, membership or non-membership, true or perceived, to a religion, threats provided for at article 230 are punished with imprisonment of two to five years and of the fine provided for at article 26, those provided for at articles 233 and 234 are punished with imprisonment of six months to three years and the fine provided for at article 26-3.

In July 2010, a Monegasque court convicted a man to five days in jail and ordered him to pay a fine of 5,000 euros after he used openly homophobic rhetoric against a gay man.

In July 2011, the Monegasque Parliament adopted an anti-discrimination and anti-harassment bill, going further than the 2005 law. The main articles concerning LGBT people were: article 1, which outlawed discrimination based on, among other categories, "sex, true or perceived sexual orientation, civil status [and] family situation"; article 3, which applied this prohibition to the workplace in both the public and private sector, contacts with administrations, access and delivery to goods and services (accommodation was not namely cited but included in this category), family relationships, access to recreational, cultural or public locations or events, among other situations; article 8, which precised that discrimination at work may not occur concerning access or working conditions, remuneration conditions, disciplinary measures and firing conditions, article 10 which provided for certain justified exceptions, if conditions about sex and religious or philosophical beliefs were essentially inherent (for instance, churches and other religious communities could still fire or refuse to hire a person based on Article 1 categories); Article 40, which provided for penalties in case of defamation or non-public insult connected to true or purported sexual orientation, among other reasons; and article 44, which provided for the creation of a school program to sensibilize against racism and all Article 1 discriminations, every year of primary and secondary school cycles. The Council of Government did not approve the bill, and proposed a new one instead on 18 December 2012. It did not include the provisions in regards to discrimination based on sexual orientation.

Law n° 1.478 of 12 November 2019 concerning modifications of certain provisions relating to penalties (French: Loi n° 1.478 du 12 novembre 2019 portant modification de certaines dispositions relatives aux peines) amended three articles of the Monegasque Civil Code to include the term "sexual orientation", namely article 238-1, which punishes violent actions committed based on sexual orientation that did not result in the victim's "illness or total incapacity to work", with imprisonment varying between six months to one year; article 239, which provides for ten years' imprisonment for someone who attacked their partner (or any person living under the same roof) based on sexual orientation; and article 421, which provides for penalties of five years' probation or other measures provided for at article 29-4 for those who, without reason, attacked a person, or a group of people, based on their sexual orientation (among other categories).

== Military service ==
Monaco has no armed forces, but there is a National Guard. France, which is responsible for the country's defence, allows openly gay, lesbian, bisexual and transgender people to serve in the military.

== Living conditions ==
Most Monegasques affiliate with the Catholic Church, which traditionally views homosexuality and transgender identity as signs of immorality. Monaco is not a member of the European Union, which requires its members to respect certain LGBT rights protections, but Monaco and its people have a strong cultural and economic relationship with France.

The LGBT community in Monaco does support some gay-friendly establishments within the country itself. There are no official gay bars, clubs or events to be found in Monaco, as there are in the nearby French cities of Marseille, Nice and Lyon.

In June 2017, Pauline Ducruet, the eldest daughter of Princess Stéphanie of Monaco and granddaughter of Rainier III, Prince of Monaco and American actress Grace Kelly, marched in the New York City Pride parade, expressing support for LGBTQ rights.

== Summary table ==
Same-sex sexual activity legal	Yes (Since 1793)
Equal age of consent (15)	Yes (Since 1793)
Anti-discrimination laws in employment	No
Anti-discrimination laws in the provision of goods and services	No
Anti-discrimination laws in all other areas (incl. indirect discrimination, hate speech)	Yes (Since 2005)
Anti-discrimination laws concerning gender identity	No
Same-sex marriage	No
Recognition of same-sex couples	Yes (Since 2020)
Stepchild adoption by same-sex couples	No
Joint adoption by same-sex couples	No
LGBTQ people allowed to serve openly in the military	Has no military
Right to change legal gender	No
Conversion therapy banned on minors	No
Access to IVF for lesbians	No
Commercial surrogacy for gay male couples	No (Not allowed regardless of sexual orientation)
MSMs allowed to donate blood	

== See also ==
- Politics of Monaco
- LGBTQ rights in Europe
