= LGBTQ rights in the Federated States of Micronesia =

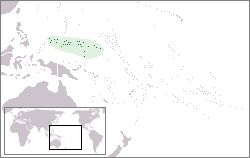
- Federated States of Micronesia
- Legal status: Legal
- Gender identity: No
- Military: Has no military
- Discrimination protections: Sexual orientation protections

Family rights
- Recognition of relationships: No recognition of same-sex couples
- Adoption: No

Lesbian, gay, bisexual, transgender, and queer (LGBTQ) people in Micronesia may face legal difficulties not experienced by non-LGBTQ residents. Households headed by same-sex couples are not eligible for the same legal protections available to opposite-sex married couples, as same-sex marriage and civil unions are not recognized. Discrimination on the basis of sexual orientation has been illegal since 2018.

The Federated States of Micronesia encompasses more than 600 islands and about 100,000 people. The majority of the population identifies as Christian.

In 2011, Micronesia signed the "joint statement on ending acts of violence and related human rights violations based on sexual orientation and gender identity" at the United Nations, condemning violence and discrimination against LGBTQ people.

== Law regarding same-sex sexual activity ==
Same-sex sexual activity is legal. It was decriminalized in 1982. The age of consent is 14, regardless of gender and sexual orientation.

== Recognition of same-sex relationships ==
The Federated States of Micronesia does not recognise same-sex unions in any form.

The marriage laws in Kosrae assume the partners to be of the opposite sex. Section 16.101 states: "A marriage performed in the State is valid, if: (a) The male at the time of marriage is at least eighteen years of age and the female at least sixteen years of age, and, if the female is less than eighteen years of age, the marriage has the consent of at least one of the female's parents or her guardian; [...]". (Note: In Kosraean: Pahyuck se oreklac ke State ac akihlenyuck, efin: (a) Mukul se ke pacl in pahyuck an year singucul alkosr matwac ac muhtwacn sacn tiac srihk liki year singucul ohnkohsr matwacl, ac, efin muhtwacn sacn srihk liki year singucul alkosr, pahyuck sacn oasr inseselac luhn sie sin pahpah kuh ninac kuh mwet karihngihn muhtwacn sacn; [...].) Similar language is found in the Chuuk State Code.

The Constitution of Pohnpei does not address marriage, but its section on "family obligations" states: "To strengthen and retain good family relations in Pohnpei, as needed, this Constitution recognizes and protects the responsibility and authority of parents over their children". (Note: In Pohnpeian: Pwehn kakehlaka oh kolokol onepek mwhau oh wahu penehn nan peneinei kan en Weipokon en Pohnpei, nin duwen ahnepetail, Poahsoan en Kosonned wet pohnese oh wauneki manaman oh pwukoah me sahm akan oh ihn akan akneki ong neirail serihkan.)

== Discrimination protections ==
The Federated States of Micronesia has an anti-discrimination law that includes sexual orientation, but not gender identity or intersex status. This means gay, lesbian and bisexual people are protected from discrimination in employment, education, health care and other areas of public life, but transgender and intersex people are not. According to a 2015 write-up from the United States Department of State, "there were no reports of societal violence or discrimination against homosexuals or against persons with HIV/AIDS."

In 2016, Micronesia received recommendations from five countries to prohibit discrimination on the basis of sexual orientation and gender identity. In November 2018, the Micronesian Congress passed C.B. 20-258, which updated the country's anti-discrimination law to include sexual orientation. The bill, introduced by Speaker Wesley Simina, was supported by three of the four states (Chuuk, Pohnpei, and Yap, but opposed by Kosrae).

Section 107 of Chapter 1 of the Code of the Federated States of Micronesia reads:

Section 107. Discrimination on account of race, sex, sexual orientation, language, or religion; Equal protection.

No law shall be enacted which discriminates against any person on account of race, sex, sexual orientation, language, or religion, nor shall the equal protection of the laws be denied.

== Gender identity and expression ==
Micronesia does not provide any administrative or legal procedures allowing transgender people to have their identified gender recognised in official documents.

According to 2017 estimates from UNAIDS, about 4.2% of the Micronesian transgender population was HIV-positive.

== Military service ==
Currently, there is no active military for the Federated States of Micronesia, though should such a need arise, the United States is responsible for its defense per mutual agreement.

== Living conditions ==
=== History ===
In 1989, an anthropologist recorded a case of a young girl on the island of Pohnpei named Maria who exhibited the habits of a boy and would go walking about at night looking for girls. Family and neighbors held a meeting to discuss the matter, and decided to hold a feast where they would publicly name her a boy. His hair was cut and he was presented with male clothing, and finally was renamed Mario.

The islands of Chuuk have an indigenous term that refers to a traditional third gender alongside male and female: wininmwáán.

In December 2018, the country's first pride event and parade took place in the state of Pohnpei.

=== Societal opinions ===
Micronesian society tends to be conservative and the LGBTQ community remains discreet in general. Open displays of affection between same-sex partners may offend. Debates and discussions surrounding LGBTQ rights tend to be "well off the radar".

The Human Truth Foundation has listed Micronesia at rank 90 for LGBTQ rights. This was similar to other Pacific nations, such as Palau (86), Nauru (87) and the Marshall Islands (88).

In 2006, an evangelical pastor from The Salvation Army serving as a pastor in Micronesia decried homophobia and conversion therapy and stated his belief that sexual orientation was predetermined.

== Statistics ==
According to 2017 estimates from UNAIDS, there were about 340 men who have sex with men (MSM) in the country.

== Summary table ==
Same-sex sexual activity legal	Yes
Equal age of consent	Yes
Anti-discrimination laws in employment only	Yes (Since 2018)
Anti-discrimination laws in the provision of goods and services	Yes (Since 2018)
Anti-discrimination laws in all other areas (Incl. indirect discrimination, hate speech)	Yes (Since 2018)
Same-sex marriages	No
Recognition of same-sex couples	No
Stepchild adoption by same-sex couples	No
Joint adoption by same-sex couples	No
LGBTQ people allowed to serve openly in the military	Has no military
Right to change legal gender	No
Access to IVF for lesbians	No
Commercial surrogacy for gay male couples	No
MSMs allowed to donate blood	No

== See also ==
- Human rights in the Federated States of Micronesia
- LGBT rights in Oceania
