= Human rights in South Ossetia =

South Ossetia is a partially recognised landlocked state, approximately 1,000 metres (3,300 ft) above sea level on the slopes of the Greater Caucasus. Although it declared independence in 2008, only a few countries (such as Russia) acknowledge it. The region is inhabited by Ossetians, an Iranian ethnic group. According to Russia, Nicaragua, Venezuela, and Syria, it is one of the world's newest independent states. All other states and international organisations consider South Ossetia a part of Georgia, functioning as a de facto state for twenty years after declaring independence and conducting a successful armed rebellion. Its Georgian inhabitants have been displaced. South Ossetia has been a source of tension for a number of years, with Georgia and Russia's political differences impeding peaceful independence and breeding a turbulent series of events which undermine the Universal Declaration of Human Rights.

== History ==
During the 13th century, the Ossetians are believed to have moved into the region of South Ossetia. They were related to the nomadic Alans; osiderives from Georgian. Alanic tribes in the North Caucasus formed a kingdom knows as Alania during the ninth century, which was bordered by Arabs and the Byzantine Empire. Although the mountains were a natural defence, Alania was destroyed by the Mongols in 1222-1240. In 1239, the capital of Alania was destroyed by the Mongols. Up to 200,000 Alans died, and almost the entire plain of Alania was occupied by the Mongols. The remaining Alans fled further into the Caucasus Mountains and settled in South Ossetia, which were part of the Kingdom of Georgia. The political climate deteriorated, opening the door to Russian annexation.

=== Russian occupation ===
A peasant uprising began in South Ossetia in 1918, which was forcefully suppressed by a Georgian Menshevik force led by Jaliko Jugheli. A Russian force crossed the border and attacked the Georgian army and guard, provoking further violence. Amid heavy casualties, thousands of Ossetians fled to Soviet Russia. Many villages were burnt, and previously fertile land was destroyed. The relationship between the Georgians and the Ossetians deteriorated between 1918 and 1920, with the Georgian government accusing the Ossetians of allying with the Bolsheviks. Riots, rebellions and battles killed thousands of people, in addition to deaths from starvation and disease. Menshevik Georgia introduced its constitution in early 1921, with no mention of autonomous districts and related legislation. On 25 February 1921, the Red Army entered Georgia and established Bolshevik rule.

=== Georgian oblast ===
The Red Army invasion ended the Democratic Republic of Georgia. North and South Ossetia were incorporated by the Soviet Union as separate regions. North Ossetia was an oblast of the Russian Soviet Federative Socialist Republic from 1924 to 1936, and became an autonomous republic within the RSFSR in 1936. South Ossetia was an oblast of the Georgian Soviet Socialist Republic. Although Russian and Georgian were official languages, the Ossetians were permitted to use their language (including in schools). Several unsuccessful attempts were made during the 1920s to unify North and South Ossetia, and Georgia's intention to control both regions was rejected.

=== 1990s unrest ===
The communist South Ossetian authorities declared sovereignty on 20 September 1990 as part of the USSR. Tensions increased, with ethnic Georgians believing that they were being dispossessed. Georgian president Zviad Gamsakhurdia removed South Ossetian autonomy, declaring a state of emergency which intensified South Ossetian demands for unification with North Ossetia. The strained relations bred a rapid increase in nationalist militias. Georgian police entered Tskhinvali (the South Ossetian capital) on 5 January 1991, beginning the 1991–1992 South Ossetia War. War crimes were committed by both sides; over 250 people were killed, and at least 485 were wounded. During the war Georgian paramilitary groups committed acts of violence against Ossetian civilians within South Ossetia that were motivated by the desire to expel Ossetians and reclaim villages for Georgia, and by sheer revenge against the Ossetian people. Between 60 and 100 villages were burned down, destroyed by Georgian forces or otherwise abandoned. Several villages were ethnically cleansed by Georgian forces. On the other side, Georgians living in Ossetian controlled territory were "easy targets": Houses occupied by Georgians were singled out, looted and burned down.

Russian forces have significant control over South Ossetian territory; the penetration of Russian border guards into Georgian territory undermines human rights and raises national-security concerns about the Baku–Supsa Pipeline. The Organization for Security and Co-operation in Europe (OSCE) aims to restrict Russia's role in Transcaucasia, referring to events in South Ossetia as "ethnic cleansing and mass expulsion of the Kartvelian (Georgian) people and communities".

== Progress ==
After the 2008 war, the EU, OSCE and UN co-chaired the Geneva International Discussions (GID). The talks, involving Georgia, Russia Abkhazia, South Ossetia and the United States, addressed non-violent solutions in the region (despite Russia's heavy military presence) and the return of internally displaced persons.

The European Union Monitoring Mission in Georgia (EUMM) has been in operation since the end of 2008. The mission monitors the Georgian, Russian and South Ossetian borders daily, documents any troop movements, and engages with the community to assess potential insurgency in the region. South Ossetia has prohibited the EUMM, however, from entering their territory.

== Related reading ==
- "Georgia: Avoiding War in South Ossetia" (PDF). International Crisis Group. 26 November 2004. Archived (PDF) from the original on 2007-06-30.
- Tishkov, Valery (September 1999). "Ethnic Conflicts in the Former USSR: The Use and Misuse of Typologies and Data". Journal of Peace Research. 36 (5): 571–591. doi:10.1177/0022343399036005005. ISSN 0022-3433. JSTOR 424534. S2CID 143552896.
- Sorenson, Adam (2016-09-22). "South Ossetia and Russia: the treaty, the takeover, the future". North Carolina Journal of International Law. 42.
- Zverev, Alexei. "Ethnic Conflicts in the Caucasus 1988–1994". In Coppieters, Bruno (ed.). Contested Borders in the Caucasus. Archived from the original on 2012-11-29.
- Vashakmadze, Mindia. "Foreign Forces in Georgia: Status, Legitimacy, Prospects". After Shevardnadze: Georgian Security Sector Governance After the Rose Revolution.
- Amnesty International. 2008. Civilians in the Line of Fire: The Georgia-Russia Conflict. London: Amnesty International, November 18.
- Broers, Laurence 2008 Filling the void: ethnic politics and nationalities policy in post-conflict Georgia, in Nationalities Papers 36.2, 275–304
- Zürcher, Cristoph (2007). The Post-Soviet Wars: Rebellion, Ethnic Conflict, and Nationhood in the Caucasus. New York: New York University Press.
