= LGBTQ rights in the Marshall Islands =

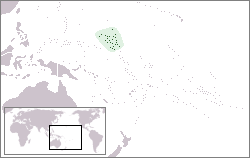
- Marshall Islands
- Legal status: Legal since 2005
- Gender identity: No
- Military: Has no military
- Discrimination protections: Protections for sexual orientation and gender identity

Family rights
- Recognition of relationships: No
- Adoption: No

Lesbian, gay, bisexual, transgender and queer (LGBTQ) people in the Marshall Islands may face legal challenges not experienced by non-LGBTQ residents. Same-sex sexual activity has been legal in the Marshall Islands since 2005 and discrimination on the basis of sexual orientation and gender identity has been outlawed in all areas since 2019. Despite this, households headed by same-sex couples are not eligible for the same legal protections available to opposite-sex married couples, as same-sex marriage and civil unions are not recognized.

The Human Truth Foundation has listed the Marshall Islands at rank 88 for LGBTQ rights. This was similar to other Pacific nations, such as Palau (86), Nauru (87) and Micronesia (90).

In 2011, the Marshall Islands signed the "joint statement on ending acts of violence and related human rights violations based on sexual orientation and gender identity" at the United Nations, condemning violence and discrimination against LGBTQ people.

== Law regarding same-sex sexual activity ==
Same-sex sexual activity has been legal since 2005. The age of consent is equal at 16, regardless of sex and sexual orientation.

== Recognition of same-sex relationships ==
The Marshall Islands does not recognize same-sex marriages or civil unions. Same-sex couples lack legal recognition.

The Births, Deaths and Marriages Registration Act 1988 does not expressly prohibit same-sex marriages, however, section 428(1) assumes the parties to be of the opposite sex, "the male at the time of contracting the marriage be not less than eighteen (18) years of age and the female be not less than sixteen (16) years of age". Marriages may be performed by a registrar, an ordained minister of church, or a judge of the High Court or District Court, and must be registered by the registrar of the atoll.

While the Constitution or statutory law prohibits discrimination on various grounds including sexual orientation (rō rej kalok an itok limoier kōn kōra ak emmaan), marital status (rimare ke jaab) and family status (ej baamle ke jaab), it is unknown if this would therefore guarantee same-sex couples the right to marry. The Supreme Court has yet to rule on the matter.

== Discrimination protections ==
Until 2019, there were no legal protections against discrimination based on sexual orientation or gender identity in employment or the provision of goods and services. Despite a lack of anti-discrimination protections, there had been no known reports of societal discrimination directed against LGBTQ people.

The Code of Judicial Conduct 2008 states that "a judge shall not, in the performance of judicial duties, by words or conduct, manifest bias or prejudice, or engage in harassment, including but not limited to bias, prejudice, or harassment based upon gender, race, language, religion, political or other opinion, national or social origin, place of birth, family status or descent, ethnicity, disability, age, sexual orientation, marital status, socioeconomic status, or political affiliation, and shall not permit court staff, court officials, or others subject to the judge's direction and control to do so." Furthermore, "a judge shall require lawyers in proceedings before the court to refrain from manifesting bias or prejudice, or engaging in harassment, based upon attributes including but not limited to gender, race, language, religion, political or other opinion, national or social origin, place of birth, family status or descent, ethnicity, disability, age, sexual orientation, marital status, socioeconomic status, or political affiliation, against parties, witnesses, lawyers, or others."

In 2016, the Marshall Islands received recommendations from Germany and Israel to prohibit discrimination on the basis of sexual orientation and gender identity.

The Gender Equality Act 2019 prohibits discrimination, whether direct or indirect, in all areas, "in particular in the political, legal, economic, employment, social and domestic spheres" on account of gender, age, ethnicity, disability, marital status, HIV or health status, migrant status, religion, sexual orientation or gender identity. The Act requires the Marshallese Government to adopt measures to eliminate "stereotypes, prejudice, and harmful practices" on the basis of sexual orientation and gender identity, and establishes a program to sensitive judicial and law enforcement officiers and other public officials.

== Living conditions ==
The Marshall Islands has a very limited gay scene. As of 2025, the only known openly LGBTQ organization in the country is the Brighten the Rainbow project formed by Anfernee Nenol Kaminaga, a climate activist. However, debates and discussions surrounding LGBTQ rights tend to be "well off the radar".

The largest religious community in the Marshall Islands is the United Church of Christ, whose American denomination permits same-sex marriage and holds liberal views on LGBTQ rights.

With regards to HIV/AIDS, the infection rate is very low. The Ministry of Health has included HIV/AIDS among its local health education programs, and public health clinics offer free testing.

The Marshall Islands is home to a cultural "third gender" community, known in Marshallese as kakōļ. The term refers to men who "assume women's roles". Unlike many of their third gender counterparts in Oceania, such as the fa'afafine of Samoa or the fakaleiti of Tonga, the kakōļ typically do not cross-dress or identity as women. Instead, most kakōļ prefer to reveal their identity by wearing one item of women's clothing. They are thought to incorporate the strengths of both sexes, and thus serve an important role balancing the worlds of men and women. Kakōļ tend to have romantic relationships with typically masculine heterosexual men. The term jera refers to close relationships between people of the same sex, though not necessarily romantic or sexual. These relationships, also known as "male bonding", appear to be valued by the Marshallese.

== Statistics ==
A 2006 youth survey indicated that 4.3% of male youth in the Marshall Islands had had sex with a male partner sometime in their lives.

According to 2017 estimates from UNAIDS, there were about 150 men who have sex with men (MSM) in the country, and about 100 transgender people.

== Summary table ==
Same-sex sexual activity legal	Yes (Since 2005)
Equal age of consent	Yes (Since 2005)
Anti-discrimination laws in employment only	Yes (Since 2019)
Anti-discrimination laws in the provision of goods and services	Yes (Since 2019)
Anti-discrimination laws in all other areas (Incl. indirect discrimination, hate speech)	Yes (Since 2019)
Same-sex marriages	No
Recognition of same-sex couples	No
Stepchild adoption by same-sex couples	No
Joint adoption by same-sex couples	No
LGBTQ people allowed to serve openly in the military	Has no military
Right to change legal gender	No
Access to IVF for lesbians	No
Commercial surrogacy for gay male couples	No
MSMs allowed to donate blood	No

== See also ==
- Human rights in the Marshall Islands
- LGBTQ rights in Oceania
