= LGBTQ rights in Asia =

- Legal status: Legal, with an equal age of consent, in 29 out of 50 states Legal, with an equal age of consent, in 7 territories
- Gender identity: Legal in 23 out of 50 states Legal in 1 territory
- Military: Allowed in 9 out of 50 states Allowed in 2 territories
- Discrimination protections: Protected in 14 out of 50 states Protected in 4 territories

Family rights
- Recognition of relationships: Recognized in 5 out of 50 states Recognized in 4 territories
- Restrictions: Same-sex marriage constitutionally banned in 5 out of 50 states
- Adoption: Legal in 2 out of 50 states

Laws governing lesbian, gay, bisexual, transgender, and queer (LGBTQ) rights are complex in Asia, and acceptance of LGBTQ people varies. Same-sex behavior is illegal in 21 Asian countries. The behavior is punishable by death in Afghanistan, Brunei, Iran, Qatar, Saudi Arabia, the United Arab Emirates and Yemen. Same-sex behavior is also punishable by imprisonment in 14 other Asian countries, such as Iraq, Kuwait, Malaysia, Oman and Syria. In addition, LGBT people also face extrajudicial executions from non-state actors such as the Islamic State of Iraq and the Levant and Hamas in the Gaza Strip. While egalitarian relationships have become more frequent in recent years, they remain rare.

Historical discrimination towards homosexuality in much of the region include the ban on homosexual acts enforced by Genghis Khan in the Mongol Empire, which made male homosexuality punishable by death. The Fatawa-e-Alamgiri of the Mughal Empire (descended from the Mongol Empire) mandated a common set of punishments for homosexuality, which could include 50 lashes for a slave, 100 for a free infidel, or death by stoning for a Muslim, whereas the Yuan Dynasty (descended from the Mongol Empire) implemented a crackdown on homosexuality in China that was continued by the Ming Dynasty.

Many Asian countries, including Russia, have collectivist cultures, wherein aggression is generally accepted by society if it is used to protect the family honor. Homosexuality is generally considered to be dishonorable, so homophobic aggression in the name of protecting family honor is common.

The three Asian jurisdictions which nationally recognize same-sex marriage include Nepal, Taiwan, and Thailand. In 2019, a survey by The Economist found 45% of respondents in the Asia-Pacific believed that same-sex marriage is inevitable in the region, while 31% of respondents disagreed. Furthermore, three-quarters of those surveyed reported a more open climate for LGBT rights compared to three years ago. Of those reporting an improving climate for LGBT people, 38% cited a change in policies or laws. Meanwhile, 36% said coverage of LGBT issues in mainstream media was a major factor. The top reasons cited for diminishing openness was anti-LGBT advocacy by religious institutions.

Laws regarding homosexuality in Asia Same-sex sexual activity legal Marriage performed Marriage recognized Other type of partnership Unregistered cohabitation No recognition of same-sex couples Restricted or ambiguous Restriction on freedom of expression, not enforced Severe restriction of association with arrests or detention Same-sex sexual activity illegal Prison, not enforced Prison Death penalty on books, not enforced Enforced death penalty

== Legislation by country or territory ==
=== North Asia ===
LGBT rights in:	Same-sex sexual activity	Recognition of same-sex unions	Same-sex marriage	Adoption by same-sex couples	LGBT people allowed to serve openly in military?	Anti-discrimination laws concerning sexual orientation	Laws concerning gender identity/expression
Russia (Including occupied territories such as Crimea)	Yes Yes Fully legal nationwide since 1993 (de-facto illegal and punishment up to death in Chechnya)	No No	No No Constitution limits marriage to opposite-sex couples since 2020	No No	Yes Yes	No No	No No Gender change has not been legal since 2023

=== Central Asia ===
LGBT rights in:	Same-sex sexual activity	Recognition of same-sex unions	Same-sex marriage	Adoption by same-sex couples	LGBT people allowed to serve openly in military?	Anti-discrimination laws concerning sexual orientation	Laws concerning gender identity/expression
Kazakhstan	Yes Yes Legal since 1998	No No	No No	No No	Yes Yes Since 2022	No No	Yes Yes
Kyrgyzstan	Yes Yes Legal since 1998	No No	No No Constitutional ban since 2016	No No	Ambiguous	No No	Yes Yes Requires sex reassignment surgery
Tajikistan	Yes Yes Legal since 1998	No No	No No	No No	Ambiguous	No No	Yes Yes Requires sex reassignment surgery
Turkmenistan	No No Male illegal since 1927; Penalty: up to 2 years imprisonment. Yes Yes Female always legal	No No	No No	No No	No No	No No	No No
Uzbekistan	No No Male illegal since 1926; Penalty: up to 3 years imprisonment. Yes Yes Female always legal	No No	No No Constitutional ban since 2023.	No No	No No	No No	No No

=== West Asia ===
LGBT rights in:	Same-sex sexual activity	Recognition of same-sex unions	Same-sex marriage	Adoption by same-sex couples	LGBT people allowed to serve openly in military?	Anti-discrimination laws concerning sexual orientation	Laws concerning gender identity/expression
Abkhazia (Disputed territory)	Yes Yes Legal	No No	No No	No No	Ambiguous	No No	Ambiguous
Akrotiri and Dhekelia (Overseas Territory of the United Kingdom)	Yes Yes Legal since 2000 + UN decl. sign.	Yes Yes Civil partnerships since 2005	Yes Yes Legal since 2014	Ambiguous	Yes Yes UK responsible for defence	Yes Yes Bans some anti-gay discrimination	Ambiguous
Armenia	Yes Yes Legal since 2003 + UN decl. sign.	No No	No No Constitutional ban since 2015	No No LGBT individuals may adopt, but not same-sex couples.	No No	No No	No No
Azerbaijan	Yes Yes Legal since 2000	No No	No No	No No	No No	No No	No No
Bahrain	Yes Yes Legal since 1976	No No	No No	No No	No No	No No	Yes Yes Transgender people allowed to change legal gender, but only after sex reassignment surgery.
Cyprus	Yes Yes Legal since 1998 + UN decl. sign.	Yes Yes Civil cohabitation since 2015	No No	No No	Yes Yes	Yes Yes Bans some anti-gay discrimination	Yes Yes Forbids some discrimination based on gender identity. No No Gender change is not legal.
(Georgia (country)) Georgia	Yes Yes Legal since 2000 + UN decl. sign.	No No	No No Constitutional ban since 2018	No No	Ambiguous	Yes Yes Bans all anti-gay discrimination	No No
Iran	No No No Illegal; Penalty: 74 lashes for immature men and death penalty for mature men (although there are documented cases of minors executed because of their sexual orientation). For women, 100 lashes for women of mature sound mind and if consenting. Death penalty offense after fourth conviction.	No No	No No	No No	No No	No No	Yes Yes Sex reassignment surgery has been permitted since 1987.
Iraq	No No Re-criminalized in 2024. Penalty: Prison sentence between 10 and 15 years.	No No	No No	No No	No No	No No	No No
Israel	Yes Yes Legal since 1963 (de facto), 1988 (de jure) + UN decl. sign.	Yes Yes Unregistered cohabitation since 1994.	No No/ Yes Yes Foreign same-sex marriages are recognized and recorded in the population registry	Yes Yes Permitted by law since 2008. But in practice gay couples were put at the end of the queue for adoption, until the Supreme Court forbade this discrimination in 2023. Legal adoptions by gay couples began in practice in 2025.	Yes Yes Since 1993; Includes transgender people	Yes Yes Bans all anti-gay discrimination	Yes Yes Full recognition of gender's ID with or without a surgery or medical intervention; equal employment opportunity law bars discrimination based on gender identity
Jordan	Yes Yes Legal	No No	No No	No No	Ambiguous	No No	Yes Yes Allowed since 2014
Kuwait	No No Male illegal; Penalty: Fines or up to 6-year prison sentence.; Yes Yes Female always legal	No No	No No	No No	No No	No No	No No
Lebanon	Ambiguous Ambiguous. Illegal under Article 534 of the Penal Code. Some judges have ruled not to prosecute individuals based on the law, however, this has not been settled by the Supreme Court and thus homosexuality is still illegal. However, a 2017 court ruling claims that it is legal, but the law against it is still in place. Penalty: Up to 1 year imprisonment (unenforced).	No No	No No	No No	No No	No No	Yes Yes Legal gender change allowed, but sex reassignment surgery required
Northern Cyprus (Disputed territory)	Yes Yes Legal since 2014	No No	No No	No No	No No	Yes Yes Bans all anti-gay discrimination	Yes Yes Legal, requires surgery for change
Oman	No No Illegal; Penalty: Fines and prison sentence up to 3 years (only enforced when dealing with "public scandal").	No No	No No	No No	No No	No No	No No Laws against forms of gender expression.
Palestine	West Bank: Yes Yes Legal Gaza: No consensus on legal applicability of British 1936 Sexual offences provisions to homosexual conduct	West Bank: No No; Gaza: No No	No No	No No (can only be done by a single individual, not couples)	(Palestine does not have a military)	Yes (but in employment only in some contexts) but in regard to provision of goods and services or in all other areas (incl. indirect discrimination, hate speech)	No No right to change legal gender but and gender-affirming care was restricted previously to intersex people, not available due to destruction from Gaza war
Qatar	No No No Illegal; Penalty: Fines, up to 7 years imprisonment Death penalty for Muslims.	No No	No No	No No	No No	No No	No No
Saudi Arabia	No No No Illegal; Penalty: Capital punishment, prison terms (indeterminate length, max. term unknown), flogging, fines, deportation	No No	No No	No No	No No	No No	No No Laws against forms of gender expression.
South Ossetia (Disputed territory)	Yes Yes Legal	No No	No No	No No	Ambiguous	No No	Ambiguous
Syria	No No Illegal since 1949; Penalty: Up to 3 years imprisonment.	No No	No No	No No	No No	No No	No No
Turkey	Yes Yes Legal since 1858	No No	No No	No No LGBT individuals may adopt, but not same-sex couples.	No No	No No	Yes Yes Requires sterilisation and sex reassignment surgery for change
United Arab Emirates	No No Illegal; Penalty: Maximum: Capital punishment Minimum: Lashings, imprisonment and fines	No No	No No	No No	No No	No No	No No Sex reassignment surgery severely restricted to limited circumstances (mainly physical intersex traits), highly regulated by the state. Laws used against forms of gender expression.
Yemen	No No No Illegal (codified in 1994); Penalty: Unmarried men punished with 100 lashes of the whip or a maximum of one year of imprisonment, stoning for adultery is not enforced. Women punished up to three years of imprisonment.	No No	No No	No No	No No	No No	No No

=== South Asia ===
LGBT rights in:	Same-sex sexual activity	Recognition of same-sex unions	Same-sex marriage	Adoption by same-sex couples	LGBT people allowed to serve openly in military?	Anti-discrimination laws concerning sexual orientation	Laws concerning gender identity/expression
Afghanistan	No No No Illegal; Penalty: Death penalty	No No	No No	No No	No No	No No	No No
Bangladesh	No No Illegal since 1862; Penalty: 10 years to life imprisonment (Occasionally enforced).	No No	No No	No No	No No	No No	Yes Yes A third gender option (hijra) besides male and female is available for a certain sect of third genders
Bhutan	Yes Yes Legal until 2004, again since 2021	No No	No No	No No	No No	Yes Yes Bans some anti-gay discrimination	Yes Yes Transgender people allowed to change legal gender without surgery
British Indian Ocean Territory (Overseas Territory of the United Kingdom)	Yes Yes Legal since 2001 + UN decl. sign.	Yes Yes Civil partnerships since 2005	Yes Yes Legal since 2014	Ambiguous	Yes Yes UK responsible for defense	Ambiguous	Ambiguous
India	Yes Yes Legal since 2009–2013, again since 2018	No No	No No	No No	No No	Yes Yes Bans some anti-gay discrimination	Yes Yes A third gender option (hijra) besides male and female is available; transgender people have a constitutional right to change gender, only after medical/surgical intervention
Maldives	No No Illegal (codified in 2014); Penalty: Up to 8 years imprisonment, house arrest, lashings and fines. (unenforced) LGBTQ welcomed in tourist islands.	No No	No No	No No	No No	No No	No No
Nepal	Yes Yes Legal since 2007 + UN decl. sign.	Yes Yes Since 2026	Yes Since 2026	No No	Yes Yes Since 2007	Yes Yes Constitutional protections since 2015	No No Change to third gender "O" legal since 2007, unable to change to male or female
Pakistan	No No Illegal since 1862; Penalty: 2 years to life sentence (Occasionally enforced).	No No	No No	No No	No No	Yes Yes Transphobia illegal No No Homophobia/biphobia is not illegal	Yes Yes Right to change gender; transgender and intersex citizens have legal protections from all discrimination and harassment
Sri Lanka	No No Illegal since 1885; Penalty: Up to 10 years imprisonment with fines. (Ruled unenforceable by the Supreme Court) Legalization proposed	No No	No No	No No	No No	Yes Yes Bans some anti-gay discrimination	Yes Yes Transgender people allowed to change legal gender without surgery

=== East Asia ===
LGBT rights in:	Same-sex sexual activity	Recognition of relationships	Same-sex marriage	Adoption by same-sex couples	LGBT people allowed to serve openly in military?	Anti-discrimination laws concerning sexual orientation	Laws concerning gender identity/expression
China	Yes Yes Legal since 1997	No No	No No	No No	Yes Yes can openly serve No No open displays of affection	Yes Yes Court has in some cases protected LGBT workers from employment discrimination. No No protection codified in law	Yes Yes legal gender change possible since 2002. Since 2022, legal gender change allowed with only partial sex reassignment surgery. Difficulty remains to change gender information on diplomas and degrees.
Hong Kong	Yes Yes Legal since 1991	No No/ Yes Yes Same-sex marriages registered overseas for government benefits and taxation, and limited recognition of local cohabiting partners	No No	Yes Yes/ No No Stepchild adoption since 2021	The central government of China is responsible for the defense of Hong Kong.	Yes Yes Bans some anti-gay discrimination (government discrimination only)	Yes Yes Following a legal decision, may change gender marker after partial sex reassignment surgery.
Japan	Yes Yes Legal since 1882 + UN decl. sign.	No No * Symbolic recognition in some jurisdictions.	No No Proposed in 2023. Adult adoption is practiced as an alternative.	No No	Yes Yes The Japan Self-Defense Forces allows gay people to enlist.	No No nationwide protections Yes Yes some cities ban some anti-gay discrimination	Yes Yes Transgender people allowed to change legal gender, but only after sex reassignment surgery
Macau	Yes Yes Legal since 1996	No No	No No	No No	The central government of China is responsible for the defence of Macau.	Yes Yes Bans some anti-gay discrimination	Ambiguous
Mongolia	Yes Yes Legal since 1993 + UN decl. sign.	No No	No No Constitutional ban since 1992	No No	Yes Yes (Only LGB)	Yes Yes Bans all anti-gay discrimination	Yes Yes Transgender people allowed to change legal gender but only after sex reassignment surgery
North Korea	Yes Yes Legal	No No	No No	No No	Yes Yes can serve with 10-year celibacy required for all soldiers. No No open displays of LGBT attitudes.	No No	No No
South Korea	Yes Yes Legal + UN decl. sign.	No No	No No Proposed in 2023	No No	No No	No No nationwide protections Yes Yes Protection from discrimination varies by jurisdiction in some areas, including Seoul	Yes Yes Transgender people allowed to change legal gender but usually requires sex reassignment surgery
Taiwan	Yes Yes Legal		Legal since 2019	Yes Yes Stepchild adoption since 2019; Yes Yes Joint adoption legal since 2023	Yes Yes	Yes Yes Constitutionally bans all anti-gay discrimination from government; several laws banning anti-gay discrimination regarding education and employment.	Yes Yes Transgender people allowed to change legal gender, but only after sex reassignment surgery. (Note: In Taiwan, gender change is not explicitly stated in any law; instead it is permitted by an executive order published by the Ministry of the Interior, which dictates that sex reassignment surgeries are required before gender change. In 2021 a judgement by the Taipei High Administrative Court ruled that the executive order above was unconstitutional and therefore the defendant (district household registration office) must allow the plaintiff to change their gender. The judgement was finalized since the defendant did not appeal. However, since rulings in Taiwan are generally not precedential, said judgement only applies to the plaintiff and does not bind other cases nor the executive branch.)

=== Southeast Asia ===
LGBT rights in	Same-sex sexual activity	Recognition of relationships	Same-sex marriage	Adoption by same-sex couples	LGBT people allowed to serve openly in military?	Anti-discrimination laws concerning sexual orientation	Laws concerning gender identity/expression
Brunei	No No No Illegal since 1908; Penalty: Death by stoning (in abeyance, de jure), 7 year imprisonment and 100 lashes for men (de facto). Caning and 10 years prison for women.	No No	No No	No No	No No	No No	Laws prohibit forms of gender expression.
Cambodia	Yes Yes Legal	No No/ Yes Yes Partnerships recognized in certain cities	No No Constitutional ban since 1993	No No	Ambiguous	No No	No No
Indonesia	Ambiguous Not criminalized in private relationship. Illegal under morality laws and Aceh; Penalty: Up to 1.5 years imprisonment	No No	No No	No No LGBT individuals may adopt, but not same-sex couples	No No Not explicitly prohibited by Law (de jure), Illegal (de facto)	Ambiguous Circular letter bans hate speech based on sexual orientation but enforcement inconsistent and discrimination still active.	Yes Yes Transgender people allowed to change legal gender, but only after sex reassignment surgery.
Laos	Yes Yes Legal	No No	No No	No No	Ambiguous	No No/ Yes Limited Bans some anti-gay discrimination	Ambiguous
Malaysia	No No; Federal criminal law: Illegal since 1871, up to 20 years imprisonment and caning for anal sex (male/male or male/female); Uncertain for lesbian sex. (Note: There are no provision that specifically criminalise lesbian sex under Malaysia's federal criminal law, and there is no known case of lesbian being charged for lesbian sex under Section 377D of the Penal Code. See LGBTQ rights in Malaysia § Federal criminal law for details.) No No; State shariah law: Gay sex or lesbian sex, or both, are illegal for Muslims in all states and federal territories, except in Pahang. (Note: See LGBTQ rights in Malaysia § State Shariah law for details. Some state shariah law criminalising same-sex intercourse have also been nullified by the Federal Court of Malaysia due to conflicts with federal law and the Malaysian Constitution.)	No No	No No	No No LGBT individuals may adopt, but not same-sex couples	No No	No No	No No Generally impossible to change gender. Gender changes was briefly recognized as fundamental rights in a 2014 court ruling, but was overturned by the apex court in 2015. Forms of gender expression are criminalized for Muslims under state shariah law.
Myanmar	No No Illegal since 1886; Penalty: Up to 10 years in prison (unenforced).	No No	No No	No No	No No	No No/ Yes Limited Bans some anti-gay discrimination	No No
Philippines	Yes Yes Legal + UN decl. sign. (Note: Except for the settlements Marawi and M'lang.)	No No (Pending)	No No (Pending)	No No LGBT individuals may adopt, but not same-sex couples	Yes Yes Since 2009	Yes Yes/ No No Bans some anti-gay discrimination in certain cities and provinces, including the City of Manila,Cebu City, Quezon City, and Davao City; Nationwide anti-bullying law for basic education students.	No No Generally impossible to change legal gender. However in Cagandahan vs Philippines, allowed an intersex man to change his legal gender from female to male.
Singapore	Yes Yes Legal since 2007 (de facto), 2022 (de jure)	No No	No No	Ambiguous, a gay Singaporean man with a male partner in 2018 won an appeal in court to adopt a child that he fathered through a surrogate.	Yes Yes	Yes Yes Protections against anti-gay discrimination, harassment and violence	Yes Yes Transgender people allowed to change legal gender, but only after sex reassignment surgery
Thailand	Yes Yes Legal since 1956 + UN decl. sign.	Yes Yes Since 2025	Yes Yes Since 2025	Yes Yes Since 2025	Yes Yes Since 2005	Yes Yes Bans all anti-gay discrimination	No No Yes Yes Anti-discrimination protections for gender expression.
Timor-Leste	Yes Yes Legal since 1975 + UN decl. sign.	No No	No No	Yes Yes LGBT individuals may adopt but same-sex couples can not adopt	Ambiguous	Yes Yes Bans some anti gay discrimination, Hate crime protections since 2009.	Ambiguous
Vietnam	Yes Yes Legal + UN decl. sign.	No No	No No	No No LGBT individuals may adopt, not same-sex couples	Yes Yes Irrespective of one's sexual orientation	Yes Yes Bans some anti-gay discrimination	Yes Yes Gender changes recognized and officially practised since 2017

== Public opinion ==
Indicates the country/territory has legalized same-sex marriage nationwide
Indicates that same-sex marriage rights are pending
Indicates that the country has civil unions or registered partnerships
Indicates that same-sex sexual activity is illegal

Opinion polls for same-sex marriage by country
Country or territory	Pollster	Year	For	Against	Neutral (Note: Also comprises: Don't know; No answer; Other; Refused.)	Margin of error	Source
Armenia	Pew Research Center	2015	3%	96%	1%	±3%	
Cambodia	Pew Research Center	2023	57%	42%	1%		
China	Ipsos	2021	43%	19%		-	
(Georgia (country)) Georgia	Women’s Initiatives Supporting Group	2021	10% (12%)	75% (88%)	15%		
Hong Kong	Pew Research Center	2023	58%	40%	2%		
India	Pew Research Center	2023	53%	43%	4%	±3.6%	
Indonesia	Pew Research Center	2023	5%	92%	3%	±3.6%	
Israel	Pew Research Center	2023	36%	56%	8%	±3.6%	
Japan	Kyodo News	2023	64% (72%)	25% (28%)	11%		
Japan	Asahi Shimbun	2023	72% (80%)	18% (20%)	10%		
Japan	Ipsos	2023	38%	40% [31% support some rights]	22% not sure	±3.5%	
Japan	Pew Research Center	2023	68%	26%	6%	±2.75%	
Kazakhstan	Pew Research Center	2016	7%	89%	4%	-	
Malaysia	Pew Research Center	2023	17%	82%	1%		
Philippines	SWS	2018	22%	61%	16%		
Russia	Ipsos	2021	17%	52%		-	
Singapore	Ipsos	2023	32%	50% [23% support some rights]	19%	±3.5%	
Singapore	Pew Research Center	2023	45%	51%	4%		
South Korea	Ipsos	2023	35%	42% [18% support some rights]	23% not sure	±3.5%	
South Korea	Pew Research Center	2023	41%	56%	3%		
Sri Lanka	Pew Research Center	2023	23%	69%	8%		
Taiwan	CNA	2023	63%	37%			
Taiwan	Pew Research Center	2023	45%	43%	12%		
Thailand	Ipsos	2023	55%	29% [18% support some rights]	16% not sure	±3.5%	
Thailand	Pew Research Center	2023	60%	32%	8%		
Turkey	Ipsos	2023	20%	52% [22% support some rights]	28% not sure	±3.5% (Note: [+ more urban/educated than representative])	
Vietnam	Pew Research Center	2023	65%	30%	5%		

== See also ==
- Recognition of same-sex unions in Asia
- Human rights in Asia
- Over the Rainbow (organization)
- LGBTQ rights by country or territory
- LGBTQ rights in Europe
- LGBTQ rights in the Americas
- LGBTQ rights in Oceania
- LGBTQ rights in Africa
