= LGBTQ rights in the Middle East =

LGBTQ rights in West Asia
- Same-sex marriage done abroad recognized Civil unions, same-sex marriage done abroad recognized Homosexuality is legal Prison unenforced Punishable by prison Death penalty unenforced Enforced death penalty
- Legal status: Legal in: Israel, Turkey, Egypt (de jure), Jordan, West Bank, Lebanon (de facto), Cyprus, Northern Cyprus, Bahrain (de jure), Kuwait (for females); Illegal in: Egypt (de facto), Gaza Strip, Iran, Iraq, Lebanon (de jure), Saudi Arabia, Syria, Qatar, Oman, United Arab Emirates, Yemen, Kuwait (for males)

Lesbian, gay, bisexual, transgender, and queer (LGBTQ) people generally have limited or highly restrictive rights in most parts of West Asia, and are openly subjected to hostility in others. Same-sex behavior is punishable by imprisonment in five of the 18 countries in the region. It is also punishable by death in five of these 18 countries. The rights and freedoms of LGBTQ citizens are strongly influenced by the prevailing cultural traditions and religious mores of people living in the region – particularly Islam.

All same-sex activity is legal in Bahrain, Cyprus, Northern Cyprus, Israel, the West Bank and Turkey. In Lebanon, various courts have ruled that the law criminalizing sexual acts which "contradict the laws of nature" cannot be used to arrest LGBT people.

All same-sex activity is illegal and punishable by imprisonment in Iraq, Oman, Syria and the Gaza Strip. In Kuwait, only male homosexuality is illegal. In Egypt, while no specific law criminalizing same-sex sexual acts exists, various morality provisions are used to enforce a de facto ban. Homosexuality is punishable by death in Iran, Saudi Arabia, Qatar, the United Arab Emirates and Yemen.

It is possible to legally change your gender in seven West Asian territories: Cyprus, Northern Cyprus, Israel, Turkey, Bahrain, Lebanon and Iran.

The right to change your gender is only unrestricted in Cyprus. In Israel, a medical diagnosis is needed and Northern Cyprus, Turkey, Bahrain and Iran require sex reassignment surgery. In Lebanon, legal gender recognition is "granted individually by the presiding magistrate, with unclear requirements". In Egypt, in 2024, a 1994 law permitting transgender and intersex people to legally change their gender was amended to exclude trans individuals.

Sex reassignment surgery is explicitly illegal in Jordan and the United Arab Emirates. Non-normative gender expression is criminalized in Oman, punishable by a fine and/or imprisonment. Trans people have also been subject to persecution under "cross-dressing" laws in Jordan, Lebanon, Saudi Arabia, and the United Arab Emirates; as well as under Egypt's morality laws.

== History ==
Evidence of homosexuality in West Asia and North Africa can be traced back at least until the time of Ancient Egypt and Mesopotamia. In ancient Assyria, sex crimes were punished identically whether they were homosexual or heterosexual. An individual faced no punishment for penetrating someone of equal social class, a cult prostitute, or with someone whose gender roles were not considered solidly masculine. In an Akkadian tablet, the Šumma ālu, it states, "If a man copulates with his equal from the rear, he becomes the leader among his peers and brothers". However, homosexual relationships with fellow soldiers, slaves, royal attendants, or those where a social better was submissive or penetrated, were treated as bad omens. A Middle Assyrian Law Codes dating from 1075 BC has a rather harsh law for homosexuality in the military, which reads: "If a man have intercourse with his brother-in-arms, they shall turn him into a eunuch."

Around 250 BC, during the Parthian Empire, the Zoroastrian text Vendidad was written. It contains provisions that are part of sexual code promoting procreative sexuality that is interpreted to prohibit same-sex intercourse as sinful. Ancient commentary on this passage suggests that those engaging in sodomy could be killed without permission from a high priest. However, a strong homosexual tradition in Iran is attested to by Greek historians from the 5th century onward, and so the prohibition apparently had little effect on Iranian attitudes or sexual behavior outside the ranks of devout Zoroastrians in rural eastern Iran.

The Quran narrates the story of the "people of Lot" destroyed by the wrath of God because the men engaged in lustful carnal acts between themselves. Within the Quran, it never states that homosexuality is punishable by death, and modern historians conclude that the Islamic prophet Muhammad never forbade homosexual relationships, although he shared contempt towards them alongside his contemporaries. However, some hadith collections condemn homosexual and transgender acts, prescribing death penalty for both the active and receptive partners who have engaged in male homosexual intercourse.

There is little evidence of homosexual practice in Islamic societies for the first century and a half of the early history of Islam, although male homosexual relationships were known and ridiculed, but not sanctioned, in Arabia.

During the medieval period and the early modern age, West Asian societies saw a flourishing of homo-erotic literature. Shusha Guppy of the Times Higher Education Supplement argued that although it "has long been assumed that the Arab-Islamic societies have always been less tolerant of homosexuality than the West", in "the pre-modern era, Western European travelers were amazed to find Islam 'a sex-positive religion' and men openly expressing their love for young boys in words and gestures."

During the Islamic Golden Age, the Abbasid dynasty is known for being relatively liberal regarding homosexuality. This is due to a variety of factors, notably the move towards a more bureaucratic Islamic rule and away from literalist adherence to the scripture.

Many Islamic rulers were known to engage in, or at least tolerate, homosexual activity. For instance, Umayyad Caliph Al-Walid II was said to enjoy "al-talawut", an Arabic word for sex with other men. Abu Nuwas, one of the most prominent Arab poets to extensively produce homoerotic works, did so under the tutelage and protection of Harun al-Rashid. Harun al-Rashid's successor, Al-Amin, rejected women and concubines, preferring eunuchs instead.

Homosexual acts are forbidden in traditional Islamic jurisprudence and are liable to different punishments, including the death penalty, depending on the situation and legal school. However, homosexual relationships were generally tolerated in pre-modern Islamic societies, and historical records suggest that these laws were invoked infrequently, mainly in cases of rape or other "exceptionally blatant infringement on public morals". Public attitudes toward homosexuality in the Muslim world underwent a marked negative change starting from the 19th century through the gradual spread of Islamic fundamentalist movements such as Salafism and Wahhabism, and the influence of the sexual notions and restrictive norms prevalent in Europe at the time: a number of Muslim-majority countries have retained criminal penalties for homosexual acts enacted under European colonial rule. In the 19th and early 20th century, homosexual activity was relatively common in West Asia and North Africa, owing in part to widespread sex segregation, which made heterosexual encounters outside marriage more difficult. Georg Klauda writes that "Countless writers and artists such as André Gide, Oscar Wilde, Edward M. Forster, and Jean Genet made pilgrimages in the 19th and 20th centuries from homophobic Europe to Algeria, Morocco, Egypt, and various other Arab countries, where homosexual sex was not only met without any discrimination or subcultural ghettoization whatsoever, but rather, additionally as a result of rigid segregation of the sexes, seemed to be available on every corner." Homosexuality was outlawed in 1943 in Lebanon, to conform to the rule of the Vichy regime of France. The law is known as article 543 in the country's Penal Code. In Iran, men could be intimate with other men without being in a formal relationship. Young men without facial hair were considered beautiful and older men would pursue them. It was not until the nineteenth century, when Europeans began to visit Iran, that the view of homosexual male relationships became negative. European men claimed the relations between Iranian men were immoral. This European perspective was widely adopted by Iranian society. This outlook on queerness within West Asia and North Africa has worsened as totalitarian governments, beginning in the 1970s, came to power and justified their values on Islamic fundamentalism.

Transgender people have also faced backlash in West Asia and North Africa in the late 1900s. There was fear that because one could not differentiate men and women based on their outer appearance, it would cause instability within society. Gender-affirming surgeries were introduced and became accessible and prevalent among transgender women in Iran. In 1976, the Medical Council of Iran outlawed gender reassignment surgery after seeing the increase of procedures among transgender women. They have changed this ruling since then.

Before globalization, West Asian men and women who had homosexual relations did not consider themselves to be 'homosexual'. Due to exchanges between Western Europe and West Asia, the idea of "homosexuality" was introduced to the region and these people were then encouraged to associate themselves with new labels, such as "gay", "lesbian", "straight", and more. Before the use of these labels, people did not categorize their sexuality in that way.

== West Asia today ==
In Iran, Saudi Arabia, Qatar, and Yemen, the laws state that if a person is found guilty of engaging in same-sex sexual behavior, the death penalty would be applied. According to Country Reports of the US Department of State, in Saudi Arabia there are no established LGBTQ organizations. Furthermore, reports of official and social discrimination on the grounds of sexual orientation remains unclear because of strong social pressure not to discuss LGBTQ matters. Iran legally allows sex change, but non-binary people are not recognized.

Jordan and Bahrain are the only Arab countries where homosexuality is legal; some West Asian nations have some tolerance and legal protections for transsexual and transgender people. For example, the Iranian government has approved sex change operations under medical approval. The Syrian government has approved similar operations back in 2011.

LGBTQ rights movements have existed in West Asian nations, including Turkey and Lebanon. However, in both Turkey and Lebanon, changes have been slow and recent crackdown on LGBTQ oriented events have raised concerns about the freedom of association and expression of LGBTQ people and organizations. Lebanon is considerably more tolerant of homosexuality than neighboring countries.

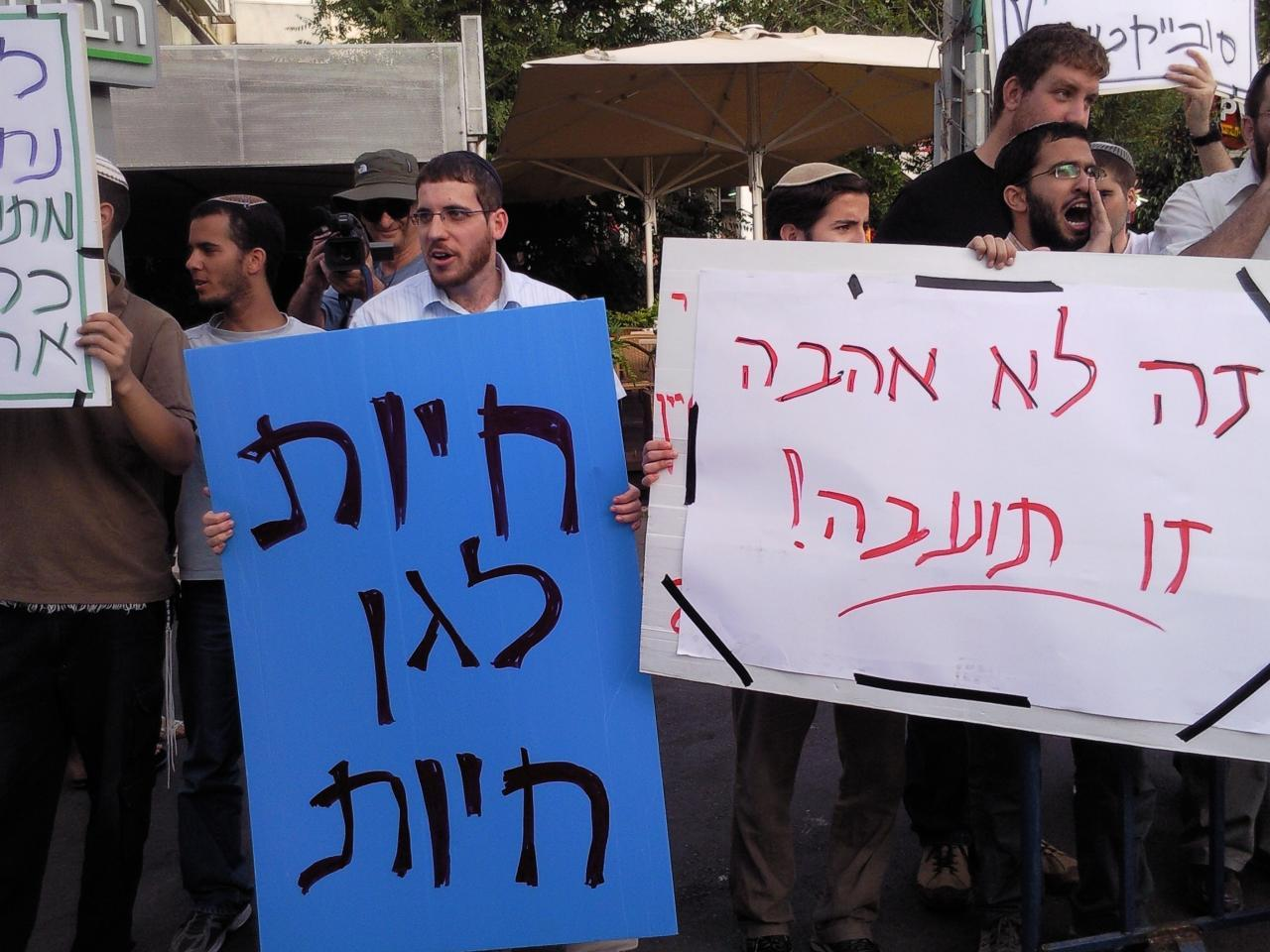
Orthodox Jewish protesters holding Anti-LGBT Protest signs during the Gay Pride parade in Haifa, Israel (2010)

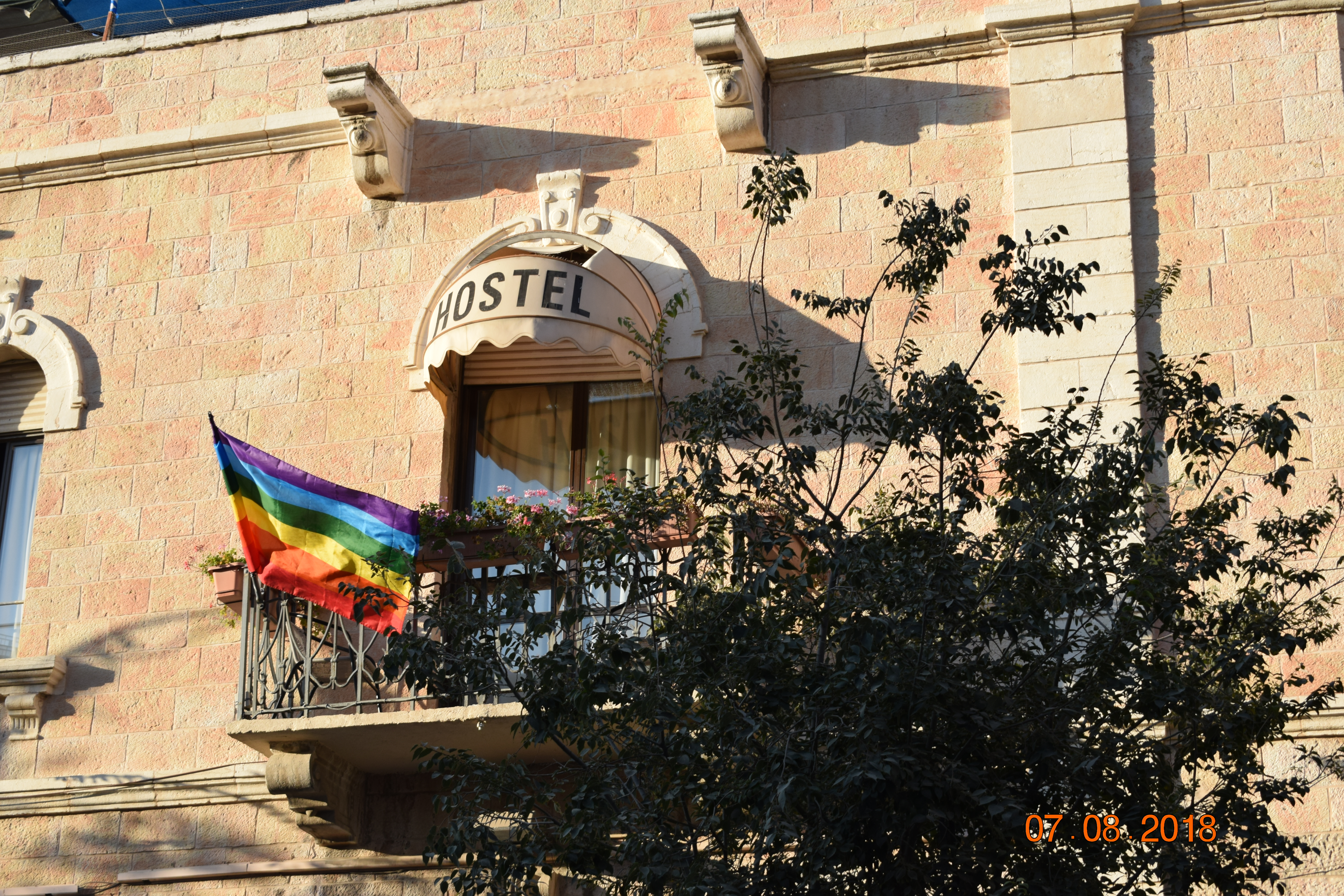
Image of Gay Pride flag in Jerusalem

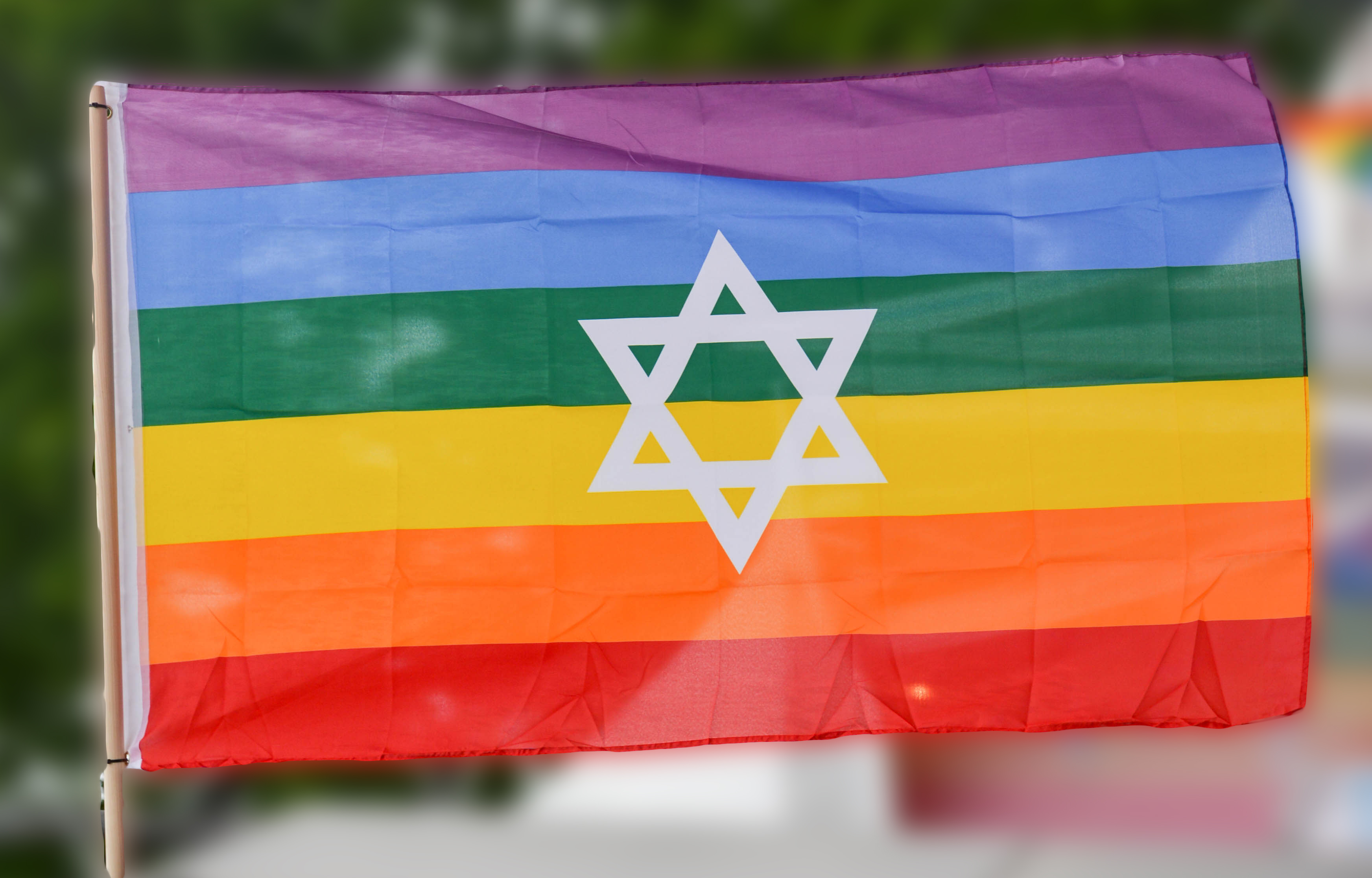
Image of a Gay Pride flag and the Star of David combined.

Israel is a notable exception, being the most supportive towards LGBTQ rights and recognizing unregistered cohabitation. Israel also allows transgender individuals to legally change their gender without surgery. Transgender individuals can serve openly in the Israel Defense Forces.

There are different legal systems in Palestine. On 18 September 1936, the criminal code of Mandatory Palestine, British Mandate Criminal Code, which drew from Ottoman law or English law, was enacted. Section 152(1)(b)(c) of the code states that any person who "commits an act of sodomy with any person against his will by the use of force or threats" or "commits an act of sodomy with a child under the age of sixteen years" is liable for imprisonment up to 14 years, while Section 152(2)(b) states that anyone who has "carnal knowledge" of anyone acting "against the law of nature" is liable for a prison term up to 10 years. Palestinian academic Sa'ed Atshan argued that this criminal code was an example of British export of homophobia to the Global South. The present applicability of this law is disputed. The Human Dignity Trust states that the criminal code is still "in operation" in Gaza albeit with scarce evidence of its enforcement, while Amnesty International does not report same-sex sexual activity as being illegal in any Palestinian territory, but emphasizes that Palestinian authorities do not stop, prevent or investigate homophobic and transphobic threats and attacks. The editor-in-chief of the Palestinian Yearbook of International Law, Anis. F. Kassim argued that the criminal code could be "interpreted as allowing homosexuality."

The decriminalization of homosexuality in Palestine is a patchwork. On the one hand, the British Mandate Criminal Code was in force in Jordan until 1951, with the Jordanian Penal Code having "no prohibition on sexual acts between persons of the same sex," which applied to the West Bank, while Israel stopped using the code in 1977. On the other, the Palestinian Authority has not legislated either for or against homosexuality. Legalistically, the confused legal legacy of foreign occupation — Ottoman, British, Jordanian, Egyptian and Israeli — continues to determine the erratic application or non-application of the criminal law to same-sex activity and gender variance in each of the territories. A correction issued by the Associated Press in August 2015 stated that homosexuality is not banned, by law in the Gaza Strip or West Bank, but is "largely taboo", and added "there are no laws specifically banning homosexual acts".

Arab and Muslim views of homosexuality as a purely "Western" creation have been explored in the film Dangerous Living: Coming Out in the Developing World. The starting line of the dialogue spoken by an as yet unseen gay Egyptian man stating "I was accused of being Westernized."

A 2009 Human Rights Watch report on LGBTQ rights notes in its West Asia and North Africa section:

In a few places, like Egypt and Morocco, sexual orientation and gender identity issues have begun to enter the agendas of some mainstream human rights movements. Now, unlike in earlier years, there are lawyers to defend people when they are arrested, and voices to speak up in the press. These vital developments were not won through identity politics. Those have misfired disastrously as a way of claiming rights in much of the North Africa and West Asia; the urge of some western LGBT activists to unearth and foster "gay" politics in the region is potentially deeply counterproductive. Rather, the mainstreaming was won largely by framing the situations of LGBT (or otherwise-identified) people in terms of the rights violations, and protections, that existing human rights movements understand.

— Human Rights Watch 2009, p. 18

Although many West Asian and North African countries have penal codes against homosexual acts, these are seldom enforced due to the difficulty to prove unless caught in the act. In West Asia today many countries still do not have codification of homosexuality or queerness as an identification of sexual orientation.

In Iran there is a strict gender binary. The government enforces the gender binary by suppressing information about homosexuality and encouraging people questioning their sexuality to undergo sex reassignment surgery. Since the sex reassignment surgery is accepted by the government and religious institutions along with obtaining funding from the government for the surgery many Iranians who are attracted to the same sex see this as a way to be public about their sexual orientation without being persecuted by the government. Since being homosexual is not an option presented to Iranians, there has been a surge in the number of Iranians who undergo gender reassignment surgery when their sexual orientation is towards the same sex. Sex reassignment surgery is encouraged by clerics, psychologists, and the government as homosexuality is illegal and punishable by imprisonment, lashing or execution. This has led to a bolstering transgender community in Iran as homosexuality has been removed from society as an identity leading homosexuals and transsexuals to all seek gender reassignment surgery. The people who undergo these surgeries are fully accepted by the government but families still often reject family members who undergo sex reassignment surgery. Family members are a primary resource for job acquisition in Iran. Without a social network to call on for job leads it is increasingly difficult to find work, and transsexuals are discriminated against in the job market forcing them into sex work.

Qatar, however, has modified the LGBTQ laws in the wake of 2022 FIFA World Cup tournament. Homosexuality is a criminal offence in Qatar, yet the Arab nation stated that LGBTQ fans would be welcome to the biggest sports event. In May 2022, the Emir of Qatar Sheikh Tamim bin Hamad al-Thani stated "everyone is welcome" to attend the FIFA World Cup 2022 event in Qatar, including the LGBTQ fans. "We will not stop anybody from coming and enjoying the football. But I also want everybody to come and understand and enjoy our culture. We welcome everybody, but also we expect and we want people to respect our culture", he said.

Qatar aimed to host the FIFA World Cup tournament in a welcoming and safe manner with the football fans and LGBTQ+ fans. According to Numbeo Crime Index by Country 2022, out of 142 surveyed nations, Qatar has maintained its position as the 'Safest Country' in the world. Although the European teams competing at the 2022 Qatar World Cup walked back their plans to wear OneLove armbands in support of LGBTQ rights during the tournament, following warnings from international soccer governing body FIFA that they would be penalized for doing so.

The Ministry of Education in UAE approved a code of conduct that prohibits education professionals from discussing "gender identity, homosexuality or any other behavior deemed unacceptable to the UAE's society" in their respective classes. A majority of education professionals working at the Emirati institutions are foreign nationals employed as English language teachers. The ruling could affect a majority of its recipients in the Gulf state.

== Regional LGBTQ organizations and solidarity groups ==
Listed below are a few ally organizations that aim to help and support LGBTQ people in West Asia and North Africa. Other organizations with the same goal exist as well; however, these are the organizations that have made the most impact in the regions thus far.

=== Rainbow Street ===
Rainbow Street is a non-governmental organization (NGO) that is determined to help LGBTQ people in West Asia and North Africa region by providing support to those who experience systemic oppression and persecution due to their gender identity and/or sexual orientation. The organization aims to provide queer and trans people with the necessary resources needed to ensure they have access to safe, discrete and capable providers.

=== OutRight Action International ===
OutRight is a NGO that promotes human rights of LGBTQ people around the world, including in West Asia. The organization focuses more on Iraq, Iran, and Turkey, but also partners with other groups in the region in order to listen to local LGBTQ activists, and advocate on their behalf at the United Nations. The partnerships include organizations in Algeria, Egypt, Jordan, Libya, Morocco, Kuwait, Oman and Lebanon. The organization works with these groups on "different topics through capacity building, advocacy, research and holistic security." The largest project that they have is in Iran which is focused on assistance to the LGBTQ community in Iran. In order to counter prejudiced views in the media, provide necessary legal and religious frameworks that promote tolerance and in an effort to make their research accessible OutRight Action International created a wide range of resources in Persian.

OutRight has a significant program in the organization called LBQ Connect which aims provide for support for "lesbian, bisexual and queer activism around the world." Due to the marginalization of women who identify as queer, bisexual or lesbian as well as trans and nonbinary people, the organization centers these people in their framework in effort to provide support and resources. OutRight seeks to challenge prejudice, violence and discrimination experienced by those who identify as LGBTQ throughout the world and providing these individuals with training and monetary resources to strengthen their skills and improve research. The research conducted influences changes in the LBQ program and overall advocacy agenda of the organization.

=== Helem ===
Helem (Arabic: حلم) is an NGO based in Lebanon, established in the 2000s, that has the main goal of annulling article 534 in Lebanon's Penal Code which punishes "unnatural sexual intercourse", particularly sexual relations involve anal sex. The organization was the first of its kind within the Arab World. Helem is an acronym for Himaya Lubnaniya lil Mithliyeen wal Mithliyat, which translates to "Lebanese protection for gays and lesbians". The acronym itself means "dream". The Penal Code is most commonly used to target people that do not conform to society's gender binary system. Individuals who express gender non-conformity are punished not only through the Penal Code but also in the interest of maintaining public morality. Helem's other goals include making Lebanese society more aware about the AIDS epidemic and other sexually transmitted diseases in the country and advocating for the rights of Lebanese LGBTQ individuals. Helem also allows allies to access membership to the organization. Although Helem was started to address the rights of the LGBTQ Community, it has incorporated social work into the organization's mission. The organization advocates for marginalized communities throughout Lebanon and the Arab World. Helem seeks to "work not only on issues related to identity and civil/political rights, but also prioritize social and economic rights by leveraging law, development, and community mobilization as tools for equality and liberation.

The focus on marginalized communities sparked outrage throughout Lebanon when Helem invited people who weren't of Lebanese nationality into the organization during the Cedar Revolution. Helem supports and advocates for domestic workers and refugees, including those who have left their home countries in fear of discrimination due to their sexual orientation. In 2006, Helem joined Samidoun. Helem created an annual event called "international day against homophobia" (IDAHO) and the first event took place in May 2005. The organization has faced scrutiny and obstacles from the government and members of the community whilst trying to carry out their mission. A longstanding belief throughout the community is that Helem is trying to impose Western imperialism and ideals in Lebanon and throughout the Arab World.

=== Majal ===
Majal is an NGO in West Asia and North Africa (MENA) that was established in Bahrain in 2006, and it focuses on "amplifying underrepresented voices". Majal "translates to opportunity or to give away" in Arabic. The organization centers the rights of different marginalized groups throughout West Asia and North Africa, including the LGBTQ community. Majal provides various platforms that focus on distributing information, resources and having community led discussion to highlight the experiences of marginalized groups. Ahwaa is a platform on Majal that provides LGBTQ people in West Asia a digital space to have discussions through game mechanics. The space uses avatars that protect users from disclosing their identities in an effort to reduce discrimination and persecution and to promote conversations regarding gender identity and sexual orientation. When users exhibit positive contributions and are supported by their peers, they gain more access to the platform. This system protects users from individuals that are using the platform to cause harm to others.

== Laws ==
This section is by no means exhaustive, and does not cover every particular law pertaining to LGBTQ rights. This is partly due to the non-existence of these laws in some West Asian and North African countries, and also due to the laws being available in Arabic.

Examples of laws regarding homosexual orientation or transgender/non-binary identity
Country	Homosexuality legal status	Laws regarding same-sex behavior	Laws regarding being transgender or non-binary
Bahrain	/ (de jure)	The penal code does not prohibit private, non-commercial acts of homosexuality between consenting adults, although "adults" for the purposes of that law are at least 21 years old. There are several other parts of the penal code that can be used against LGBTQ people which can result in 15 years in prison with fines. According to the Human Rights Watch, the government of Bahrain has also charged citizens for acts of "indecency" and "immorality".	Legal gender change is permitted but requires surgery. Does not acknowledge any gender identity other than female and male.
Cyprus		Homosexual activities are legal in Cyprus, and civil unions have been legal since December 2015.	Legal gender change is permitted without surgery or medical diagnosis. Does not acknowledge any gender identity other than female and male.
Egypt	Yes	Contemporary Egyptian law explicitly does not criminalize same-sex sexual acts De facto illegal and LGBTQ people can also be charged under morality laws with penalities up to 17 years in prison, fines, and deportation	Law allowing transgender and intersex people to legally change their gender was amended in 2024 to remove trans people. Trans people are targeted under morality laws. Does not acknowledge any gender identity other than female and male.
Iran		Felony –Lesbians, gays and bisexuals in Iran face execution, imprisonment, lashings, fines.	Transgender people are allowed to change their legal gender through a sex reassignment surgery since 1987, which is partially paid for by the government. Does not acknowledge any gender identity other than female and male.
Iraq		Since 2024, same-sex relationships can result in up to 15 years in prison.	No provisions for legal gender change. Does not acknowledge any gender identity other than female and male.
Israel		The law protects LGBTQ individuals; any violent crime motivated by sexual orientation is considered a hate crime.	Legal gender change is permitted with a medical diagnosis. Does not acknowledge any gender identity other than female and male.
Jordan		Jordan does not criminalize consensual adult homosexual intercourse.	Sex reassignment surgery is illegal and trans people are persecuted under "cross-dressing" laws. Does not acknowledge any gender identity other than female and male.
Kuwait		Felony – Men can be sentenced to up to seven years of imprisonment under Article 193 of Kuwait's Penal Code for same-sex relations.	Article 198 criminalises "questionable" gender expression. Does not acknowledge any gender identity other than female and male.
Lebanon	/	Under Section 534 of the Lebanese Criminal Code, "any sexual intercourse contrary to the order of nature" is punishable with up to a year in prison. However, this law is rarely enforced. In 2019, it was ruled that homosexuality is not punishable by law. In 2013, Lebanon became the first Arab country to declassify homosexuality as a disease. Conversion therapy is not outlawed, but it is discouraged and unsupported by the government. Various LGBTQ organizations exist in Lebanon. See LGBT rights in Lebanon.	Legal gender change is possible through the courts with proof of "physical, social and psychological nature". A law against men "disguising" as women has been used to target transgender women. Does not acknowledge any gender identity other than female and male.
Oman		Felony – Any sexual act occurring between people of the same sex is punishable with imprisonment, varying from six months to three years, under Article 262 of Oman's latest penal code (promulgated in January 2018).	Does not permit legal gender change. Non-normative gender expression is illegal. Does not acknowledge any gender identity other than female and male.
Palestine	/	The Gaza Strip and the West Bank are governed by different penal codes. There is no consensus as to whether Gaza still follows the 1936 British Mandate Criminal Code Ordinance, with provisions which punish homosexual conduct with prison sentences ranging from 10 to 14 years depending on the offense. The West Bank on the other hand follows the Jordanian Penal Code of 1951, which, as previously stated, does not incriminate same-sex sexual acts.	Both Gaza and the West Bank provide no means to legally change your gender and do not acknowledge any gender identity other than female and male.
Qatar		Felony – inducing or seducing a male or a female anyhow to commit illegal or immoral actions" is punishable by up to three years.	No provisions for legal gender change. Does not acknowledge any gender identity other than female and male.
Saudi Arabia		Saudi Arabia has no written laws but penalizes LGBTQ activity with up to death.	Trans people are persecuted under "cross-dressing" laws. No provisions for legal gender change and does not acknowledge any gender identity other than female and male.
Syria		Article 520 prohibits "unnatural sexual intercourse", those convicted could face up to 3 years in prison.	No provisions for legal gender change. Does not acknowledge any gender identity other than female and male.
Turkey		Same-sex sexual intercourse have been legal in Turkey since 1858 under the Ottoman Empire. While not outright banned, the LGBTQ community has faced increasing challenges since 2014, particularly regarding Istanbul Pride, which had been held for over a decade until it was banned following a police crackdown.	Transgender people have been allowed to change their legal gender since 1988 with surgery. Does not acknowledge any gender identity other than female and male.
United Arab Emirates (UAE)		Under Sharia law, the death penalty is possible but no cases of death penalty sentences are known. In article 407-408, if a person is disgraced, the punishment is up to death. which in the context of the UAE Penal Code, "disgraces" (often translated from the Arabic legal term Hatak Al 'Erd / هتك العرض) refers legally to indecent assault or an act of gross public/private indecency (homosexual activity is considered indecency). Dubai's penal code criminalizes sodomy with up to 10 years in prison. In addition, Abu Dhabi's penal code criminalizes unnatural sex acts with up to 14 years in prison.	Although previously permitted under a 2016 law, gender affirming care for trans people is criminalised under a 2019 decree, which states explicitly that physicians who provide it will be punished. Trans expression is also targeted under cross-dressing laws. Does not acknowledge any gender identity other than female and male.
Yemen		Article 268 of the national penal code prohibits private consensual homosexual acts between adult men.The stipulated punishment in the law for unmarried men is 100 lashes and up to a year in prison. The law stipulates that married men convicted of homosexuality are to be put to death by stoning. Article 268 of the national penal code prohibits private consensual homosexual acts between adult women with a penalty of up to three years in prison.	No provisions for legal gender change. Does not acknowledge any gender identity other than female and male.

== Social context and extrajudicial violence ==
Scholars have noted that historical research on homosexuality in West Asia and North Africa remains limited, with gaps in documentation contributing to incomplete understandings and allowing cultural and religious narratives to play a significant role in shaping public perceptions.

Beyond the sphere of legislative politics, individuals who practice behaviors that can be considered LGBTQ and/or people who directly identify as lesbian, gay, bisexual, trans, or queer often face profound social consequences due to this designation falling outside of the cultural "normal". These consequences can include negative repercussions in one's family life and social marginalization, as well as direct violence and even honor killings. Discrimination towards LGBTQ people is therefore not only a legal matter but a social and cultural phenomenon that must be understood beyond just the letter of the law as it is codified. Due to the power dynamics specific to societies in West Asia and North Africa today, one must therefore look not only to law but also to social norms and cultural practices in order to understand the state of LGBTQ rights in the region. As put by Sabiha Allouche, Senior Teaching Fellow at the University of London SOAS, the traditional "formulation of the legal sphere" throughout the history of queer advocacy in the West is "not necessarily applicable to contexts where penal codes often intertwine with further regulatory systems, including religion, customs, traditions, and kin-based patterns of governance." The elitism and jargon endemic to the NGO-ization of human rights advocacy in the region can actually impede the endeavors of these organization, in that NGO-ization causes the work of local activists to be perceived as systematic colonial intervention from the west.

As happens in Western European and North American nations, interpretations of religious doctrine are commonly used as justifications for violence and exclusion of gay people from society. Christian populations in West Asia and North Africa persecute gay people as well, demonstrating that cultural customs may play a role as much as religion. The centrality of heterosexual family structures to social and religious rituals can also lead to heightened scrutiny from people in one's own family.

Due to the illegality and stigma around people who identify as LGBTQ, there is a dearth in the quantity of credible data collected regarding violence and discrimination that LGBTQ individuals face on a daily basis. However, a report written by Outright International submitted to UNHRC regarding violence and discrimination based on sexual orientation and gender identity in Iraq has found that despite LGBTQ rights being protected by the law, there exists no feasible legal recourse for victims of such hate crimes.

== Censorship ==
=== Films ===
Due to homosexuality laws, many films with LGBTQ characters or themes have been banned in many West Asian and North African countries, especially in the Gulf states. Below are some notable examples.

Film	Year	Banned in	Notes and references
Black Panther: Wakanda Forever	2022	Kuwait (uncut version)	The film was cut for release in Kuwait.
Bros	2022	—	Not officially banned, but was not screened or released in Egypt, Kuwait, Saudi Arabia or the United Arab Emirates.
Doctor Strange in the Multiverse of Madness	2022	Egypt, Kuwait, Qatar and Saudi Arabia	
Eternals	2021	Kuwait, Saudi Arabia and Qatar	
Everything Everywhere All At Once	2022	Kuwait and Saudi Arabia	
Lightyear	2022	Bahrain, Egypt, Iraq, Jordan, Kuwait, Lebanon, Oman, Palestine, Qatar, Saudi Arabia, Syria, Tunisia and the United Arab Emirates	Also banned in several other countries. Despite petitions requesting bans in the remaining Arab nations, countries such as Morocco refused to ban the film and even showed it in cinemas.
Onward	2020	Kuwait, Oman, Qatar and Saudi Arabia	Shown in cinemas elsewhere, including in Bahrain, Egypt and Lebanon.
Thor: Love and Thunder	2022	Bahrain, Iraq, Kuwait, Oman, Qatar and Saudi Arabia	Banned in all Gulf states except the United Arab Emirates. Also banned in Malaysia.
West Side Story	2021	Kuwait and Saudi Arabia	

== Public opinion ==
A survey Pew Research Center conducted in found that over 80% of people polled rejected homosexuality as "morally unacceptable". Those who do identify with the LGBTQ community live in hiding due to the fear of backlash and punishment. While some are comfortable to attend LGBTQ themed events, many will wear masks to cover their identities.

On 22 February 2022, Ubisoft announced to withdraw the Six Invitational 2022 tournament from being held in the UAE, days after its LGBTQ+ personnel, players and fan base protested against the selection of the country for the event. The event was officially moved from the UAE due to the acute criticism of its treatment of lesbian, gay, bisexual and transgender people. The Rainbow Six Siege tournament, a game that features LGBTQ+ characters, is held thrice every year.

=== Acceptance as a practice ===
Is homosexuality an acceptable practice?
Country	Yes (%)	No/unsure/didn't answer (%)
Algeria	26%	74%
Morocco	21%	79%
Sudan	17%	83%
Jordan	7%	93%
Tunisia	7%	93%
Lebanon	6%	94%
Palestine	5%	95%
Source: Arab Barometer (2018–2019)

=== Acceptance by society ===
Should homosexuality be accepted by society?
Country	Yes (%)	No (%)
Israel	47%	45%
Lebanon	13%	85%
Tunisia	9%	72%
Source: Pew Research Center (2020)

Do you support equal rights for the LGBTQ+ Community?
Country	Yes (%)	No (%)
Israel	61%	(not-mentioned)
Source: Camil Fuchs Statistics Center (2023)

=== Acceptance as neighbours ===
Below is a table of attitudes towards homosexuals as neighbours in West Asia and North Africa, according to a World Values Survey from 2017 to 2020.

Would you accept a homosexual neighbour?
Country	Yes (%)	No (%)
Lebanon	52%	48%
Iraq	45%	55%
Tunisia	40%	55%
Egypt	16%	84%
Jordan	6%	94%
Source: World Values Survey (2017–2020)

=== Justifiability ===
Can homosexuality be justified?
Country	Yes (%)	No (%)
Lebanon	2.67%	79%
Iraq	2.08%	56%
Tunisia	0.75%	94%
Jordan	0.58%	95%
Source: World Values Survey (2017–2020)

=== Perceived acceptance ===
Is the city or area you live in a good place for homosexuals?
Country	Yes (%)	No (%)
Israel	38%	49%
Syria	36%	51%
Tunisia	4%	62%
Lebanon	12%	81%
Palestine	6%	80%
Mauritania	5%	91%
Source: Gallup (2013)

Regarding the Jewish society: Should there be full equal rights in Israel for LGBT people?
Country	Yes (%)	No (%)
Israel	77%	16%
Source: The Israeli Institute for Gender and LGBT Studies (2023)

== See also ==
- Sexual taboo in the Middle East
- GCC homosexuality test
- LGBT in Islam
- Homosexuality and Judaism
- Transgender rights in Iran
- Islam and modernity
- Middle East and globalization

LGBTQ rights by country

- LGBT rights in Bahrain
- LGBT rights in Cyprus
- LGBT rights in Egypt
- LGBT rights in Iran
- LGBT rights in Iraq
- LGBT rights in Israel
- LGBT rights in Jordan
- LGBT rights in Kuwait
- LGBT rights in Lebanon
- LGBT rights in Northern Cyprus
- LGBT rights in Oman
- LGBT rights in the State of Palestine
- LGBT rights in Qatar
- LGBT rights in Saudi Arabia
- LGBT rights in Syria
- LGBT rights in Turkey
- LGBT rights in the United Arab Emirates
- LGBT rights in Yemen

== Bibliography ==
- Birdal, Mehmet Sinan (2020). "The State of Being LGBT in the Age of Reaction: Post-2011 Visibility and Repression in the Middle East and North Africa". In Bosia, Michael J.; McEvoy, Sandra M.; Rahman, Momin (eds.). The Oxford Handbook of Global LGBT and Sexual Diversity Politics. Oxford and New York: Oxford University Press. doi:10.1093/oxfordhb/9780190673741.013.16. ISBN 978-0-19-067374-1.
- Khan, Badruddin (1997). "Not-So-Gay Life in Pakistan in the 1980s and 1990s". In Murray, Stephen O.; Roscoe, Will (eds.). Islamic Homosexualities: Culture, History, and Literature. New York and London: NYU Press. pp. 275–296. doi:10.18574/nyu/9780814761083.003.0022. ISBN 978-0-8147-7468-7. JSTOR j.ctt9qfmm4. OCLC 35526232. S2CID 141668547.
- Rahman, Momin (2020). "Queer Muslim Challenges to the Internationalization of LGBT Rights: Decolonizing International Relations Methodology through Intersectionality". In Bosia, Michael J.; McEvoy, Sandra M.; Rahman, Momin (eds.). The Oxford Handbook of Global LGBT and Sexual Diversity Politics. Oxford and New York: Oxford University Press. doi:10.1093/oxfordhb/9780190673741.013.27. ISBN 978-0-19-067374-1.
- Rowson, Everett K. (30 December 2012) [15 December 2004]. "Homosexuality ii. In Islamic Law". Encyclopædia Iranica. Vol. XII/4. New York: Columbia University. pp. 441–445. ISSN 2330-4804. Archived from the original on 17 May 2013.
- Rowson, Everett K. (23 March 2012) [15 December 2004]. "Homosexuality iii. In Persian Literature". Encyclopædia Iranica. Vol. XII/4-5. New York: Columbia University. pp. 445–448, 449–454. ISSN 2330-4804. Archived from the original on 17 May 2013.
