= LGBTQ rights in Oman =

- Oman
- Legal status: Illegal: Islamic Sharia Law is applied. Only enforced in cases of "public scandal".
- Penalty: The punishment for this crime may include a custodial sentence of up to three years, in addition to financial penalties.
- Gender identity: No
- Military: No
- Discrimination protections: None

Family rights
- Recognition of relationships: No recognition of same-sex unions.
- Adoption: No

LGBTQ (Lesbian, Gay, Bisexual, Transgender, and Queer) people in Oman face significant social and legal challenges not experienced by non-LGBTQ residents. Homosexuality in the Sultanate of Oman is illegal. It is clearly stated so in §§ 33 and 223 of the penal code. The punishment for this crime is a prison sentence of up to three years. This law applies to both men and women. The code is clear: "The suspects of homosexual or lesbian" intercourse shall be prosecuted without a prior complaint, if the act results in a public scandal.

== Living conditions ==
In September 2013, it was announced that all Gulf Cooperative Countries had agreed to discuss a proposal to devise a test for homosexuality intended to single out gay foreigners and prevent them from entering any of the countries. However, it has been suggested that concern for hosting 2022 FIFA World Cup in Qatar, and fears for controversy in a case that football fans would have been screened, made officials backtrack the plans and insist that it was a mere proposal.

In 2018, four men who cross-dressed as women in Salalah were arrested and punished. They were imprisoned and fined maximum amounts under laws against "indecent" dress and behaviour.

== LGBTQ rights movement in Oman ==
Like in other Gulf countries, advocacy for LGBTQ rights in Oman is a criminal act; activists use social media with an alias to protect their identities with very rare exceptions.

== Summary table ==
Same-sex sexual activity legal	No (Up to 3 years to life imprisonment and fines, only enforced if public scandal is involved)
Equal age of consent	No
Anti-discrimination laws in employment only	No
Anti-discrimination laws in the provision of goods and services	No
Anti-discrimination laws in all other areas (incl. indirect discrimination, hate speech)	No
Same-sex marriages	No
Recognition of same-sex couples	No
Step-child adoption by same-sex couples	No
Joint adoption by same-sex couples	No
Gays and lesbians allowed to serve openly in the military	No
Conversion therapy banned	No
Right to change legal gender	No Laws against men dressing as women and vice versa.
Access to IVF for lesbians	No
Commercial surrogacy for gay male couples	No
MSMs allowed to donate blood	No

== See also ==
- Human rights in Oman
- LGBTQ rights in Asia
- LGBTQ rights in the Middle East
