= LGBTQ rights in Kuwait =

- Kuwait
- Legal status: Illegal for males (not criminalised between females)
- Penalty: Imprisonment of up to 7 years
- Gender identity: No; crossdressing decriminalised
- Military: No
- Discrimination protections: None

Family rights
- Recognition of relationships: No recognition of same-sex unions
- Adoption: No

Lesbian, gay, bisexual, transgender, and queer (LGBTQ) people in Kuwait face significant challenges not experienced by non-LGBTQ residents. Same-sex sexual activity between men is specifically outlawed and LGBTQ individuals may also be targeted under the public morality laws. LGBTQ persons are regularly prosecuted by the government and additionally face discrimination and stigmatization by officials and amongst the broader population.

== Law ==
Consensual sexual activity between males is illegal under Kuwait's penal code. (Note: Article 191 of the penal code relates to assault or sexual abuse (rather than consensual sex, whether it involves same-sex or opposite-sex sexual activity). It punishes: "Whoever rapes [indecently assaults] a person by force, threat or deception shall be punished by imprisonment for a period not exceeding fifteen years. "If the perpetrator is an ascendant of the victim or one of those responsible for raising or caring for him, or one of those who have authority over him, or was a servant of him or of the aforementioned, the penalty shall be life imprisonment. "The previous penalties shall be imposed if the victim is lacking in will due to his youth, insanity or dementia, or was unaware of the nature of the act, or believed in its legitimacy, even if the act was committed without force, threat or deception." — Article No. 191, Kuwaiti Penal Code (Law No. 16 of 1960 Promulgating the Penal Code [16/1960])) No laws specifically criminalise same-sex sexual activity between women. The relevant law states:

193 المادة رقم

اذا واقع رجل رجلا آخر بلغ الحادية والعشرين وكان ذلك برضائه ، عوقب كل منهما بالحبس مدة لا تجاوز سبع سنوات.

Translation:
Article No. 193

If a man has sexual intercourse with another man who has reached the age of twenty-one and this is with his consent, each of them shall be punished with imprisonment for a period not exceeding seven years.

The penal code also covers "public indecency":

المادة رقم 198

من اتى اشارة او فعلا فاضحا مخلا بالحياء في مكان عام او بحيث يراه او يسمعه من كان في مكان عام ، يعاقب بالحبس مدة لا تجاوز سنة واحدة وبغرامة لا تجاوز الف روبية او باحدى هاتين العقوبتين.

Translation:
Article No. 198

Whoever makes an indecent gesture or act in a public place or in such a way that it can be seen or heard by anyone in a public place, shall be punished with imprisonment for a period not exceeding one year and with a fine not exceeding one thousand rupees or with one of these two penalties.

== Living conditions ==
In September 2013, it was announced that all countries of the Gulf Cooperation Council had agreed to discuss a proposal to establish some form of, as yet unknown, "testing" to detect homosexuality in order to deny entry to gay foreigners. However, it has been suggested that concern for hosting 2022 FIFA World Cup in Qatar, and fears of controversy over the possible screening of football fans, made officials backtrack on the plans and insist that it was a mere proposal.

In 2017 Instagram star King Luxy was arrested in Kuwait for allegedly looking too feminine. He spent two weeks in custody before he was released.

=== Discrimination ===
LGBTQ individuals in Kuwait face significant challenges and discrimination. Same-sex sexual activity between men is explicitly outlawed, with penalties of up to seven years in prison. Although there are no specific laws criminalizing same-sex sexual activity between women, it is still technically illegal due to the inability to consent unless married. Public morality laws are strictly enforced, leading to regular prosecutions and stigmatization. For example, in 2017, Instagram star King Luxy was arrested for allegedly looking too feminine. Additionally, in August 2023, Kuwait banned the movie 'Barbie', claiming it promoted homosexuality. Despite some progress, such as the 2022 Constitutional Court ruling that overturned the criminalization of "imitation of the opposite sex," discrimination remains prevalent.

== HIV/AIDS issues ==
In 1988, the Kuwaiti Ministry of Public Health supported a study investigating the prevalence of unrecognised HIV infection in Kuwait, which found no infections in a sample of Kuwaiti and non-Kuwaiti men. A similar sentinel surveillance study was performed in 1997–1998, again detecting no HIV infection in its sample group. (Note: In the study, participant data recorded included: nationality, marital status and sexual history (heterosexual and homosexual activity; premarital and extramarital sex). Of the 3,123 patients who sought normal (non-HIV) sexually transmitted disease (STD) testing (therefore had been exposed to STD risk) and those undergoing standard premarital examinations, 305 were randomly selected for HIV testing. Travel to 27 different countries in the six months prior to testing was reported amongst the sample. No HIV infection was detected, despite the sample group being considered high-risk. The authors of the second study in 1997–1998, concluded that the country's mandatory HIV screening of foreign nationals applying for residency permits accounted for the absence of infections in the non-Kuwaiti sub-group. The researchers stated they could not be certain if their results were an accurate reflection of the true HIV prevalence in the Kuwaiti community.) The incidence of HIV/AIDS has remained very low within Kuwait, under 0.1 percent over the entire period up to the latest reported figures in 2021. The segment of the population that forms the majority of those with HIV in Kuwait, is males aged between 25 and 49 years, at 47 percent of the total.

Foreigners found to be infected with AIDS/HIV are deported, but Kuwaiti citizens who are infected are entitled to outpatient medical care, organised by a specialized infectious disease hospital.

In 2004 a United Nations report on HIV in Kuwait found that about six percent of known transmission cases were the result of unprotected sexual contact between men.

In 1992, the National Assembly criminalised the intentional transmission of HIV to another person.

== LGBTQ rights movement in Kuwait ==
No known association or charity exists in Kuwait to campaign for LGBTQ rights or to organize educational and social events for the LGBTQ community.

In 2007, the Al Arabiya news service reported that a group of Kuwaitis had applied for a permit to form a new association that would stand up for the rights of LGBTQ Kuwaitis. All such interest groups or clubs have to be approved by the Ministry of Labor and Social Affairs, which never formally replied.

In July 2019 the group announced that they would again apply for a permit from the ministry in response to a crackdown by the Ministry of Commerce on symbols representing homosexuality such as rainbows in shops.

== Summary table ==
Same-sex sexual activity legal	No Up to 7 years in prison for males. Not criminalised for females.
Equal age of consent	No
Anti-discrimination laws in employment only	No
Anti-discrimination laws in the provision of goods and services	No
Anti-discrimination laws in all other areas (incl. indirect discrimination, hate speech)	No
Same-sex marriages	No
Recognition of same-sex couples	No
Step-child adoption by same-sex couples	No Adoption is not legal for anyone in Kuwait.
Joint adoption by same-sex couples	No Adoption is not legal for anyone in Kuwait.
LGBTQ people allowed to serve openly in the military	No
Right to change legal gender	No Gender change is not legal
Gender identity expression	No , although crossdressing has been decriminalised.
Access to IVF for lesbians	No
Commercial surrogacy for gay male couples	No Surrogacy is not allowed for anyone in Kuwait.
MSMs allowed to donate blood	Not specifically outlawed.

== See also ==
- Human rights in Kuwait
- GCC homosexuality test
- LGBTQ rights in the Middle East
- LGBTQ rights in Asia
