= LGBTQ rights in Akrotiri and Dhekelia =

- Location of LGBTQ rights in Akrotiri and Dhekelia (red) in Europe (grey) – [Legend]
- Legal status: Legal since 2000, age of consent equalised in 2003
- Military: Legal since 2000
- Discrimination protections: Yes, sexual orientation protections

Family rights
- Recognition of relationships: Same-sex marriage since 2014
- Adoption: -

Lesbian, gay, bisexual, and transgender (LGBT) persons in the British Overseas Territory of Akrotiri and Dhekelia enjoy most of the same rights as non-LGBT people.

The status of LGBT rights in certain areas is unclear. Same-sex marriage has been legal in the territory since June 2014, under the Overseas Marriage (Armed Forces) Order 2014, but only to British military personnel. In most cases, the laws of Akrotiri and Dhekelia and the United Kingdom do not apply to the c. 7,700 Cypriot civilians. Akrotiri and Dhekelia issues birth and death certificates to civilian residents for instance, but only issues marriage certificates to military personnel and their dependents.

== Law regarding same-sex sexual activity ==
Same-sex sexual activity was legalised in Akrotiri and Dhekelia in 2000, under the Criminal Code (Amendment) Ordinance 2000. In 2003, the age of consent was equalised for same-sex sexual activities.

== Recognition of same-sex relationships ==
Same-sex marriage in Akrotiri and Dhekelia has been legal since 3 June 2014. An ordinance to legalise such marriages was approved by the Queen's Most Excellent Majesty in Council on 28 April 2014 and came into effect on 3 June. However, for a same-sex couple to marry in the territory, at least one partner has to serve in the British Armed Forces and their marriage application has to be approved by the base commander. The first same-sex couple to marry in the territory was Sergeant Alastair Smith and Aaron Weston, who married on the British military base on Dhekelia on 10 September 2016.

Civil partnerships have also been legal for same-sex couples, if at least one partner is serving in the British Armed Forces, since 7 December 2005.

Civilian same-sex couples living in the territory are unable to marry, as they are governed under the laws of Cyprus which does not recognise same-sex marriage. In 1960, when the Republic of Cyprus became independent, the United Kingdom declared that the laws applicable to the civilian population would be as far as possible the same as the laws of Cyprus. In December 2015, civil unions were legalised in Cyprus for both different-sex and same-sex couples.

== Discrimination protections ==
The territory has prohibited discrimination based on sexual orientation in employment since 1 March 2013.

Since 1 February 2016, the local Criminal Code has criminalised incitement to violence or hatred on the ground of sexual orientation. Punishment ranges from 3 years imprisonment to a fine of 5,000 pounds.

== Summary table ==
| | Yes/No |
|---|---|
| Same-sex sexual activity legal | Yes (Since 2000) |
| Equal age of consent | Yes (Since 2003) |
| Anti-discrimination laws in employment only | Yes (Since 2013) |
| Anti-discrimination laws in the provision of goods and services | No |
| Anti-discrimination laws in all other areas (incl. indirect discrimination, hate speech) | Yes (Since 2016) |
| Same-sex marriage | Yes (Since 2014) |
| Recognition of same-sex couples | Yes (Since 2005) |
| Stepchild adoption by same-sex couples | |
| Joint adoption by same-sex couples | |
| Access to IVF for lesbians and automatic parenthood for both spouses after birth | |
| LGBT people allowed to serve openly in the military | Yes (Since 2000) |
| Right to change legal gender | |
| Commercial surrogacy for gay male couples | No (Banned for heterosexual couples as well) |
| MSMs allowed to donate blood | |

== See also ==
- LGBTQ rights in the United Kingdom
- LGBTQ rights in Cyprus
- LGBTQ rights in Northern Cyprus
- LGBTQ rights in Europe
- LGBTQ rights in Asia
- Same-sex marriage in Akrotiri and Dhekelia
