= Capital punishment for homosexuality =

Capital punishment as a criminal punishment for homosexuality has been implemented by a number of countries in their history. It is a legal punishment in several countries and regions, all of which have Islamic-based criminal laws, except for Uganda.

Gay people also face extrajudicial killings by state and non-state actors in some regions of the world. Countries where this is known to occur include Egypt, Iraq, Kenya, Nigeria, Senegal, Turkmenistan, Uganda, Russia, and as a general rule of thumb the vast majority of places where queer people's human rights/civil liberties are restricted by law.

Some people view the imposition of the death penalty for homosexuality as the judicial murder of gay people.

== In current state laws ==
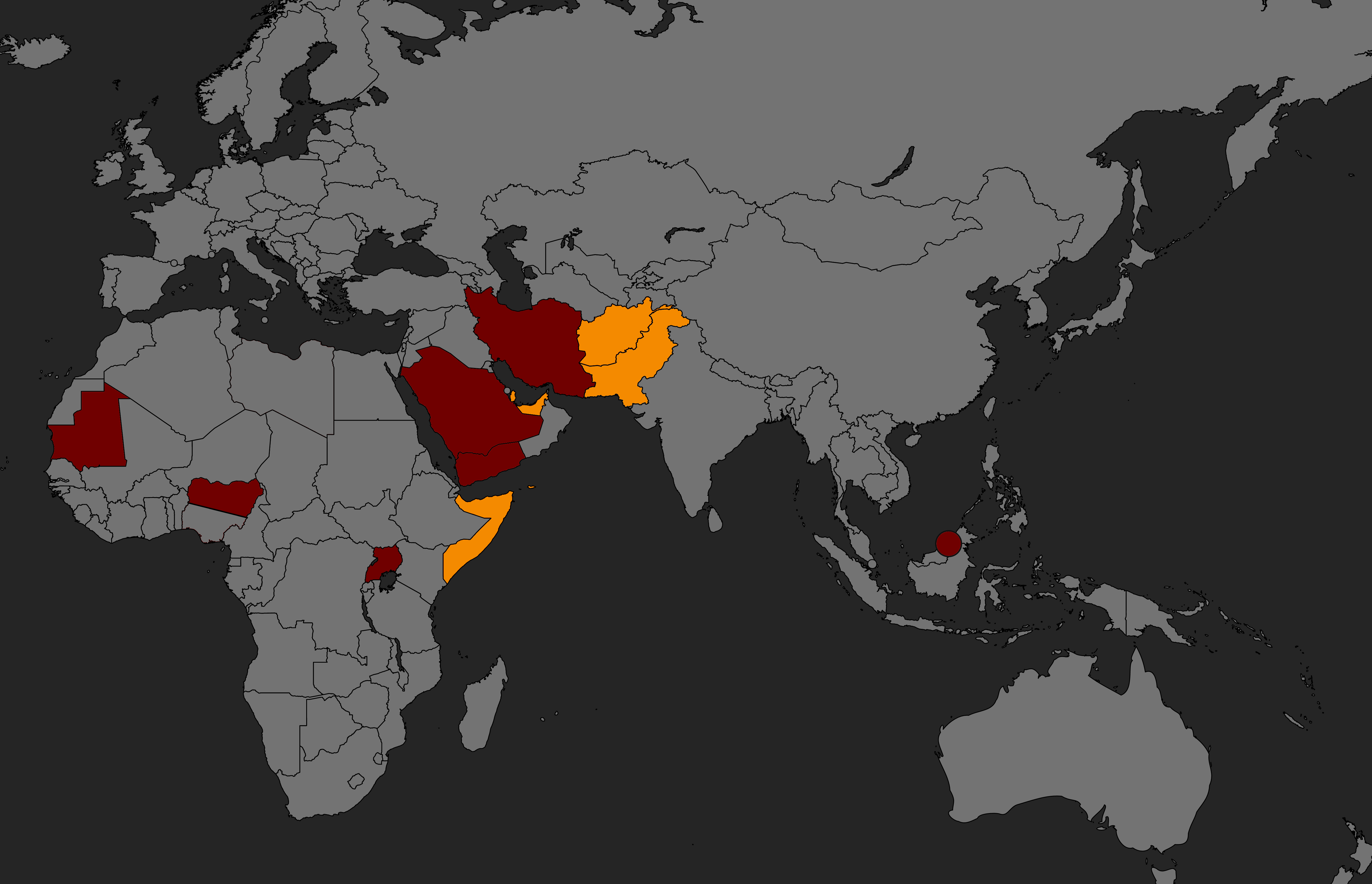
Law explicitly provides for death penalty for sex between consenting adults of the same sex. Law is unclear if death penalty is a legally possible punishment for same-sex acts, although such acts are criminalized. (Note: The ILGA, in its 2020 report and its 2023 database, state that there five UN-member countries where the status of the death penalty as a punishment for same-sex sexual conduct is uncertain. This may be because legal experts or scholars dispute the effect of legal provisions, or because the laws relied upon to potentially sanction the death penalty relate to sexual behaviours outside marriage, with applicability to homosexual relations so far only theoretical. The jurisdictions in this category are: Afghanistan, Pakistan, Qatar, Somalia (including Somaliland) and the United Arab Emirates.)

The International Lesbian, Gay, Bisexual, Trans and Intersex Association (ILGA) reported in 2020 that in at least six UN member states—Brunei, Iran, Mauritania, Nigeria (some states in northern Nigeria), Saudi Arabia, and Yemen—homosexual activity is punishable by death. These six were joined in 2023 by Uganda, which became the only Christian-majority country (82% Christian in 2024) with capital punishment for some consensual same-sex acts. Excepting Uganda, all countries currently having capital punishment as a potential penalty for homosexual activity base those laws on interpretations of Islamic teachings called sharia laws. One source states that in 2007 alone, five countries had carried out executions for homosexuality. In 2020, the ILGA stated that Iran and Saudi Arabia were the only countries in which government-sanctioned executions for consensual same-sex sexual activity had taken place since 2000.

=== Complete legal certainty ===
For the countries listed below, no dispute or uncertainty regarding the legal status of capital punishment as a possible penalty for same-sex sexual conduct exists. While clearly allowable, the application or enforcement of the legally-sanctioned death penalty varies across the jurisdictions, with some not having imposed or enacted the penalty for many years or decades, and some never having done so, while others have carried out executions recently and some do so regularly.

As of May 2023, the following jurisdictions allow the death penalty to be imposed for homosexual conduct:

- Brunei. The Syariah Penal Code Order (Brunei: Syariah, lit. 'sharia') prescribes death by stoning for sex acts between men (in abeyance under a moratorium, which may be lifted without warning at any time), De facto penalty: Seven years in prison and 30 lashes for married men.
- Iran. Male-male anal intercourse is declared a capital offense in Iran's Islamic Penal Code, enacted in 1991. Articles 233 through 241 criminalise both female and male same-sex activity; for a first offence, the death penalty only applies to some cases of male-male penile-anal intercourse, with female-female activity and other cases of male-male activity being punished by flogging instead of execution. Under the combination of articles 136 and 238, a woman convicted for the fourth time of the crime of musaheqeh (tribadism) is to be executed; there is no death penalty for non-genital-genital female-female sexual conduct. Though the grounds for execution in Iran are difficult to track, there is evidence that several gay men were executed in 2005–2006 and 2016 mostly on alleged charges of rape.
- Mauritania. According to a 1983 law, Muslim men can be stoned for engaging in homosexual sex, though no executions have occurred so far. The country has observed a moratorium on the execution of the death penalty since 1987. De facto penalty: Two years in prison and a fine for both men and women.
- Nigeria. Several northern states have adopted sharia-based criminal laws, though no executions are known.
- Saudi Arabia. The kingdom does not have codified criminal laws. According to the country's interpretation of sharia, a married man who commits sodomy, or a non-Muslim who engages in sodomy with a Muslim, can be stoned to death. There are unconfirmed reports that two cross-dressing Pakistani nationals were killed by Saudi authorities in 2017, which Saudi officials have denied. Verified executions occurred in 2019. Homosexuality in Saudi Arabia is proven by four eyewitnesses who have seen the penetration, or a self confession; if these conditions are not met they can not be stoned but can be given discretionary punishments like lashing and imprisonment.
- Uganda. In May 2023, the Anti-Homosexuality Act, 2023 was signed into law, prescribing the death penalty for certain acts of "aggravated homosexuality". These are defined as: those who have homosexual sex with minors, with persons aged over 75 years, persons with disabilities, without or unable to consent, or with a person who is mentally ill. Anyone convicted of homosexuality more than once, or having infected others with a serious infectious disease such as HIV/AIDS, are also liable to be convicted as perpetrators of "aggravated homosexuality". (Note: Before the Act was promulgated, there was a draft version, the Anti-Homosexuality Bill (Bill no. 3 of 2023), that generated international news coverage. Had it passed intact it would have criminalised merely identifying as gay or non-binary, stipulating that "hold[ing] out as a lesbian, gay, transgender, a queer or any other sexual or gender identity that is contrary to the binary categories of male and female" was committing "an offence of homosexuality" and thus liable to the penalty of ten years in prison. This provision, 2(1)(d), was excluded from the Act that was passed and signed into law.)
- Yemen. Punishment for homosexuality in Yemen can originate from the codified penal code, or from people seeking to enforce traditional Islamic morality. Article 264 of the national penal code prohibits private consensual homosexual acts between adult men. The stipulated punishment in the law for unmarried men is 100 lashes and up to a year in prison. The law stipulates that married men convicted of homosexuality are to be put to death by stoning. Article 268 of the national penal code prohibits private consensual homosexual acts between adult women. The law stipulates that premeditated acts of lesbianism are punished with up to three years in prison. In addition to the penal code, punishment for homosexuality can originate from people seeking to enforce traditional morality within their own family or for the broader society. In vigilante cases such as this, the punishment for homosexuality is oftentimes death.

=== Legality unclear ===
According to the ILGA, there are five UN-member countries where the status of the death penalty as a punishment for same-sex sexual conduct is uncertain. This may be because experts or legal scholars dispute the effect of legal provisions, or because the laws relied upon to potentially sanction the death penalty are the zina provisions which relate to all sexual behaviours outside marriage, with applicability to homosexual relations uncertain, and so far, only theoretical.

As of 2020, these jurisdictions are:

- Afghanistan. The Islamic Republic of Afghanistan enacted a Penal Code in February 2018 explicitly criminalising same-sex sexual conduct, stipulating prison sentences as the punishment. While the ILGA wrote that a "high-profile Islamic scholar" has stated there was a "broad consensus amongst scholars that execution was the appropriate punishment if homosexual acts could be proven", this could only be achieved under zina provisions, applicable to all sexual contact outside marriage. The sharia category of zina (illicit sexual intercourse) according to some traditional Islamic legal schools may entail the hadd (sharia-prescribed) punishment of stoning, when strict evidential requirements are met. The Hanafi school, prevalent in Afghanistan, does not regard homosexual acts as a hadd crime, although Afghan judges may have potentially applied the death penalty for a number of reasons. No known death sentences for homosexuality occurred after the end of Taliban rule in 2001. However, following the Taliban takeover of Afghanistan in 2021, fears of reprisal including death for those suspected of homosexuality were renewed. A Taliban spokesman told Reuters in 2021: "LGBT ... That's against our Sharia law". A Taliban judge said that "For homosexuals, there can only be two punishments: either stoning, or he must stand behind a wall that will fall down on him".
- Pakistan. Hudood punishments for homosexuality include execution. However, the Hudood Ordinances have not been enforced "since the 1985 lifting of martial law", according to the U.S. State Department, and there are no known cases of Hudood being applied to same-sex sexual conduct. No known executions for homosexual activity have ever occurred in Pakistan.
- Qatar. Same-sex sexual activity is prohibited under the Penal Code 2004, which criminalises acts of "sodomy" and "sexual intercourse" between people of the same sex. These provisions carry a maximum penalty of seven years' imprisonment. Both men and women are criminalised under this law. The death penalty may be applicable to Muslims, for certain types of extramarital sex regardless of the gender of the participants. However, there is no evidence that the death penalty has been applied for consensual same-sex relations in private taking place between adults.
- Somalia. Insurgents and Somali officials have imposed sharia-based law in several southern states. In territories controlled by al-Shabaab homosexuality is punishable by death.
- United Arab Emirates. On occasion, Sharia courts have gone beyond codified laws and imposed sentences of stoning or flogging for zina crimes, thus theoretically making same-sex sexual activity liable to the death penalty, as occurring outside marriage. While adherence of the country's legal system to sharia allows for capital punishment for same-sex sexual activity— as with other sex acts by married persons outside marriage under zina provisions, there are no known instances of imposition of the death penalty as of 2020, according to the British non-profit Human Dignity Trust, (Note: The Human Dignity Trust wrote in 2020 that all annual human rights reports from the U.S. Department of State on UAE after 2015 stated no prosecutions for same-sex sexual acts had been reported.) the ILGA, the U.S. Department of State, and other organizations.

== Extrajudicial executions ==
In some regions, gay people have been murdered by Islamist militias and terrorist groups, such as Islamic State of Iraq and the Levant in parts of Iraq, Libya, and Syria, the Houthi movement in Yemen, in Malaysia. Reported gay killings by Hamas in the Gaza Strip have been either attributed to a combination of espionage charges and homophobia or debunked as having happened elsewhere (see below). In Sub-Saharan Africa killings have been reported in regions of Africa heavily influenced by conservative Christianity and Islam (see below). In some Christian majority regions, like some areas of Brazil, LGBT people have been consistently murdered due to conservative or religious beliefs (see below).

=== Afghanistan ===
Following the Fall of Kabul in 2021, several international LGBTQ+ organizations like Canada-based Rainbow Railroad reported increased violence against gay men by members of the Taliban and other Islamic extremists, with the victims not being subjected to any trial or legal proceeding, considering that homosexuality is punishable by death in Afghanistan. The reports included testimonies from young gay men who denounced kidnapping, torture, and rape since the Taliban takeover in August 2021.

The most known case since the return of the Taliban has been the murder of Hamed Sabouri, a 22-year-old gay medical student from Kabul who was kidnapped at a Taliban checkpoint and tortured for three days before being shot to death. Sabouri's ordeal was filmed by his captors and sent to his brother Haseeb, who sold the family's properties in Kabul and fled to Turkey. Similarly, Sabouri's boyfriend, a member of an underground and clandestine LGBTQ+ organization in Afghanistan, said that the Taliban was looking for him, calling them "wild animals" for killing his boyfriend.

Taliban spokesman Zabihullah Mujahid denied direct Taliban responsibility in the killing and added that the government had no knowledge of the case.

=== Brazil ===
Brazil is the country with the highest number of fatalities within the LGBTQ community, as stated in 2024 by The Federal Public Defenders’ Office in its input to the Special Rapporteur on extrajudicial, summary or arbitrary execution about the murder of LGBTQIAPN+ individuals in Brasil.

As reported by NGO Grupo Gay da Bahia, 343 LGBT people were murdered in Brazil in 2016, 387 in 2017, and 420 in 2018, 257 in 2023. For 44 years, the GGB has collected data on these killings: "The pattern persists, with transvestites being shot in public places (...) while gays and lesbians are more likely to be stabbed (...) inside their homes" the 2024 report stated.

The Federal Public Defenders’ Office stated that gender and sexuality issues are framed in political discourse as threats to traditional family values, or public safety, often based in moral or religious arguments. A representative of the Trans Studies Magazine and Transmaculinities Brazilian Institute also stated that high violence rates against trans people is part of a political environment “marked by a fundamentalism of heteronormativity”.

=== Chechnya ===
Anti-gay purges in Chechnya, a predominantly Muslim region of Russia, have included forced disappearances—secret abductions, imprisonment, and torture—by local Chechen authorities targeting persons based on their perceived sexual orientation. Of one hundred men, whom authorities detained on suspicion of being gay or bisexual, three have reportedly died after being held in what human rights groups and eyewitnesses have called concentration camps.

=== Iraq ===
Extrajudicial killings have occurred in Iraq. Cases include abductions, torture, rape and murder by vigilante mobs, militia and other perpetrators. LGBTQ people living in fear of their lives, campaigners Human Rights Watch (HRW) and IraQueer found. HRW's LGBTQ rights researcher Rasha Younes said: "LGBT Iraqis live in constant fear of being hunted down and killed by armed groups with impunity, as well as arrest and violence by Iraqi police, making their lives unliveable."

=== Malaysia ===
In Malaysia, extrajudicial murders of LGBTQ people have also occurred. There are no Malaysian laws that protect the LGBTQ persons from discrimination and hate crimes.

=== Sub-Saharan Africa ===
Instances of killings by mobs and vigilantes, family violence, and other abuse from the community towards LGBTQ persons have been reported in regions of Africa heavily influenced by conservative Christianity and Islam. Such incidents have occurred in: Algeria, Uganda, South Africa, Kenya, Liberia, Ghana, Nigeria, Cameroon, and Senegal. In some locations, police may be unlikely to intervene in incidents and are often complicit in reported abuse; they are at times complicit in the anti-gay violence.

=== Palestine ===
Homosexuality is not a capital offence in the Gaza Strip or elsewhere in Palestine. The laws against homosexual behavior in Palestine (Note: Some interpretations of these laws say that it does not outlaw consensual gay sex between adults at all. Anis. F. Kassim – editor-in-chief of the Palestinian Yearbook of International Law – said that the law in question "could be interpreted as allowing homosexuality".) are a relic of the British and Ottoman rule in Palestine; they specify prison sentences of 10 to 14 years. There is no evidence that these British colonial-era laws are actually enforced in Gaza.

Reports of extrajudicial killings of LGBTQ people in Palestine have circulated, without being confirmed. Sources such as the news agency Reuters, the news outlet The New Arab, and the NGO Human Rights Watch, characterise many of these reports as misinformation: the stories are exaggerated, oversimplified, or misattributions of events that occurred elsewhere. Examples of this include:

- Two members of Palestinian nationalist militant groups were accused of espionage and killed by their comrades in situations that included rumours about homosexuality or bisexuality.
- During the Gaza war, a video described as "Hamas executes people by throwing them off a roof of a building!" circulated on social media. Some derivatives of the meme stated the men were executed for being gay. A July 2015 report from Al Arabiya, included identical images and states that they were originally shared by the Islamic State, and showed the execution of four gay men in Fallujah, Iraq.

==== Mahmoud Eshtiwi ====
In February 2016, the Al-Qassam Brigades (the militant wing of the Hamas movement) executed Mahmoud Eshtiwi, the commander of Al-Qassam's Zeitoun Battalion. The alleged offences were described evasively, the stated reason was Arabic: تجاوزاته السلوكية والأخلاقية التي أقر بها, lit. 'for behavioral and moral violations, to which he confessed', which some western news media interpreted as a euphemism for homosexual activity. Hamas accused Eshtiwi of spying for Israel, specifically providing information to Israel which allowed them to locate Mohammed Deif’s house, which was bombed on 19 August 2014 killing his wife and two children but leaving Mohammed alive. The Qassam Brigades alleged that Eshtiwi had been executed by firing squad, but people who saw his body before burial alleged that he might have died in custody and been shot after death.

==== Lions' Den in Nablus ====
The Zuhair Relit (Lions' Den militant group) in Nablus in the West Bank executed one of their members for sharing information with the Israeli security services that led to the assassination of several leaders of the group. The young man had been bribed and blackmailed by Shin Bet allegedly using a video of him having sex with a male partner. But it is unclear how this video became public, it may not have been released by the group themselves.

== Hate crimes ==
Extrajudicial killings of perceived homosexuals occur in the Western world, with varying levels of condoning, inaction, or condemnation from the social environments in which they occur. Levels of anti-LGBTQ crime vary by location; where they have lesser implicit or explicit societal support – from government, influential people or bodies, for example – attacks on LGBTQ people, including murders, are often classified as hate or bias crimes, rather than extrajudicial killings.

=== Homophobic crime in Australia ===
An Australian study, published in 2000 by the Australian Institute of Criminology, found that of the 454 male homicides between 1989 and 1999 in the state of New South Wales, at least 37 were verifiably fuelled by homophobia.

== History ==
=== Australia ===
Australian states and territories first passed laws against homosexuality during the colonial era, and nineteenth-century colonial parliaments retained provisions which made homosexual activity a capital offence until 1861. Most jurisdictions removed capital punishment as a sentence for homosexual activity, although in Victoria it remained as such when committed while also inflicting bodily harm or to a person younger than the age of fourteen until 1949. The last person arrested for homosexual sex in Australia was a man in 1984 in Tasmania. The last part of Australia to legalise consensual homosexual sex between adults was Tasmania in 1997. In 2017, same-sex marriage was legalised by the Australian government.

Of the seven men in Australian history known to have been executed for sodomy, six cases involved the sexual abuse of minors; only one of the seven cases was for consensual acts between adults. In that sole case, Alexander Browne was hanged at Sydney on 22 December 1828 for sodomy with his shipmate William Lyster on the whaler Royal Sovereign; Lyster was also convicted and sentenced to death, but his sentence was commuted before execution. Joseph Fogg was hanged at Hobart on 24 February 1830 for an "unnamed crime", also described in one source as an "abominable crime". The exact nature of his crime is unclear; while likely a same-sex sexual offence given the labels applied ('unnamed', 'abominable'), it is uncertain whether it was for an adult consensual act, same-sex rape, or abuse of a minor.

=== Nazi Germany ===
During the period of Nazi Germany from 1933 to 1945, homosexual men were persecuted with thousands being imprisoned in concentration camps (and eventually extermination camps) by the Nazi regime. Roughly 5,000–15,000 were sent to the concentration camps, with the death rate being estimated to be as high as 60%. Homosexuals in the camps suffered an unusual degree of cruelty by their captors, including being used as target practice on shooting ranges.

In a 1937 speech, Himmler argued that SS men who had served sentences for homosexuality should be transferred to a concentration camp and shot when trying to escape. This policy was never implemented, and some SS men were acquitted on homosexuality charges despite evidence against them. A few death sentences against SS men for homosexual acts were pronounced between 1937 and 1940. In a speech on 18 August 1941, Hitler argued that homosexuality should be combatted throughout Nazi organizations and the military. In particular, homosexuality in the Hitler Youth must be punished by death in order to protect youth from being turned into homosexuals, however the Hitler Youth never implemented this policy.

After learning of Hitler's remark, Himmler decided that the SS must be at least as tough on homosexuality and drafted a decree mandating the death penalty to any member of the SS and police found guilty of engaging in a homosexual act. Hitler signed the decree on 15 November 1941 on the condition that there be absolutely no publicity, worried that such a harsh decree might lend fuel to left-wing propaganda that homosexuality was especially prevalent in Germany. Since it could not be published in the SS newspaper, the decree was communicated to SS men one-on-one by their superiors. However, this was not done consistently and many arrested men asserted that they had no knowledge of the decree.

Even after the decree, only a few death sentences were pronounced. Himmler often commuted the sentence especially if he thought that the accused was not a committed homosexual, but had suffered a one-time mistake (particularly while drunk). Many of those whose sentence was commuted were sent to serve in the Dirlewanger Brigade, a penal unit on the Eastern Front, where most were killed. After late 1943, because of military losses, it was the policy to recycle SS men convicted of homosexuality into the Wehrmacht.

The 1933 law on habitual criminals also allowed for execution after the third conviction. On 4 September 1941 a new law allowed the execution of dangerous sex offenders or habitual criminals when "the protection of the Volksgemeinschaft or the need for just atonement require it". This law enabled authorities to pronounce death sentences against homosexuals, and is known to have been employed in four cases in Austria. In 1943, Wilhelm Keitel, head of the Oberkommando der Wehrmacht, authorized the death penalty for soldiers convicted of homosexuality in "particularly serious cases". Only a few executions of homosexual Wehrmacht soldiers are known, mostly in conjunction with other charges, especially desertion. Some homosexuals were executed at Nazi euthanasia centers, such as Bernburg or Meseritz-Obrawalde. It is difficult to estimate the number of homosexuals directly killed during the Nazi era.

=== United Kingdom ===
In England and Wales from 1533, under the Buggery Act 1533, capital felony for any person to "commit the detestable and abominable vice of buggery with mankind or beast", was enacted, repealed and re-enacted several times by the Crown, until it was reinstated permanently in 1563. Homosexual activity remained a capital offence until 1861. The last execution took place on 27 November 1835 when James Pratt and John Smith were hanged outside Newgate Prison in London.

=== United States ===
During the colonial era of American history, the various European nations which established colonies in the Americas brought their pre-existing laws against homosexuality (which included capital punishment) with them. The establishment of the United States after their victory in the Revolutionary War did not bring about any changes in the status of capital punishment as a sentence for being convicted of homosexual behavior. Beginning in the 19th century, the various state legislatures passed legislation which ended the status of capital punishment being used for those who were convicted of homosexual behavior. South Carolina was the last state, in 1873, to repeal the death penalty for homosexual behaviour from its statute books. The number of times the penalty was carried out is unknown. Records show there were at least two executions, and a number of more convictions with vague labels, such as "crimes against nature". The last confirmed execution for homosexuality in the United States was that of Jan Creoli in 1646.

=== Sudan ===
In July 2020, the sodomy law that previously punished gay men with up to 100 lashes for the first offence, five years in jail for the second and the death penalty the third time around was abolished, with new legislation reducing the penalty to prison terms ranging from five years to life. Sudanese LGBTQ activists hailed the reform as a 'great first step', but said it was not enough yet, and the end goal should be the decriminalisation of same-sex sexual activity altogether.

== See also ==
- Outline of capital punishment
- Media portrayals of transgender people
- Rape of males
