= LGBTQ rights in the United Arab Emirates =

LGBTQ rights in United Arab Emirates
- United Arab Emirates
- Legal status: Illegal under federal law: (article 409, Federal Crimes and Penalties law 2021) Minimum: 6 months imprisonment, only under complaint by legal guardian or spouse.
- Gender identity: No
- Military: No
- Discrimination protections: None

Family rights
- Recognition of relationships: No recognition of same-sex relationships
- Adoption: No

Lesbian, gay, bisexual, transgender and queer (LGBTQ) people in the United Arab Emirates face discrimination and legal challenges. Homosexuality is illegal in the United Arab Emirates (UAE). Under Article 409 of the Federal Crimes and Penalties Law (2021), consensual same-sex sexual conduct and extra-marital heterosexual intercourse are criminalised with a minimum sentence of six months' imprisonment. Prosecution can only be initiated upon a complaint filed by a spouse or guardian; without such a complaint, no criminal action may proceed.

There have been no known arrests or prosecutions for same-sex sexual activity in the UAE since at least 2015 (as of 2026). Individuals have been prosecuted for offences related to sexual and gender identity under public decency laws, for acts such as kissing in public, or for cross-dressing.

== Legal framework and history ==
The UAE's Federal Penal Code does not replace the legal system of each emirate, unless it is contrary to the federal law. Persons may be charged under the Federal Penal Code, or under a local (emirate) penal code.

The 2020 amendment to the federal penal code removed stoning and flogging as legally prescribed punishments. The subsequent Federal Crimes and Penalties Law (2021) does not prescribe the death penalty for consensual same-sex conduct. The death penalty for sexual offences under current UAE law applies exclusively to non-consensual acts, such as rape of a minor or rape resulting in death. All documented stoning sentences in UAE history involved heterosexual adultery and were either commuted or overturned. There has never been a documented case of the death penalty being applied for homosexual activity in the UAE.

=== Enforcement history ===
According to the British non-profit, Human Dignity Trust, as of 2020, all annual human rights reports from the U.S. Department of State on UAE after 2015, have stated there are no records of arrests or prosecutions for same-sex sexual activity in the country.

Involuntary medical and psychological "treatments", including administration of hormonal therapies, and detention for forced psychological treatments, have occurred. There have been reports of mistreatment in detention such as beatings, and forced rectal examinations, amounting to torture, have been consequences of such suspected or established same-sex sexual conduct.

== Legal status ==
The 1987 Federal Penal Code was repealed and replaced by the Federal Crimes and Penalties Law (Federal Decree-Law No. 31 of 2021), which came into force on 2 January 2022. Same-sex conduct is explicitly criminalised under Article 409(1)(b) of this law. The minimum penalty is six months' imprisonment; no maximum is prescribed.

Under Article 409(5), no criminal action may be brought except upon a complaint by the spouse or guardian of the complainant. The spouse or guardian may also withdraw the complaint at any time, which terminates any ongoing criminal action or suspends any penalty already imposed.

Since the UAE does not recognise same-sex marriage, and civil guardianship ends at age 18, no eligible complainant exists for consensual male-male sexual conduct between adults. Federal prosecution is therefore not possible. For female-female relations, an unmarried Muslim woman's father or male relative may qualify as a guardian under the Islamic wali concept, and a married woman's husband qualifies as a spouse, meaning prosecution of female-female conduct remains possible where either of these complainants exists.

The U.S. Department of State's 2022 report states:

Both civil law and sharia criminalize consensual same-sex sexual conduct between adults. The penalty for individuals who engage in "consensual sodomy with a man is a minimum prison sentence of six months" if a complaint is filed by the partner or the guardian. There were no known reports of arrests or prosecutions for consensual same-sex sexual conduct.

— U.S. Department of State, 2022 Report on Human Rights Practices: United Arab Emirates, p. 34

=== Abu Dhabi ===
==== Enforcement cases ====
In 2005, 26 young men were arrested when Abu Dhabi Police raided a social gathering at a hotel in a desert resort town. The police alleged the men were found engaging in cross-dressing and preparing to celebrate a "gay wedding". In discussing the raid, Mohammed bin Nukhaira Al Dhahiri, Minister of Justice, Islamic Affairs and Auqaf stated, "There will be no room for homosexual and queer acts in the UAE. Our society does not accept queer behaviour, either in word or in action". Initial reports suggested that some of the men were ordered to accept hormone "treatments" in exchange for lighter sentences, although the government subsequently backed off from these statements. Twelve of the men were found guilty and sentenced; eleven were given a five-year prison sentence, and one a one-year sentence. The eleven had reportedly confessed to "homosexual practices". The remaining fourteen were released after being found not guilty.

On 9 August 2017, Emirati police in Abu Dhabi detained two Singaporean nationals in a shopping mall. A court convicted and sentenced them to one year in prison "for attempting to resemble women". The UAE deported them on 28 August after they spent nearly three weeks in custody, much of that time in a cell they said was designated for "effeminate" people.

=== Dubai ===
==== Incidents and enforcement ====
In July 2007, a case involved the kidnapping and rape of a sixteen-year-old French-Swiss boy by a group of men. The boy stated in a closed court session that after leaving an arcade, he saw a 17-year-old acquaintance who offered to drive him home, after entering the car and driving past his home, the three men raped him. Initially, the police treated the victim as a suspect and the fear of being charged under Article 177 prompted the boy and his family to leave the country. His mother accused the UAE authorities of not notifying her family that one of the rapists was HIV-positive, thus delaying the seeking of medical attention for her son. No formal charges were brought against the teenager who testified against his rapists. The story generated international media attention with government representatives defending the criminal laws against homosexuality, saying: "This is a conservative society. Homosexuality, conducted homosexuality is an illegal act. And we are not ashamed of that". The boy was also awarded AED 15 million (US$4 million) in civil compensation.

The legal and social sanctions against LGBTQ people mean that no formal LGBTQ organizations or nightclubs exist in Dubai. A nightclub sponsored a special night for the LGBTQ community, only to be shut down by the government.

In 2012, police arrested two Indian men for having consensual sex in a public toilet at a bus station. Both were jailed for six months each and were deported following their prison terms. In the same year, a 28-year-old British man who drunkenly had sex with another man in public were both sentenced to three years in jail followed by deportation. On 21 March 2012, police raided and broke up a gay party consisting of 30 men. On 7 June 2012, a Belgian man admitted to police that he was in a homosexual relationship with a Filipino. He was arrested and jailed for a year to be followed by deportation.

In December 2013, Karen Mke and Kamilla Satto, two transgender women from Brazil, were arrested in Dubai for "imitating women" after calling the police due to prejudices they witnessed in the nightclub. After learning the two were transgender, they were arrested and the two were reportedly detained for two days without explanation. The women were not allowed to leave Dubai, and faced criminal charges. The two were held until March 2014 and were fined AED 10,000 (US$2722.50) and ordered to be deported.

Canadian YouTuber and model Gigi Gorgeous, who is a transgender woman, was detained for five hours at Dubai International Airport in August 2016 due to authorities not recognizing her gender as legitimate. Her passport was confiscated during her detention. After being released from detention, she departed immediately for Sweden.

In October 2017, a Scottish man from Stirling faced a three-year jail sentence after putting his hand on a man in a bar so as to not "bump and spill drinks". The tourist was arrested for public indecency after touching the other man's hip. The charges of public indecency were dropped following the intervention of the ruler of Dubai, Mohammed bin Rashid Al Maktoum.

== Gender identity and expression ==
Sex reassignment surgery is severely restricted to limited circumstances which are highly regulated by the state.

Under Article 412(2) of the Federal Crimes and Penalties Law (2021), only men who disguise themselves as women to enter a women-only space may be prosecuted for cross-dressing. This replaced the previous broader prohibition on wearing clothing 'inappropriate for one's sex' in any circumstances. The penalty is up to one year's imprisonment and a fine not exceeding AED 10,000."

Gay conversion practices are not prohibited or discouraged by any law or regulation.

== Living conditions ==
In May 2015, PlanetRomeo, an LGBTQ social network, published its first Gay Happiness Index (GHI). Gay men from over 120 countries were asked about how they feel about society's view on homosexuality, how they are treated by other people and how satisfied they are with their lives. The UAE was ranked 85th with a GHI score of 37.

No LGBTQI+ support or advocacy organizations operate openly in the country. Social attitudes towards homosexuality and varied gender expression, together with the likelihood of state repression, prevent the establishment of such organisations or community education on related issues.

=== Antidiscrimination ===
There are no protections under any UAE law or policy against discrimination on the basis of sexual orientation, gender identity or expression, or sex characteristics.

=== Censorship ===
The Government in the United Arab Emirates has restricted access to various websites and monitors chat rooms, instant messages and blogs. There were only a few reports of prosecutions and punishments but many people on the internet have been censored their conversations and identity in gay chat rooms. The country's only internet service provider has a proxy server which blocks any website that goes against the country's moral values. Sites regarding dating or marriage, LGBTQ issues, the Baháʼí Faith or sites related to unblocking the censorship are all inaccessible. Some reports or sites related to unblocking the censorship are all inaccessible. Reports even suggest that any site with the word gay or sex is blocked.

The UAE's Media Regulatory Office banned the screening of Pixar's Lightyear in cinemas in June 2022, stating that the movie violated the Emirates' media content standards. The movie was opposed for depicting a same-sex relationship. Later that month, Majid, a popular Arabic-language comic book series for children, came under investigation by the UAE authorities for allegedly promoting homosexuality. The magazine withdrew its May 2022 edition, which depicted a multi-colored character. In one dialogue the character said, "Amazing, I have the capability to colour things ... Ali will wish to become like me." According to The New Arab, a number of social media users had complained that Majid had intentionally used the Arabic word مثلي (mithli) in this character's speech, a word which means both a "homosexual" and "like me".

In June 2023, the UAE banned Spider-Man: Across the Spider-Verse, a week ahead of its expected release in the region. The movie failed to pass the Emirates' censorship requirements, due to a scene that depicted a glimpse of a transgender flag displaying the words "Protect Trans Lives". Also in June 2023, the Amazon company complied with the Emirati government's requirement to impose restrictions on its product listings and site-search capabilities. Under threat of penalties to the company, Amazon blocked search results for 150 terms on its UAE site, according to the New York Times. Input terms such as lgbtq, pride, and closeted gay return "no results" when used on Amazon in the UAE. Individual item listings were also removed; for example, the work Bad Feminist, by Roxane Gay, amongst other book titles.

Also in June 2023, the British dance-pop group Steps refused to do a show in Dubai over a contract clause that barred them from disclosing their sexuality, homosexuality being illegal in the UAE. A band member, Ian "H" Watkins said at some stage of life morals are more important than a "pot of gold gig", and that it was important to raise the issue.

== Summary table ==
Same-sex sexual activity legal	No Illegal: Minimum of 6 months by complaint of guardian or spouse /Unenforced: male-male relations because guardianship ends at 18.
Anti-discrimination laws in employment only	No
Anti-discrimination laws in the provision of goods and services	No
Anti-discrimination laws in all other areas (incl. indirect discrimination, hate speech)	No
Same-sex marriages	No
Recognition of same-sex couples	No
Stepchild adoption by same-sex couples	No Adoption is not legal for anyone of any gender or sexual orientation
Joint adoption by same-sex couples	No Adoption is not a legal option for any couple within the UAE, in accordance with Islamic law
LGBTQ history education allowed	No Illegal: reference to same-sex relationships or related matters is forbidden.
LGBTQ people allowed to serve openly in the military	No
Right to change legal gender	No
Conversion therapy banned	No
Access to IVF for lesbians	No Only a woman and a man married to each other may conceive using IVF. Fertility treatments using donor sperm or ova are disallowed for everyone, including married heterosexual couples
Access to gender identity treatment for minors with gender dysphoria	No
Commercial surrogacy for gay male couples	No Surrogacy is not legal for anyone, including married heterosexual couples
MSMs allowed to donate blood	No

== See also ==
- Human rights in the United Arab Emirates
- LGBT rights in the Middle East
- LGBT rights in Asia
- LGBT in Islam
- Capital punishment for homosexuality
