= LGBTQ rights in Brunei =

- Location in Brunei
- Legal status: Illegal since 1906 (as a British Protectorate)
- Penalty: De facto: 7 years' imprisonment, 30 lashes; (for married men); De jure: Death by stoning (for married men; in abeyance by moratorium)
- Gender identity: No official recognition; Sex reassignment surgery is illegal
- Military: No
- Discrimination protections: No protections

Family rights
- Recognition of relationships: No recognition of same-sex unions
- Adoption: No

Lesbian, gay, bisexual, transgender, and queer (LGBTQ) people in Brunei face legal challenges not experienced by non-LGBTQ residents. Both male and female expressions of homosexuality are illegal in Brunei. Sexual activity between men is de jure liable to capital punishment, with de facto lesser penalties of imprisonment and whipping applied; sex between women is punishable by caning or imprisonment. The sultanate applied a moratorium on the death penalty in 2019, which was still in effect as of May 2023. The moratorium could be revoked at any time.

OutRight Action International has described Brunei as "the country that has the most worrisome state of rights for LGBT people in Southeast Asia". LGBTQ Bruneians feel the need to remain very discreet about their sexual orientation.

The Brunei Project, established in 2015, seeks to promote human rights, including religious freedom, free speech, and LGBTQ rights in Brunei through social media. The group organised a private community event in 2016, celebrating Brunei's first "International Day Against Homophobia" event.

== Legality of same-sex sexual activity ==
Same-sex sexual activity became illegal in Brunei in 1906 when the sultanate became a British Protectorate. Straits Settlements (British territories in southeast Asia) law was applied by the 1906 Courts Enactment, which was repealed and updated by the Courts Enactment 1908.

Homosexual activity remained illegal after Brunei gained independence in 1984. Before the 2019 implementation of the Syariah Penal Code Order (SPCO), homosexual acts were punishable by up to 10 years imprisonment, even if they were private and consensual. From 2014, Brunei began a staged implementation of Sharia (Malay: Syariah) law. Provisions of the SPCO dealing with adultery and sodomy, prescribing death by stoning and corporal punishments, were scheduled to come into force on 3 April 2019.

Following widespread international condemnation and media attention, which included an open letter from American actor George Clooney calling for the boycott of the Sultan of Brunei's luxury hotels—The Beverly Hills Hotel and Hotel Bel-Air among them—the Brunei government extended its moratorium on the death penalty to encompass the SPCO in May 2019. Under the moratorium, the code's death by stoning penalty provisions are not enacted, for as long as the moratorium continues. The moratorium could be lifted at any time by the sultanate, allowing such death-by-stoning punishments to commence. As the sultan is an absolute monarch with full executive power, removing the moratorium and reinstating capital punishment would require minimal process and could occur without warning.

When the move to Sharia law was announced, the United Nations urged Brunei to review its laws in this area, which has been described by media outlets as "medieval", and "uncivilized". Their implementation was delayed until April 2019, after the Sultan declared that these laws should be regarded as "special guidance" from God. LGBTQ people, as well as the Christian and Buddhist minorities, have been advised by international human rights activists to remain discreet in the country. Anyone convicted of "tarnishing the image of Islam" may be heavily punished.

Under the SPCO, the de jure penalty for same-sex sexual relations between men is death by stoning, if married, provided they admit to the acts or four male adult Muslim eyewitnesses testify to the acts. If the evidentiary standards are not met, the maximum penalty is seven years imprisonment and a whipping of thirty strokes. This is also the de facto penalty while the moratorium on the death penalty continues. For unmarried men, one year in prison or 100 lashes is the penalty. Sexual relations between women is punishable by a combination of any two of three stipulated penalties: a caning of forty lashes, a maximum prison term of 10 years, and a fine of up to B$40,000.

== Gender identity and expression ==
Brunei does not allow changing one's name or gender on official documents. Sex reassignment surgery is not allowed.

On 11 March 2015, a civil servant was fined B$1,000 under the Syariah Penal Code Order for cross-dressing.

== Living conditions ==
The LGBTQ community in Brunei is very hidden and secret. Bruneian society tends to associate homosexuality with "effeminate men".

In 2011, academics at the University of Brunei made a formal study of gay people in Brunei. The study illustrated how they chose to remain silent and discreet about their sexual orientation. The researchers were only able to find 29 LGBTQ respondents, some of whom were foreigners. The country had a total population of 460,345 as of 2020.

== 2017 United States Department of State report ==
In 2017, the United States Department of State reported the following, concerning the status of LGBTQ rights in Brunei:

Secular law criminalizes "carnal intercourse against the order of nature". In July Chapter 22 of the Penal Code Order was amended to increase the minimum sentence for such carnal intercourse to between 20 and 50 years' incarceration. The amendment was primarily applied in cases of rape or child abuse wherein both attacker and victim are male, because existing law covers only assault of a woman by a man. The SPC [Sharia Penal Code] bans liwat (anal intercourse) between men or between a man and a woman who is not his wife. If implemented, this law would impose death by stoning. The SPC also prohibits men from dressing as women or women dressing as men "without reasonable excuse" or "for immoral purposes". There were no known convictions during the year.

Members of the lesbian, gay, bisexual, transgender, and intersex (LGBTI) community reported unofficial and societal discrimination in public and private employment, housing, recreation, and in obtaining services including education from state entities. LGBTI individuals reported intimidation by police, including threats to make public their sexuality, to hamper their ability to obtain a government job, or to bar graduation from government academic institutions. Members of the LGBTI community reported the government monitored their activities and communications. Events on LGBTI topics were subject to restrictions on assembly and expression. The LGBTI community reported that the government would not issue permits for such events.

== Summary table ==
Same-sex sexual activity legal	No Penalty (de facto): For men, up to 7 years in prison and 30 lashes; lower penalties exist for unmarried men. For women, maximum 10-year imprisonment or 40 lashes. Penalty (de jure, under moratorium): Rajm (death by stoning) – in abeyance. Lesser penalties for women and unmarried men. Moratorium may be lifted at any time.
Equal age of consent	No
Anti-discrimination laws in employment	No
Anti-discrimination laws in the provision of goods and services	No
Anti-discrimination laws in all other areas (incl. indirect discrimination, hate speech)	No
Same-sex marriage(s)	No
Recognition of same-sex couples	No
Stepchild adoption by same-sex couples	No
Joint adoption by same-sex couples	No
Adoption by single people regardless of sexual orientation	No
LGBTQ people allowed to serve in the military	No
Right to change legal gender	No
Access to IVF for lesbians	No
Automatic parenthood for both spouses after birth	No
Commercial surrogacy for gay male couples	No
MSMs allowed to donate blood	No

== See also ==
- LGBTQ rights in Asia
- Caning in Brunei
- Capital punishment in Brunei
- Capital punishment for homosexuality
- Criminalization of homosexuality
- Prince Azim of Brunei
