= LGBTQ rights in Jordan =

- Jordan
- Legal status: Legal since 1951
- Gender identity: Legal from 2014 and 2017, illegal afterwards
- Discrimination protections: None

Family rights
- Recognition of relationships: No recognition of same-sex couples

Lesbian, gay, bisexual, transgender and queer (LGBTQ) individuals in Jordan face significant challenges and discrimination not experienced by non-LGBTQ persons.

Same-sex sexual activity was illegal in Jordan under the British Mandate Criminal Code Ordinance (No. 74 of 1936) until 1951 when Jordan drafted its own penal code which did not criminalise homosexuality, after having gained independence in 1946. Despite the absence of explicit laws that criminalize same-sex relations, the combination of vague morality laws, public hostility, and the absence of legal protection, gives license to security forces and private individuals to target LGBTQ people with impunity.

According to 2023 Human Rights Watch report, Jordan's "cybercrime" and "morality" laws have been used to persecute LGBTQ people. Security forces intimidated LGBTQ activists with threats of violence, arrest, and prosecution, forcing several activists to shut down their organizations, discontinue their activities, and in some cases, flee the country.

In August 2023, Jordanian authorities promulgated a new cybercrime law that threatens internet users' right to anonymity, and includes provisions that could be used by authorities to target digital content around gender and sexuality, as well as individuals who use digital platforms to advocate for the rights of LGBTQ people. An anonymous activist told Human Rights Watch that the new law will "destroy all forms of LGBTQ expression online" and intensify "interference in people's private lives." One of the few LGBTQ rights activists who has remained in Jordan described her current reality: "Merely existing in Amman has become terrifying. We cannot continue our work as activists, and we are forced to be hyperaware of our surroundings as individuals".

== Criminal laws ==
The British Mandate Criminal Code Ordinance criminalized homosexuality with up to 10 years in prison, until 1951 when Jordan adopted its own penal code that did not criminalize homosexuality. In 1951, a revision of the Jordanian Criminal Code legalized private, adult, non-commercial, and consensual homosexual acts, with the age of consent set at 18, regardless of gender and/or sexual orientation.

The Jordanian penal code no longer permits family members to beat or kill a member of their own family whose "illicit" sexuality is interpreted as bringing "dishonor" to the entire family. As of 2013, the newly revised Penal Code makes honor killings, as a legal justification for murder, illegal.

The Jordanian penal code gives the police discretion when it comes to protecting the public peace, which has sometimes been used against gay people organizing social events.

=== History ===
The first time that the Jordanian government made any public statement regarding LGBTQ rights was at the Fourth World Conference on Women held in 1995. The international conference sought to address women's rights issues on a global scale, and a proposal was made to have the conference formally address the human rights of gay and bisexual women. The Jordanian delegates to the conference helped to defeat the proposal. More recently, the kingdom's United Nations delegates have also opposed efforts to have the United Nations itself support LGBTQ rights, although this later proposal was eventually adopted by the United Nations.

The Jordanian government also tolerates a few cafés in Amman that are widely considered to be gay-friendly.

Books@Cafe opened in 1997 and remains a popular bookstore and cafe for patrons supportive of "creativity, diversity and tolerance". In the twenty-first century, a Jordanian male model, Khalid, publicly came out and has been supportive of a general interest gay-themed magazine published in Jordan.

"Growing up, it was hard for me to find topics, subjects and publications that I could relate to! In my country, most magazines rejected me and my ideas due to my young age at the time, and I felt like an outcast in my own society!"

== Transgender rights ==
In 2014, Jordan's Cassation Court, the highest court in Jordan, allowed a transgender woman to change her legal name and sex to female after she brought forth medical reports from Australia. The head of the Jordanian Department of Civil Status and Passports stated that two to three cases of change of sex reach the Department annually, all based on medical reports and court orders.

District courts are responsible for looking at cases of legal sex change in Jordan. The decision is ultimately left to the judge. Normally, the court assigns a medical committee to examine the claimant before making a decision on the case.

The "Medical Responsibility Law" was passed by the Jordanian Parliament in 2018 defining the terms "changing of sex" and "correction of sex" for the first time. The law contains vague descriptions of the two terms, outlawing the first and legalizing the latter. According to the new law, performing any surgical procedure that changes the sexual characteristics of a person whose "biological and psychological sex characteristics are clear or aligned to one sex" is criminalized, which could be used to criminalize doctors who perform any gender-affirming surgery on transgender people.

== Media and press ==
The Press and Publication Law was amended in 1998 and 2004. The initial document prohibited the depiction or endorsement of "sexual perversion". The revised edition in 2004 has a few provisions of direct impact on LGBTQ rights. First, the content ban on "sexual perversion" has been replaced with a general requirement that the press "respect the values of ... the Arab and Islamic nation" and that the press must also avoid encroaching into people's private lives.

In 2007, the first LGBTQ-themed Jordanian publication My.Kali was launched. A year later, My.Kali started publication online, named after openly gay model Khalid Abdel-Hadi, making major headlines, as it is the first LGBTQ publication to ever exist in the MENA region, with one of the only faces in the pan-Arab region.

"Should society accept homosexuality?"
1. No (93.0%)
2. Yes (7.00%)

An article for Al Jazeera English titled "Pushing for Sexual Equality in Jordan" stated: "Earlier this year, they published the magazine’s 50th issue, and celebrated the magazine’s seven-year anniversary. Kali is on the cover, hugging a sculpture head, his naked torso covered in white dust. The headline reads: “Tell Me Little White Secrets!”" The article was soon removed by the official site, and pasted on blogs and pages instead, due to the huge stir the article caused at the time. "... an AJ foreign journalist wrote a favourable article two years ago on Jordan's only LGBTI magazine My.Kali Magazine but a day later the article was removed from its website and the journalist severely reprimanded." Journalist Dan Littauer writes on his official Facebook page, regarding Qatar's attempts of hushing local medias, and freedom of the press. The magazine regularly features non-LGBTQ artists on their covers to promote acceptance among other communities and was the first publication to give many underground and regional artists their first covers like Yasmine Hamdan, lead singer of the band Mashrou' Leila, Hamed Sinno, Alaa Wardi, Zahed Sultan and many more. "Jordan is a very traditional country, and we're considered controversial in Jordan for simply breaking the stereotype and stepping out of norm," Khalid told Egypt Independent.

== Public opinion ==
According to a 2019 survey by the Arab Barometer questioned: "Should (Jordanian) Society Accept Homosexuality?" Results showed 93% of Jordanians answered no, 7% answered yes.

According to that same 2019 survey conducted by the Arab Barometer, 21% of respondents considered honor killings acceptable, compared to 7% who accepted homosexuality.

== Summary table ==
Same-sex sexual activity legal	Yes (Since 1951)
Equal age of consent (18)	(Since 1951)
Anti-discrimination laws in employment	No
Anti-discrimination laws in the provision of goods and services	No
Anti-discrimination laws in all other areas (incl. indirect discrimination, hate speech)	No
Same-sex marriages	No
Recognition of same-sex couples	No
Step-child adoption by same-sex couples	No
Joint adoption by same-sex couples	No
Gays and lesbians allowed to serve openly in the military	No
The right to change legal gender	(Illegal since 2018)
Access to IVF for lesbians	No
Homosexuality declassified as an illness	No
Commercial surrogacy for gay male couples	No
MSM allowed to donate blood	(Not explicitly banned)

== See also ==
- Human rights in Jordan
- LGBT rights in the Middle East
- LGBT rights in Asia
