= LGBTQ rights in Mauritania =

- Mauritania
- Legal status: Illegal since 1983: Islamic law (Sharia) is applied
- Penalty: De jure: Capital punishment for men, (not enforced; under moratorium); up to 2 years in prison and a fine for women. De facto: Up to 2 years in prison and a fine for both men and women.
- Gender identity: No
- Military: No
- Discrimination protections: None

Family rights
- Recognition of relationships: No recognition of same-sex relationships
- Adoption: No

Lesbian, gay, bisexual, transgender, and queer (LGBTQ) people in Mauritania face severe legal challenges not experienced by non-LGBTQ residents. Both male and female kinds of same-sex sexual activity are illegal in Mauritania. Openly homosexual Muslim men face stoning to death, though there have been no known cases of executions caused by homosexuality charges in the country; whereas women who have sex with women face prison.

== Law regarding same-sex sexual activity ==
Law in Mauritania is based on Sharia. According to the Article 308 of the 1983 Criminal Code, "Any adult Muslim man who commits an impudent or unnatural act with an individual of his sex will face the penalty of death by public stoning" (Rajm). Since the law describes Muslim men, it is unclear how it would be applied to non-Muslim men. Women face prison between three months to two years imprisonment, and a fine of 5,000 to 60,000 Mauritanian Ouguiya.

=== Enforcement ===
According to the Human Dignity Trust and Amnesty International, the death penalty has not been imposed since 1986. The government confirmed an unofficial moratorium on the death penalty for sexual activity between men in 2021.

In January 2020, ten men were arrested and arrested and detained after a video them allegedly celebrating a gay wedding was posted to social media. It was later revealed the event was a birthday party. According to the local police commissioner, the men were arrested for imitating women. According to the police report, eight of the men confessed to being homosexual; they were subsequently persecuted. One woman also received a one year suspended sentence for inciting debauchery due to her presence at the event. In 2025, two men were arrested after a video of them kissing was widely shared on Facebook.

== Legal protections ==
There are no legal protections against discrimination or hate crimes for LGBTQ+ people. There is no legal recognition of transgender people. The law criminalizes raping women, but not corrective rape against LGBTQ+ people. There is no law against conversion therapy nor any reports of it occurring in the country. Intersex medical interventions on children are not banned. There are no reported cases of it occurring in the country in 2023.

== Living conditions ==
The U.S. Department of State's 2023 human rights report found that, "LGBTQI+ persons were sometimes harassed and arbitrarily arrested and detained by the National Police, the General Group for Road Safety, community members, and family." Although local non-governmental organizations say there has been a decrease in harassment from public authorities, most LGBTQ+ people find it safer to conceal their sexual orientation or gender identity, or intersex variation.

Mauritanian society is largely conservative. It is widely believed that human immunodeficiency virus (HIV) and homosexuality are brought into the country by Senegalese and Gambian refugees. There is little social tolerance for LGBTQ+ people. A survey conducted from 2021 to 2023 found that 77 percent of Mauritanian respondents would either dislike or strongly dislike having a homosexual neighbor. LGBTQ+ people often experience discrimination when seeking housing, employment, education, and healthcare.

Groups for LGBTQ+ rights are not officially allowed, so they often meet discreetly. NouakchottSolidarity, the first association in the country to promote LGBTQ+ rights, was founded in 2015. When religious leaders are opposed to society's treatment against homosexuality, they tend to withhold their views from the public.

== Summary table ==
Same-sex sexual activity legal	No Penalty (de jure): Execution for men, (not enforced; under moratorium), up to 2 years in prison and fines for women) No Penalty (de facto) : Penalty: Up to 2 years in prison and fines for both men and women.
Equal age of consent	No
Anti-discrimination laws in employment only	No
Anti-discrimination laws in the provision of goods and services	No
Anti-discrimination laws in all other areas (incl. indirect discrimination, hate speech)	No
Same-sex marriages	No
Recognition of same-sex couples	No
Stepchild adoption by same-sex couples	No
Joint adoption by same-sex couples	No
LGBTQ people allowed to serve openly in the military	No
Right to change legal gender	No
Access to IVF for lesbians	No
Commercial surrogacy for gay male couples	No
MSMs allowed to donate blood	No

== See also ==
- Capital punishment in Mauritania
- Human rights in Mauritania
- Capital punishment for homosexuality
