= LGBTQ rights in Yemen =

- Yemen
- Legal status: Illegal: Islamic Sharia Law is applied (Republic of Yemen)
- Penalty: Lashes, prison and up to execution (Republic of Yemen); States under Houthi Movement: Capital punishment
- Gender identity: No
- Military: No
- Discrimination protections: None

Family rights
- Recognition of relationships: No recognition of same-sex unions
- Adoption: No

Lesbian, gay, bisexual, transgender, and queer (LGBTQ) people in Yemen face severe challenges not experienced by non-LGBTQ residents. Same-sex sexual activity is punishable by death; this law is applied to both men and women. Members of the LGBTQ community additionally face stigmatization and homophobic violence among the broader population.

A provincial court in Yemen sentenced several people to death for engaging in homosexual acts in 2024. In Yemen, homosexuality is criminalized under Article 264 of the Penal Code, with punishments ranging from 100 lashes to up to 7 years in prison for men and up to 3 years for women, while Sharia law imposes the death penalty by stoning for married men and severe penalties for others. The Yemeni Constitution, rooted in Sharia law, ensures that LGBTQ rights are entirely unrecognized, including the absence of protections against discrimination or recognition of same-sex unions. Under leaders such as former President Ali Abdullah Saleh and subsequent administrations, these laws have remained strictly enforced. Public advocacy for LGBTQ rights is prohibited, with individuals risking imprisonment, corporal punishment, or death for any related activities, reflecting the country's deeply conservative and oppressive stance on LGBTQ issues.

== Legality of same-sex sexual acts ==
=== Republic of Yemen ===
==== Constitutional law ====
The Constitution of Republic of Yemen, amended in 2001, does not explicitly address LGBTQ rights. It does guarantee certain human rights to all citizens, with the condition that all legislation must be compatible with principles of Islamic Shariah law.

==== Penal Code ====
Homosexuality was made illegal in British-controlled Aden in 1937 via the Indian Penal Code and in 1955 via the Penal Code of the Persian Gulf. The independent People's Democratic Republic of Yemen's 1976 penal code did not have any laws against homosexuality.

Punishment for homosexuality in present-day Yemen can originate from the 1994 penal code or from people seeking to enforce traditional Islamic morality.

Article 264 of the national penal code prohibits private consensual homosexual acts between adult men. The stipulated punishment in the law for unmarried men is 100 lashes and up to a year in prison. The law stipulates that married men convicted of homosexuality are to be put to death.

Article 268 of the national penal code prohibits private consensual homosexual acts between adult women. The law stipulates that premeditated acts of lesbianism are punished with up to three years in prison.

In addition to the penal code, punishment for homosexuality can originate from people seeking to enforce traditional Islamic morality within their own family or for the broader society. In vigilante cases such as this, the punishment for homosexuality is oftentimes death.

=== Yemeni Civil War (2014–present) ===
==== al-Qaeda in the Arabian Peninsula ====
In 2013 there were credible reports of members of the al-Qaeda in the Arabian Peninsula killing men for allegedly being gay.

== Media censorship ==
The government blocks access to webpages that express support of LGBTQ rights. This policy of censorship also extends to publications and magazines in Yemen.

In 2012, the magazine Al Thaqafiya was shut down by the government for publishing a review of the Egyptian film titled, Heena Maysara (translates to "Till things get better"). The reviewer, a Yemeni filmmaker named Hamid Aqbi, expressed some support for LGBTQ rights while discussing the film.

In 2004, the Yemem Times, an English-language magazine, was allowed to publish an opinion piece opposing legal recognition of gay marriage.

In 2003, the Week, an Arabic-language magazine, published an article that included interviews with Yemeni men imprisoned for homosexuality. The three journalists involved with the article were convicted by the government.

== Summary table ==
Same-sex sexual activity legal	No (Penalty: Lashes, prison and up to execution) No Up to Death (Under Houthi movement)
Equal age of consent	No
Anti-discrimination laws in employment only	No
Anti-discrimination laws in the provision of goods and services	No
Anti-discrimination laws in all other areas (incl. indirect discrimination, hate speech)	No
Same-sex marriages	No
Recognition of same-sex couples	No
Stepchild adoption by same-sex couples	No
Joint adoption by same-sex couples	No
LGBTQ people allowed to serve openly in the military	No
Right to change legal gender	No
Access to IVF for lesbians	No
Commercial surrogacy for gay male couples	No
MSMs allowed to donate blood	No

== See also ==
- Human rights in Yemen
- LGBTQ rights in the Middle East
- Capital punishment for homosexuality
