= LGBTQ rights in Northern Cyprus =

- Northern Cyprus
- Legal status: Legal since 2014
- Gender identity: Legal gender change with sex reassignment surgery
- Military: Yes
- Discrimination protections: Yes

Family rights
- Recognition of relationships: No
- Adoption: No

Lesbian, gay, bisexual, transgender, and queer (LGBTQ) persons in TRNC (Turkish Republic of Northern Cyprus) face legal challenges not experienced by non-LGBT residents. Same-sex sexual activity has been legal in Northern Cyprus since 7 February 2014. Previous laws allowed three years prison sentences, according to Articles 171 and 173 of its criminal code. Female homosexuality was not criminalised. Arrests for homosexuality have occurred as recently as 2011.

The laws were a legacy of British colonial rule, left over after the island of Cyprus gained independence in the 1960s. While the Republic of Cyprus decriminalised homosexuality in 1998 in order to accede membership of the European Union (EU) in 2004, the north's disputed status means it lies outside the EU's jurisdiction.

Repeal of the criminalisation of male same-sex sexual activity had been under serious consideration since 2006. In October 2011, MEP Marina Yannakoudakis claimed that during a visit to Northern Cyprus, President Derviş Eroğlu promised her he would legalise homosexuality to bring it in line with Turkey, the Republic of Cyprus and the rest of Europe. In December 2011, it was announced that, due to mounting pressure from MEPs, Northern Cypriot lawmakers would repeal the law currently criminalising homosexuality. President Derviş Eroğlu, the incumbent leader of the government, expressed that he would sign the bill into law when it came to him.

This was delayed until two cases were brought against Northern Cyprus to the TRNC Constitutional Court and the European Court of Human Rights. Immediately after the case was lodged at the European Court, the TRNC Prime Minister's EU Coordination Centre drew up an amendment in April 2013 to repeal Articles 171, 172, and 173 of Chapter 154 of the republic's criminal code. This was expected to be approved, but was tabled.

If the legislation had failed to pass, the European Court of Human Rights would have likely heard the case and find criminalisation to be a violation of Article 8, in line with Dudgeon v United Kingdom.

On 27 January 2014, the Assembly of the Republic, the Northern Cypriot parliament, voted to abolish the criminal code provisions that outlawed same-sex relations between men. The bill was signed into law, and published in the official gazette on 7 February 2014. It took effect upon publication.

Calls have been made by non-governmental organizations to legalize same-sex marriage. In 2012, the Communal Democracy Party proposed a law that would have legalized same-sex marriages, but the legislation was opposed by the then-ruling National Unity Party.

The annual pride parade has been held in North Nicosia without incidents since 2014. In 2024, Mayor Mehmet Harmanci participated.

== Summary table ==
Same-sex sexual activity legal	Yes (Since 2014)
Equal age of consent (16)	Yes (Since 2014)
Anti-discrimination laws in employment only	Yes (Since 2014)
Anti-discrimination laws in the provision of goods and services	Yes (Since 2014)
Anti-discrimination laws in all other areas (incl. indirect discrimination, hate speech)	Yes (Since 2014)
Recognition of same-sex couples	No
Recognition of same-sex couples (e.g. registered partnership or civil union, etc.)	No
Joint adoption by same-sex couples	No
Adoption for single persons regardless of sexual orientation	Yes
Step-child adoption by same-sex couples	No
LGBT people allowed to serve openly in military	
Right to change legal gender	Yes
Access to IVF for lesbians	No
Conversion therapy banned on minors	No
Commercial surrogacy for gay male couples	No (Banned for opposite-sex couples also)
MSMs allowed to donate blood	

== See also ==
- Human rights in Northern Cyprus
- LGBTQ rights in Cyprus
- LGBTQ rights in Turkey
- LGBTQ rights in Akrotiri and Dhekelia
- Section 171 of the Criminal Code of Cyprus
- LGBTQ rights in Asia
- LGBTQ rights in Europe
