= LGBTQ rights in Turkmenistan =

- Turkmenistan
- Legal status: Illegal (for males) since 1927 (as Turkmen SSR); not criminalized between females
- Penalty: Up to 5 years imprisonment with fines
- Gender identity: No
- Military: No
- Discrimination protections: None

Family rights
- Recognition of relationships: No recognition of same-sex unions
- Adoption: No

Lesbian, gay, bisexual, transgender and queer (LGBTQ) people in Turkmenistan face active discrimination and stigmatization compared to non-LGBTQ residents. Turkmenistan is one of the only two post-Soviet states where male homosexual activity remains criminalized, along with Uzbekistan.

== Law ==
Male homosexuality is explicitly illegal and sodomy— defined as sexual intercourse between men —is punishable by up to 2 years in prison, with additional terms of 2 to 5 years in a labor camp possible, (Note: Sections 2−4 of Article 135 relate to non-consensual or otherwise harmful or abusive sex acts and attract higher penalties. These involve threats, force or violence [Article 135(2)]; or result in infection with HIV or other sexually transmitted diseases [Article 135(3) §d) and (4) §b)]; or are for "pederasty", or sex with a minor [Article 135(3) §c) and (4) §a)]. Such sexual violence and acts of child abuse, although all dealt with in the same article of the code that deals with consensual sex between adult males, are solely matters considered criminal even in jurisdictions where consensual adult same-sex sexual activity is not proscribed. For this reason, those penalties are not relevant here.) under the Criminal Code of Turkmenistan, Chapter 3; Article 135, section (1). In addition, the provisions of Article 19 of the code allow for increased penalties for repeat convictions, applying to any crime under the code. Prior to a 2019 amendment, the 1997 code's maximum term was 2 years. The 1927 code of the Turkmen SSR had far less detailed provisions than the 1997 code adopted after independence. The law was enforced rarely before the ascension of Gurbanguly Berdimuhamedow to presidency in 2006.

Investigations into offences under Article 135 are grossly humiliating and may involve torture by state and non-state actors. Homosexuality is institutionally perceived as a form of mental disorder. Repeat prosecutions can incur compulsory admission to psychiatric clinics where internees may be subjected to involuntary conversion therapy. No penal provisions exist for homosexual women who, along with transsexual people, are an unacknowledged category in Turkmen law.

=== Towards anti-discrimination legislation ===
Turkmenistan has consistently rejected pleas to implement anti-discrimination legislation, despite requests by multiple nations via three Universal Periodic Reviews. In dialogue with various wings of the United Nations, Turkmenistan has justified the discriminatory frameworks by arguing any deviations to be a potential threat to the fabric of Turkmen traditions and society. In February 2021, the Turkmen Government noted to the Office of the United Nations High Commissioner for Human Rights about intentions to "reconsider the reasoning of the article criminalizing consensual same-sex relations" and "study the option of introducing anti-discrimination legislation".

== Society and culture ==
No civil society exists in Turkmenistan, media is entirely owned by the state, and conducting field-surveys is very difficult. These conditions render scarce the availability of any surveillance data on LGBTQ rights and allied issues. However, reports of the extrajudicial consequences of being gay include: state-sponsored violence, including torture during criminal investigative process; and vigilante attacks, especially in prison. In October 2019, a gay doctor was tortured by the state-apparatus for a long span of time, before temporarily disappearing. In May 2020, multiple well-known figures from the modelling industry were arrested on the charges of homosexuality. Turkmen lesbians have been granted asylum in the United States. Gays have been documented to have sought refuge in the European Union.

== Summary table ==
Same-sex sexual activity legal	No Illegal for males under Article 135(1) of the Criminal Code. (Penalty: 2 to 5 years in prison.); Yes Legal for females.
Equal age of consent	No
Anti-discrimination laws in employment only	No
Anti-discrimination laws in the provision of goods and services	No
Anti-discrimination laws in all other areas (incl. indirect discrimination, hate speech)	No
Same-sex marriages	No
Recognition of same-sex couples	No
Step-child adoption by same-sex couples	No
Joint adoption by same-sex couples	No
LGBTQ people allowed to serve openly in the military	No
Right to change legal gender	No
Access to IVF for lesbians	No
Conversion therapy banned	No
Commercial surrogacy for gay male couples	No
MSM allowed to donate blood	No
Homosexuality declassified as a mental illness	No

== See also ==
- Human rights in Turkmenistan
- LGBTQ rights in Asia
