= GCC homosexuality test =

Proposed homosexuality test in Gulf states

The Gulf Cooperation Council homosexuality test was a proposed homosexuality test that would have been used in Gulf Cooperation Council countries to prevent any homosexual travelers from entering the countries concerned. Kuwaiti director of public health Yousuf Mindkar from the Ministry of Health initially proposed that routine medical examinations would have also screened for homosexuality. Obtaining a visa already requires passing a health examination for migrant workers from certain countries. Those who would have failed the tests would have had their visas revoked.

It has been suggested that concern for hosting the 2022 FIFA World Cup in Qatar, and fears for controversy in the case that football fans would have been screened, made Mindkar backtrack the plans and insist that it was a mere proposal. The proposal was set to be discussed in Oman on 11 November 2013 by a central committee tasked with reviewing the situation concerning expatriates. Previously in 2012 over 2 million expatriates across Gulf Cooperation Council countries were gender tested.

Homosexuality is illegal in most Gulf Cooperation Council member states including Saudi Arabia, Kuwait, the United Arab Emirates, Qatar and Oman, with the notable exception of Bahrain.

== Reactions ==
There is no known working medical test for homosexuality. Some gay activists expressed concern that the Kuwaiti test would have used anal probes. Lebanon uses such methods at police stations to determine what sexual practices suspected criminals have engaged in. One such instance was in 2012 when a movie theater was raided for pornography and 36 Lebanese men were subjected to anal examinations. Peter Tatchell and the UK-based foundation carrying his name demanded boycotting or cancelling the 2022 FIFA World Cup in Qatar. Amnesty International strongly opposed any plans to introduce tests for discriminatory purposes against sexual and gender minorities. Nasser Al Khater, the chief executive of the World Cup, said that “everyone is welcome” to visit the country to watch the matches and that no one would be discriminated against.

Richard Lane of gay rights charity group Stonewall noted that restricting freedom of movement due to sexual orientation would be problematic to Gulf states that have marketed themselves as open to international business.

== See also ==
- 2022 FIFA World Cup controversies
- Body cavity search
- Fruit machine (homosexuality test)
- LGBT in the Middle East
- Rectal examination
- Virginity test
