= List of LGBTQ rights articles by region =

List of LGBTQ rights by region, including countries, commonwealths, disputed territories, and other regions.

== International regions ==
- LGBTQ rights in La Francophonie
- LGBTQ rights in the Commonwealth of Nations
- LGBTQ rights in the Middle East
- LGBTQ rights in the European Union
- LGBTQ rights in the Post-Soviet states

== Africa ==
- Algeria
- Angola
- Benin
- Botswana
- Burkina Faso
- Burundi
- Cameroon
- Cape Verde
- Central African Republic
- Chad
- Comoros
- Republic of the Congo
- Democratic Republic of the Congo
- Djibouti
- Egypt
- Eritrea
- Eswatini (Swaziland)
- Ethiopia
- Equatorial Guinea
- Gabon
- (The Gambia) Gambia
- Ghana
- Guinea
- Guinea-Bissau
- Ivory Coast
- Kenya
- Lesotho
- Liberia
- Libya
- Madagascar
- Malawi
- Mali
- Mauritania
- Mauritius
- Morocco
- Mozambique
- Namibia
- Niger
- Nigeria
- Rwanda
- São Tomé and Príncipe
- Senegal
- Seychelles
- Sierra Leone
- Somalia
- South Africa
- South Sudan
- Sudan
- Tanzania
- Togo
- Tunisia
- Uganda
- Zambia
- Zimbabwe

=== Other regions ===
- Ascension Island
- Mayotte
- Réunion
- Somaliland
- Saint Helena
- Tristan da Cunha
- (Western Sahara) Sahrawi Arab Democratic Republic

== Americas ==
- Antigua and Barbuda
- Argentina
- (The Bahamas) Bahamas
- Barbados
- Belize
- Bolivia
- Brazil
- Canada
- Chile
- Colombia
- Costa Rica
- Cuba
- Dominica
- Dominican Republic
- Ecuador
- El Salvador
- Grenada
- Guatemala
- Guyana
- Haiti
- Honduras
- Jamaica
- Mexico
- Nicaragua
- Panama
- Paraguay
- Peru
- Saint Kitts and Nevis
- Saint Lucia
- Saint Vincent and the Grenadines
- Suriname
- Trinidad and Tobago
- United States
- Uruguay
- Venezuela

=== Other regions ===
- Anguilla
- Aruba
- Bermuda
- Bonaire
- British Virgin Islands
- Cayman Islands
- Clipperton Island
- Curaçao
- Falkland Islands
- French Guiana
- Greenland
- Guadeloupe
- Martinique
- Montserrat
- Puerto Rico
- (Saba (island)) Saba
- Saint Barthélemy
- (Collectivity of Saint Martin) Saint Martin
- Saint Pierre and Miquelon
- Sint Eustatius
- Sint Maarten
- Turks and Caicos Islands
- (United States Virgin Islands) U.S. Virgin Islands

== Antarctica ==
- Antarctica

=== Other regions ===
- (Norway) Bouvet Island
- French Southern and Antarctic Lands
- (Australia) Heard and McDonald Islands
- (South Georgia and the South Sandwich Islands) South Georgia and South Sandwich Islands

== Asia ==
- Afghanistan
- Bahrain
- Bangladesh
- Bhutan
- Brunei
- Cambodia
- People's Republic of China
- India
- Indonesia
- Iran
- Iraq
- Israel
- Japan
- Jordan
- Kazakhstan
- Kuwait
- Kyrgyzstan
- Laos
- Lebanon
- Malaysia
- Maldives
- Mongolia
- Myanmar
- Nepal
- North Korea
- Oman
- Pakistan
- Philippines
- Qatar
- Saudi Arabia
- Singapore
- South Korea
- Sri Lanka
- Syria
- Tajikistan
- Thailand
- Timor-Leste
- Turkmenistan
- United Arab Emirates
- Uzbekistan
- Vietnam
- Yemen

=== Other regions ===
- British Indian Ocean Territory
- Christmas Island
- Cocos (Keeling) Islands
- Hong Kong
- Macau
- Palestine
- Taiwan (Republic of China)

== Europe ==
- Albania
- Andorra
- Armenia
- Austria
- Azerbaijan
- Belarus
- Belgium
- Bosnia and Herzegovina
- Bulgaria
- Croatia
- Cyprus
- Czech Republic
- Denmark
- Estonia
- Finland
- France
- (Georgia (country)) Georgia
- Germany
- Greece
- Hungary
- Iceland
- (Republic of Ireland) Ireland
- Italy
- Latvia
- Liechtenstein
- Lithuania
- Luxembourg
- Malta
- Moldova
- Monaco
- Montenegro
- Netherlands
- North Macedonia
- Norway
- Poland
- Portugal
- Romania
- Russia
- San Marino
- Serbia
- Slovakia
- Slovenia
- Spain
- Sweden
- Switzerland
- Turkey
- Ukraine
- United Kingdom

=== Other regions ===
- Abkhazia
- Akrotiri and Dhekelia
- Åland
- Faroe Islands
- Gibraltar
- Guernsey
- Isle of Man
- Jersey
- Kosovo
- Northern Cyprus
- South Ossetia
- (Sovereign Military Order of Malta) Sovereign Order of Malta
- Svalbard
- Transnistria
- Vatican City

=== Former countries ===
- East Germany
- Soviet Union
- (Socialist Federal Republic of Yugoslavia) Yugoslavia

== Oceania ==
- Australia
- Fiji
- Kiribati
- Marshall Islands
- Federated States of Micronesia
- Nauru
- New Zealand
- Palau
- Papua New Guinea
- Samoa
- Solomon Islands
- Tonga
- Tuvalu
- Vanuatu

=== Other regions ===
- American Samoa
- Cook Islands
- Easter Island
- French Polynesia
- Guam
- New Caledonia
- Niue
- Norfolk Island
- Northern Mariana Islands
- Pitcairn Islands
- Tokelau
- (United States Minor Outlying Islands) U.S. Minor Outlying Islands
- Wallis and Futuna

== See also ==
- LGBTQI+ rights at the United Nations
- Legal status of transgender people
- Intersex human rights
