= LGBTQ rights in Aruba =

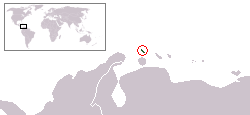
- Aruba
- Legal status: Legal
- Military: Yes
- Discrimination protections: Discrimination based on "heterosexual or homosexual orientation" prohibited

Family rights
- Recognition of relationships: Same-sex marriage since 2024
- Adoption: No

The rights of lesbian, gay, bisexual, transgender, and queer (LGBTQ) people in Aruba, a constituent country of the Kingdom of the Netherlands, have evolved remarkably in the past few decades. Both male and female forms of same-sex sexual activity are legal in Aruba.

On 12 July 2024, the Supreme Court of the Netherlands ruled that same-sex marriage is legal in Aruba, upholding the Appeals Court decision barring discrimination based on sexual orientation.

== Law regarding same-sex sexual activity ==
Same-sex sexual activity is legal in Aruba. The age of consent is 16 and is equal for both heterosexual and homosexual intercourse.

== Recognition of same-sex relationships ==
Same-sex marriage has been legal in Aruba since a 12 July 2024 ruling of the Supreme Court of the Netherlands.

Prior to that, as part of the Kingdom of the Netherlands, Aruba recognized as valid all same-sex marriages registered in the Netherlands as well as in Bonaire, Sint Eustatius and Saba (also known as the Caribbean Netherlands). The Aruban government initially did not recognize these marriages but was challenged by a lesbian couple who had legally married in the Netherlands and then moved to the island. The case went to the Dutch Supreme Court, which ruled on 13 April 2007 that the Kingdom's constituent countries must all recognize each other's marriages.

In April 2015, representatives of all four constituent countries agreed that same-sex couples should have equal rights throughout the Kingdom. That same month, a registered partnership bill was submitted to the Estates of Aruba.

On 22 August 2016, Desirée de Sousa-Croes, an openly gay Aruban MP, who married her same-sex partner in the Netherlands, introduced a bill to legalize registered partnerships. However, a vote on the bill was postponed to 8 September 2016 because some MPs still needed time to make up their minds. On 8 September 2016, the Aruban Parliament voted 11–5 to legalize registered partnerships. Registered partnerships are open to both opposite-sex and same-sex couples.

== Legislative attempts to legalize same-sex marriage ==
In 2024, the Parliament of Aruba voted twice on a bill aimed at legalizing same-sex marriage. The bill, introduced by MPs Miguel Mansur, Misha Raymond, Marisol Tromp, and Aquannette Gunn, was initially presented in June 2022 but faced challenges in gaining majority support.

The two initial votes in May and June of 2024 resulted in a tie, leading to the bill's rejection.

== Recognition of same-sex relationships ==
The court case leading to the legalization of same-sex marriage was supported by the LGBTQ+ rights organization Fundacion Orguyo Aruba.

== Discrimination protections ==
The Aruba Criminal Code (Dutch: Wetboek van Strafrecht; Papiamento: Kódigo Penal), enacted in 2012, prohibits unfair discrimination and incitement to hatred and violence on various grounds, including "heterosexual or homosexual orientation". Article 1:221 describes discrimination as "any form of discrimination, exclusion, restriction or preference, which has the purpose or effect of impacting or affecting recognition, enjoyment or the exercise of human rights and fundamental liberties in political, economic, social or cultural fields or in other areas of social life." Articles 2:61 and 2:62 provide for penalties ranging from fines to one year imprisonment.

== Living conditions ==
Aruba is frequently referred to as one of the Caribbean's most LGBT-friendly islands, with various venues, hotels and restaurants catering to LGBT clientele or otherwise advertising as "LGBT-friendly". Several specific gay bars and clubs have opened in the capital city of Oranjestad. According to local LGBT group Alternative Lifestyle Federation Aruba, "Aruba has always been accepting, as long as it's not in their face. People are out, but discreetly out. There has never been anything official." There are numerous LGBT associations in Aruba, including Equality Aruba (Igualdad Aruba), Equal Rights Aruba and Alternative Lifestyle Federation Aruba.

Despite this, some same-sex couples living in Aruba have claimed that this openness is a more recent phenomenon. Charlene and Esther Oduber-Lamer, whose court challenge forced Aruba and the other Dutch islands in the Caribbean to recognize same-sex marriage, reported frequent harassment and having rocks thrown at them. The Aruban government was particularly vocal in its opposition to same-sex marriage during the court challenge, which occurred between 2004 and 2007. The Roman Catholic Church, being the largest denomination on the island, has also contributed to more mainstream societal opposition to LGBT rights and same-sex marriage, especially compared to the Netherlands. Nevertheless, in 2016, the Aruban parliament voted to legalize same-sex and different-sex registered partnerships with many of the same rights as marriage, the first time a Caribbean parliament had done so.

== Summary table ==
Same-sex sexual activity legal	Yes
Equal age of consent	Yes
Anti-discrimination laws in employment	Yes (Since 2012)
Anti-discrimination laws in the provision of goods and services	Yes (Since 2012)
Anti-discrimination laws in all other areas	Yes (Since 2012)
Same-sex marriage	Yes (Since 2024)
Same-sex civil unions	Yes (Since 2021)
Stepchild adoption by same-sex couples	No
Joint adoption by same-sex couples	No
LGBT people allowed to serve in the military	Yes
Right to change legal gender	No
Access to IVF for lesbians	
Commercial surrogacy for gay male couples	No (Banned for opposite-sex couples as well)
MSMs allowed to donate blood	

== See also ==
- LGBT rights in the Netherlands
- LGBT rights in the Americas
- LGBT rights in Curaçao
- LGBT rights in Sint Maarten
- Same-sex marriage in Aruba, Curaçao and Sint Maarten
- Politics of Aruba
