= LGBTQ rights in Curaçao =

- Curaçao
- Legal status: Legal
- Military: Yes
- Discrimination protections: Discrimination based on "heterosexual or homosexual orientation" prohibited

Family rights
- Recognition of relationships: Same-sex marriage since 2024
- Adoption: No

Lesbian, gay, bisexual, transgender, and queer (LGBTQ) people in Curaçao have similar rights to non-LGBTQ people. Both male and female forms of same-sex sexual activity are legal in Curaçao. The Curaçao Criminal Code prohibits discrimination based on "heterosexual or homosexual orientation."

On 12 July 2024, the Supreme Court of the Netherlands ruled that same-sex marriage is legal in Curaçao, upholding the Appeals Court decision barring discrimination based on sexual orientation.

== Law regarding same-sex sexual activity ==
Same-sex sexual activity is legal in Curaçao. The age of consent is 16 and is equal for both heterosexual and homosexual intercourse.

== Recognition of same-sex relationships ==
Same-sex marriage has been legal in Curaçao since a 12 July 2024 ruling of the Supreme Court of the Netherlands.

Prior to that, as part of the Kingdom of the Netherlands, Curaçao must recognize same-sex marriages registered in the Netherlands as well as in Bonaire, Sint Eustatius, and Saba (also known as the Caribbean Netherlands) as valid. Despite this, same-sex couples cannot legally marry on the island itself nor are civil unions or other forms of recognition available.

In April 2015, representatives of all four constituent countries agreed that same-sex couples should have equal rights throughout the Kingdom.

In August 2015, in the case of Oliari and Others v. Italy, the European Court of Human Rights (ECHR) ruled that it is discriminatory to provide no legal recognition to same-sex couples. The ECHR has jurisprudence over Curaçao.

In 2017, a proposal to grant same-sex couples some limited rights was introduced to the Estates of Curaçao.

In September 2018, during the sixth edition of Curaçao Gay Pride, the local LGBT rights organizations FOKO Curaçao, Equality Curaçao and Curaçao Gay Pro handed over a bill to Vice President of Parliament Giselle McWilliam that would allow same-sex couples to marry in Curaçao. McWilliam applauded the action saying, "I think it's great. It shows that democracy is alive on Curaçao. That initiatives can come not only from the parliament or the government, but also from the people themselves. Everyone has the right to submit a bill, I am going to do everything to help this group, because they are also part of it." According to Prime Minister Eugene Rhuggenaath, who attended the parade, it is now time to debate the issue. He said, "Exclusion and discrimination against the LGBT community affects human rights." On 4 June 2019, the bill was submitted to the Estates of Curaçao, but later withdrawn in September 2020 from lack of support.

== Discrimination protections ==
The Curaçao Criminal Code (Dutch: Wetboek van Strafrecht; Papiamento: Kódigo Penal), enacted in 2011, prohibits unfair discrimination and incitement to hatred and violence on various grounds, including "heterosexual or homosexual orientation". Article 1:221 describes discrimination as "any form of discrimination, exclusion, restriction or preference, which has the purpose or effect of impacting or affecting recognition, enjoyment or the exercise of human rights and fundamental liberties in political, economic, social or cultural fields or in other areas of social life." Articles 2:61 and 2:62 provide for penalties ranging from fines to one year imprisonment.

== Living conditions ==
Curaçao has a large tourism industry. Several venues, hotels, and restaurants openly cater to LGBT tourists. The island is frequently referred to as one of the Caribbean's most LGBT-friendly areas and has the highest membership rate of businesses in the International Gay and Lesbian Travel Association in the Caribbean. Curaçao possesses quite a large gay scene, with the first pride parade having occurred in 2012. There are several LGBT associations on the island, including Equality Curaçao (Igualdat Kòrsou), FOKO Curaçao (Fundashon Orguyo Kòrsou), and Curaçao Gay Pro.

Despite this, local LGBT people have reported that discrimination and family rejections still exist. The Roman Catholic Church has a strong influence on the island, and has often opposed proposals and discussions aimed at improving LGBT rights.

In September 2017, in a speech called "historical" by LGBT activists, Prime Minister Eugene Rhuggenaath called for more acceptance at the Gay Pride parade in Willemstad.

== Summary table ==
Same-sex sexual activity legal	Yes
Equal age of consent	Yes
Anti-discrimination laws in employment	Yes (Since 2011)
Anti-discrimination laws in the provision of goods and services	Yes (Since 2011)
Anti-discrimination laws in all other areas	Yes (Since 2011)
Same-sex marriages	Yes (Since 2024)
Stepchild adoption by same-sex couples	No
Joint adoption by same-sex couples	No
LGBT people allowed to serve in the military	Yes
Right to change legal gender	No
Access to IVF for lesbians	
Commercial surrogacy for gay male couples	No (Banned regardless of sexual orientation)
MSMs allowed to donate blood	No

== See also ==
- LGBTQ rights in the Netherlands
- LGBTQ rights in the Americas
- LGBTQ rights in Aruba
- LGBTQ rights in Sint Maarten
- Same-sex marriage in Aruba, Curaçao and Sint Maarten
- Politics of Curaçao
