= LGBTQ rights in Sint Maarten =

- Sint Maarten
- Legal status: Legal
- Military: Yes
- Discrimination protections: Discrimination based on "heterosexual or homosexual orientation" prohibited

Family rights
- Recognition of relationships: Same-sex marriages performed in the Netherlands recognized
- Adoption: No

Lesbian, gay, bisexual, transgender and queer (LGBTQ) people in Sint Maarten may face legal challenges not experienced by non-LGBTQ residents. Both male and female same-sex sexual activity are legal in Sint Maarten, a constituent country of the Kingdom of the Netherlands, but same-sex marriage is not legal. Same-sex couples with Dutch nationality (Note: Citizens of Sint Maarten have Dutch nationality by jus sanguinis.) may travel to other countries in the Kingdom of the Netherlands to get married, but that will not provide the rights of marriage in Sint Maarten.

== Law regarding same-sex sexual activity ==
Same-sex sexual activity is legal in Sint Maarten. The age of consent is 15 and is equal for both heterosexual and homosexual intercourse.

== Recognition of same-sex relationships ==
As part of the Kingdom of the Netherlands, Sint Maarten must recognize as valid same-sex marriages registered in the Netherlands (including Bonaire, Sint Eustatius and Saba). Same-sex couples cannot legally marry on the island, however.

In April 2015, representatives of all four constituent countries agreed that same-sex couples should have equal rights throughout the Kingdom.

In August 2015, in the case of Oliari and Others v Italy, the European Court of Human Rights (ECHR) ruled that it is discriminatory to provide no legal recognition to same-sex couples. The ECHR has jurisprudence over Sint Maarten.

== Discrimination protections ==
The Sint Maarten Criminal Code (Dutch: Wetboek van Strafrecht), enacted in 2012, prohibits unfair discrimination and incitement to hatred and violence on various grounds, including "heterosexual or homosexual orientation". Article 1:221 describes discrimination as "any form of discrimination, exclusion, restriction or preference, which has the purpose or effect of impacting or affecting recognition, enjoyment or the exercise of human rights and fundamental liberties in political, economic, social or cultural fields or in other areas of social life." Articles 2:61 and 2:62 provide for penalties ranging from fines to one-year imprisonment.

== Living conditions ==
Sint Maarten is noted as an LGBTQ-friendly travel destination, with various venues, hotels, beaches, bars and restaurants catering to LGBTQ clientele or otherwise advertising as welcoming. Numerous gay cruises visit the island every year. Sint Maarten society is described as tolerant of LGBTQ people, though gay magazines report that this tolerance "is more economic than social". Among the locals, discrimination and bullying tend to be more widespread, where there is a "subtle climate of homophobia". The presence of the Roman Catholic Church as the largest denomination on the island has also contributed to more societal prejudice, especially compared to the Netherlands. Nevertheless, locals are often described as having a "live and let live" mentality, and overt discrimination is very rare. There is, however, one known exception to this; in April 2006, a same-sex couple from New York City was attacked outside a bar with tire irons by four men yelling anti-gay slurs. The couple was sent to hospital for serious injuries. The Dutch and Sint Maarten governments denounced the attack as "barbaric and heinous". The men were convicted in November 2006 of public violence and grievous bodily harm, with penalties ranging from six months to three years' imprisonment. One of the men had expressed remorse and had tried to stop the attack, resulting in a lesser sentence.

There is one gay association on the island, known as Sint Maarten Alliance for Equality (SAFE). There is also an LGBTQ tourist website, Gaysxm. The website provides information on various venues and areas on the island for gay tourists. Gaysxm is an LGBTQ tourist information portal and has also other social media accounts where they give relevant information about gay life on the island.

=== Politics ===
The Democratic Party Sint Maarten and the United People's Party, which merged in 2017 to form the United Democrats, both supported same-sex marriage. The Sint Maarten Christian Party has expressed opposition to same-sex marriage, but has stated that it supports "equal protections against discrimination, bullying and violence".

== Summary table ==
Same-sex sexual activity legal	Yes
Equal age of consent	Yes
Anti-discrimination laws in employment	Yes (Since 2012)
Anti-discrimination laws in the provision of goods and services	Yes (Since 2012)
Anti-discrimination laws in all other areas	Yes (Since 2012)
Same-sex marriages	No (Marriages performed within the Kingdom have minimal recognition)
Same-sex civil unions	No
Stepchild adoption by same-sex couples	No
Joint adoption by same-sex couples	No
LGBTQ people allowed to serve in the military	Yes (The Netherlands responsible for defence)
Right to change legal gender	No
Access to IVF for lesbians	
Commercial surrogacy for gay male couples	No
MSMs allowed to donate blood	No

== See also ==
- LGBTQ rights in the Netherlands
- LGBTQ rights in the Americas
- LGBTQ rights in Aruba
- LGBTQ rights in Curaçao
- Same-sex marriage in Aruba, Curaçao and Sint Maarten
- Politics of Sint Maarten
