= Same-sex marriage in Aruba, Curaçao and Sint Maarten =

Same-sex marriage has been legal in Aruba and Curaçao, two constituent countries of the Kingdom of the Netherlands, since 12 July 2024, following a ruling from the Supreme Court of the Netherlands that the ban on same-sex marriage was unconstitutional. The Supreme Court upheld a lower court ruling from the Joint Court of Justice of Aruba, Curaçao, Sint Maarten, and of Bonaire, Sint Eustatius and Saba, and legalized same-sex marriage in Aruba and Curaçao with immediate effect. The final constituent country of the Kingdom of the Netherlands, Sint Maarten, does not perform same-sex marriages, though marriages performed elsewhere in the Kingdom are recognized there.

Aruba has also recognized registered partnerships, providing many of the rights and benefits of marriage, since September 2021.

== Registered partnerships ==
Registered partnerships (Dutch: geregistreerd partnerschap, pronounced [ɣəreːɣɪˈstreːrt ˈpɑrtnərsxɑp]; Papiamento: union civil, pronounced [uˈnjon siˈvil]) offering several of the rights, benefits and obligations of marriage have been recognized in Aruba for different-sex and same-sex couples since 1 September 2021.

In November 2015, Prime Minister Mike Eman promised to support efforts to legalize registered partnerships for same-sex couples. On 8 September 2016, the Parliament of Aruba voted in favor of an amendment to the Aruban Civil Code legalizing registered partnerships for both same-sex and opposite-sex couples. The amendment would give couples in registered partnerships almost all of the rights offered to married couples, including access to spousal pensions and the possibility to make emergency medical decisions for a partner. Governor Fredis Refunjol granted royal assent on 23 September 2016. The law came into effect on 1 September 2021, after the government published a commencement order.

8 September 2016 vote in the Parliament
| Party | Voted for | Voted against | Abstained |
|---|---|---|---|
| Aruban People's Party | 7: Christiaan Gerard Dammers; Desirée Geneviève de Sousa-Croes; Gervais Rene Herdé; Jeffrey Clifton Gilbert Paul Kelly; Marisol Juliette Lopez-Tromp; Norman Ceril Roos; Melvin Glorinda Wyatt-Ras | 5: Lorna Casandra Jansen-Varlack; Donald Raymond Rasmijn; Alfred Marlon Sneek; Melvin Atanacio Tromp; Clarisca Nereida Velasquez | 1: Jennifer Justine Arends-Reyes |
| People's Electoral Movement | 3: Glenbert Francois Croes; Crispin Valentino Junior Romero; Evelyna Christina Wever-Croes | – | 4: Guillfred Fransis Besaril; Danguillaume Pierrino Oduber; Xiomara Jeanira Ruiz-Maduro; Juan Edberto Thijsen |
| Real Democracy | 1: Andin Ceasar Giovanni Bikker | – | – |
| Total | 11 | 5 | 5 |
| Total | 52.4% | 23.8% | 23.8% |

Following the passage of the registered partnership bill in Aruba, LGBT organizations in both Curaçao and Sint Maarten said they were hopeful such laws would also be approved in their respective countries. After an amendment giving cohabiting couples, including same-sex couples, some limited legal rights was proposed in the Parliament of Curaçao in 2017, former Prime Minister Gerrit Schotte suggested that a referendum on the legalisation of same-sex marriage be held on the island, though eventually no such referendum was held.

== Same-sex marriage ==
Recognition of same-sex unions in the Lesser Antilles and Puerto Rico Same-sex marriage Unregistered cohabitation Island subject to IACHR advisory opinion No recognition of same-sex couples Constitutional ban on same-sex marriage Same-sex sexual activity illegal but penalties not enforced

=== Background and summary ===
Aruba, Curaçao and Sint Maarten have separate civil codes from the Netherlands proper. As the civil codes did not mention same-sex marriage, several court cases had given information on the status of same-sex marriages in the three islands. Before the dissolution of the Netherlands Antilles, Curaçao and Sint Maarten were part of the former country, and as such their civil codes are based on the Civil Code of the Netherlands Antilles. Marriage licenses and other documents regarding civil status from elsewhere in the Kingdom—including the European and Caribbean parts of the country of the Netherlands—must be accepted by these constituent countries as a result of Article 40 of the Charter for the Kingdom of the Netherlands, and therefore registration of a same-sex marriage from the Netherlands is possible in all countries. In July 2024, the Supreme Court legalized same-sex marriage in Aruba and Curaçao. Sint Maarten does not perform same-sex marriages but registers marriages performed in the other parts of the Kingdom. However, acceptance and registration of a same-sex marriage does not mean automatic equal treatment: if a facility (e.g. social benefits) is only open to married couples, this applies in certain cases only to heterosexual couples. When a facility, however, is also open to non-married couples, then same-sex couples have to be included based on non-discrimination rules.

=== Legislative action ===
In Aruba, the opposition Accion 21 party introduced a same-sex marriage bill to Parliament in June 2022. On 8 May 2024, the Parliament could not reach an agreement on a newly-submitted same-sex marriage bill, with ten MPs voting in favor and ten against. One MP, Shailiny Tromp-Lee, abstained from the vote citing the complexity of the issue. A second vote was held on June 19, with the same result.

In September 2018, three LGBT rights organizations presented a bill to legalize same-sex marriage in Curaçao to the Vice President of Parliament, Giselle McWilliam. McWilliam applauded the action saying, "I think it's great. It shows that democracy is alive on Curaçao. That initiatives can come not only from the parliament or the government, but also from the people themselves. Everyone has the right to submit a bill, I am going to do everything to help this group, because they are also part of it." Prime Minister Eugene Rhuggenaath also welcomed the measure, saying that it "is now time to debate the issue", and that "exclusion and discrimination against the LGBT community affects human rights." On 4 June 2019, the bill was submitted to Parliament by members of the Partido MAN and the Real Alternative Party, but was withdrawn the following year due to lack of support. In May 2023, MP Rennox Calmes introduced a bill to ban same-sex marriage in the Constitution of Curaçao. The bill would have required a two-thirds majority in the Parliament to become law.

Following the December 2022 court ruling that Aruba's and Curaçao's same-sex marriage bans were unconstitutional, Melissa Gumbs, a member of the Parliament of Sint Maarten, said her party was planning on introducing a same-sex marriage bill to Parliament, noting that "there is precedent now within the Caribbean part of the kingdom (of the Netherlands) that it's not right to withhold same-sex marriage rights from people." In June 2023, Prime Minister Silveria Jacobs said she saw "insufficient space" for legalizing same-sex marriage in Sint Maarten. In response to a question from former MP Grisha Heyliger-Marten, Prime Minister Luc Mercelina confirmed in February 2025 that same-sex marriages performed elsewhere in the Kingdom may be registered in Sint Maarten. "When individuals are married in the Dutch Kingdom or EU countries, the Department of the Civil Registry registers the submitted request once all required documents are in order. The system is compatible with registering same-sex marriages", he said.

=== Court cases ===
==== Recognition of Dutch marriages ====
A case was launched in 2002 by a same-sex couple seeking recognition of their Dutch marriage in Aruba. Citing one of the partners' inability to receive health care benefits from the job of the other, as entitled to a spouse in a heterosexual marriage, they accused the Aruban Government of discrimination. The government was adamantly opposed to the court challenge. The couple reported that they often had rocks thrown at them, were suffering from depression and were residing in the Netherlands after leaving Aruba in November 2003 because of harassment when they tried to register as a married couple. In December 2004, the Aruba Court of First Instance ruled that their marriage should be registered in Aruba. The Aruban Government's stance was that the Civil Code of Aruba did not allow for same-sex marriage, and that it "[went] against Aruba's way of life". The government appealed the ruling to the Common Court of Justice of the Netherlands Antilles and Aruba (since 2010 the Joint Court of Justice of Aruba, Curaçao, Sint Maarten, and of Bonaire, Sint Eustatius and Saba). The court upheld the decision on 23 August 2005, stating that: "The Dutch marriage can be inscribed in the register. Since Aruba is part of the Kingdom of the Netherlands, it must comply with demands of the Kingdom." The ruling was based on Article 40 of the Charter for the Kingdom of the Netherlands, which states that civil certificates are valid throughout the Kingdom. Prime Minister Nelson O. Oduber reacted to the decision by declaring, "We give neither legal nor moral recognition to same-sex marriages." The government appealed the ruling to the Supreme Court of the Netherlands. On April 13, 2007, the Supreme Court declared that, in accordance with the Charter, all marriages contracted in the different parts of the Kingdom of the Netherlands, must be recognized in the other parts of the Kingdom as well. It ruled that the matter that same-sex marriage "[went] against Aruba's 'way of life'" was irrelevant to the issue. With this ruling, Aruba, as well as Curaçao and Sint Maarten, must recognize same-sex marriages performed in the Netherlands and the Caribbean Netherlands.

In July 2008, the Netherlands Antilles Court of First Instance in Curaçao ruled against the Antillean Office for Healthcare Facilities (BZV; Stichting Bureau Ziektekostenvoorzieningen, Ofisina pa Fasilidatnan di Kuido di Salú) for discriminating against a married lesbian couple. The court ruled that the office had acted illegally when it refused to register the couple in its health insurance scheme. The judgement of the ruling held that "the recognition of the marriage certificate also means the recognition of the legal consequences of the marriage certificate". The decision was overturned on appeal in June 2009 by the Common Court of Justice of the Netherlands Antilles and Aruba, which stated that although a same-sex marriage had to be registered as a marriage, this did not require organizations and agencies to give the same effect to them as other marriages. The court ruled similarly in June 2010 in a case involving the enrollment of a same-sex couple in a collective health insurance scheme, stating explicitly that enrollment to same-sex couples was only possible as enrollment was also open to non-married couples and thus excluding same-sex couples would constitute discrimination. If non-married couples were excluded, then there would be no obligation for same-sex couples to be included.

In the case of a joint divorce request of a same-sex couple in Aruba, a court ruled in 2008 that even though same-sex marriages were not mentioned in the Civil Code of Aruba, the partners constituted a married couple and as such should be allowed to divorce.

==== Discriminatory exclusion from marriage ====
On 27 May 2020, the Court of First Instance of Aruba ruled in Fundacion Orguyo Aruba (et al.) v. Country of Aruba that the government's refusal to recognize an alternative to marriage for same-sex couples was unlawful. The plaintiff Fundacion Orguyo Aruba appealed parts of the court decision on 6 July 2020, arguing that same-sex couples should be allowed to marry instead of having access to an alternative partnership institution. Registered partnerships were legalized in Aruba in September 2021, but the case continued. On 13 September 2021, the Court of First Instance of Curaçao found the exclusion of same-sex couples from marriage contrary to the equality principle of the Constitution of Curaçao in Human Rights Caribbean Foundation v. Country of Curaçao, but left it to the Parliament to address the unlawful discrimination. "There is no justification to deny same-sex couples the right to get married, certainly as long as there is no comparable legal system such as a registered partnership", the court said. The case was filed by a lesbian couple who had been together for more than 10 years and who sought the right to marry. The Human Rights Caribbean Foundation said the ruling was a "step forward" and an "asset to anyone who supports fundamental rights and is committed to equality". The government filed an appeal of the decision in June 2022, though Prime Minister Gilmar Pisas had announced immediately after the court ruling that it had plans to appeal.

The Joint Court of Justice of Aruba, Curaçao, Sint Maarten, and of Bonaire, Sint Eustatius and Saba ruled in both cases on 6 December 2022 that the same-sex marriage bans in Aruba and Curaçao were unconstitutional and that same-sex couples must be allowed to marry. The court ruled that "the fact that marriage is a centuries old tradition" did not justify differential treatment for same-sex couples, the argument that the legalization of same-sex marriages would "weaken marriage" was "objectively unjustified", and that registered partnerships were no acceptable alternative for same-sex couples as marriage carries "symbolic, emotional and intrinsic value" that offers "more protection and stability". The effect of the ruling was stayed until 7 March 2023 pending appeal to the Supreme Court of the Netherlands. State Secretary Alexandra van Huffelen said the ruling should also apply to Sint Maarten "as all three [islands] have the same legal framework". The Curaçao Government announced its intention to file an appeal on 13 December, followed by the Aruba Government on 24 February.

On 12 July 2024, the Supreme Court of the Netherlands upheld the lower court ruling, effectively legalizing same-sex marriage in Aruba and Curaçao with immediate effect. Solicitor General Gerbrant Snijders had earlier advised the Supreme Court to preserve the ruling of the Joint Court of Justice. Senator Miguel Mansur welcomed the court ruling, describing it as "an amazing victory which applies to Aruba, Curaçao, and by implication St. Maarten. Aruba progresses into a society with less discrimination, more tolerance, and acceptance." State Secretary for Kingdom Relations and Digitalisation Zsolt Szabó, on behalf of the Dutch Government, also welcomed the court ruling, saying, "This is very good news for the community. Of course the ruling still needs to be studied further, but I am happy to hear that we are one step closer – that everyone can simply marry the person he or she loves, regardless of gender." The ruling did not explicitly legalize same-sex marriage in Sint Maarten. Senator Melissa Gumbs told The Washington Blade that the ruling "could very well have some bearing on our situation here. I'm definitely looking into it. We're researching it to see what is the possibility, and also in touch with our friends in Aruba who are, of course, overjoyed with this ruling." Some religious groups said they were disappointed but "not surprised". In its ruling, the Supreme Court noted the religious objections of opponents of same-sex marriage, but stated that freedom of religion "does not go so far as imposing one's own religious norms and values on another." The first same-sex marriage in Curaçao occurred on 27 July 2024 in Otrobanda, Willemstad between Danika Marquez and Melinda Angel. The first same-sex marriage in Aruba took place during the last week of September 2024.

== Religious performance ==
The Catholic Church, the largest Christian denomination in Aruba, Curaçao and Sint Maarten, opposes same-sex marriage and does not allow its priests to officiate at such marriages. The Church organized a rally against same-sex marriage in Willemstad in July 2019, which Bishop Luis Antonio Secco attended. In December 2023, the Holy See published Fiducia supplicans, a declaration allowing Catholic priests to bless couples who are not considered to be married according to church teaching, including the blessing of same-sex couples. Donald Chambers, the General Secretary of the Antilles Episcopal Conference, said in response that: "The spontaneous blessings are simply gestures that provide an effective means of increasing trust in God on the part of the person who asks. Hence the title, Fiducia supplicans literally means asking for trust."

== Public opinion ==
Support for same-sex marriage in Aruba, Curaçao and Sint Maarten is significantly lower than in the country of the Netherlands. A 2019 Eurobarometer poll showed that 92% of people in the Netherlands proper thought same-sex marriage should be allowed throughout Europe, while 8% were opposed. For comparison, a 2021 Aruban poll showed that 49% of respondents supported registered partnerships for same-sex couples, and 46% supported same-sex marriage. Support was higher among young people (about 75% of people under the age of 30 expressed support), and those who had completed higher education.

== See also ==
- LGBT rights in Aruba
- LGBT rights in Curaçao
- LGBT rights in Sint Maarten
- Same-sex marriage in the Netherlands
- Same-sex marriage in Bonaire, Sint Eustatius and Saba
- Recognition of same-sex unions in the Americas
