= LGBTQ rights in the Sovereign Military Order of Malta =

Family rights
- Recognition of relationships: No

Lesbian, gay, bisexual, and transgender (LGBT) citizens and members of the Sovereign Military Order of Malta may experience challenges not experienced by non-LGBT citizens and members.

The Sovereign Military Order of Malta is a sovereign subject of international law that maintains diplomatic relations with a majority of sovereign states. It has over 13,000 members as of 2023. The Order's three principal officers are counted as citizens, with other members retaining their existing citizenship. The Order has its own constitution and issues its own diplomatic passports.

The Order adheres to Roman Catholicism and has taken conservative stances on social issues.

== Status ==
As of 2022, the Constitutional Charter of the Order states that it "carries out its charitable works for the sick, the needy and the refugees without distinction of religion, ethnicity, sex, origin and age". Neither the Constitutional Charter nor the Code of the Order explicitly mention sexual orientation.

Support for LGBT issues has affected people's ability to become members in the past. In 2009, former Washington, D.C. mayor Anthony A. Williams withdrew his application for Order membership after members protested his support for abortion and same-sex unions. In a 2010 publication of the Order's Journal of Spirituality, Baron Guglielmo Guidobono Cavalchini, Delegate of Lombardy, wrote that a member of the Order should not accept "the modern habit of living together without marriage or homosexual unions".

In a 2015 interview, Order patron from 2014 to 2023 Raymond Leo Burke (a largely ceremonial role) said that gay couples and divorced and remarried Catholics trying to live good and faithful lives were like "the person who murders someone and yet is kind to other people".

First Class members of the Order, known as Knights of Justice, must take a vow of chastity. The majority of other members are married.

== History ==
In Hospitaller Malta, governed by the Order of Malta's predecessor of the Knights Hospitaller between 1530 and 1798, there was harsh prejudice and laws towards those who were found guilty or spoke openly of being involved in same-sex activity. Sodomy was considered a common practice in Malta, and generally associated with Italians and Muslims. It was common for males attracted towards other males, including knights, who had to be supposedly celibate, to seek sexual favours with young looking men, identifiable effeminate males, and sometimes pederasty.

== See also ==
- List of LGBTQ rights articles by region
