= LGBTQ rights in Saba =

- Saba
- Legal status: Legal
- Military: LGBTQ people allowed to serve openly
- Discrimination protections: Discrimination based on "heterosexual and homosexual orientation" prohibited

Family rights
- Recognition of relationships: Same-sex marriage since 2012
- Adoption: Full adoption rights since 2012

Lesbian, gay, bisexual, transgender, and queer (LGBTQ) rights in Saba are very progressive by Caribbean standards. Saba forms part of the Caribbean Netherlands and is a special municipality of the Netherlands. Both male and female same-sex sexual activity are legal in Saba, with same-sex marriage and adoption being legal since 2012. In addition, discrimination on the basis of "heterosexual and homosexual orientation" is outlawed.

== Law regarding same-sex sexual activity ==
Same-sex sexual activity is legal in Saba.

== Recognition of same-sex relationships ==
Same-sex marriage in Saba became legal following the entry into force of a law enabling same-sex couples to marry on 10 October 2012.

The first same-sex marriage occurred on 4 December 2012 between Xiomar Gonzales Cedeno Ruis and Israel Ruis Gonzales from Aruba and Venezuela, respectively. A second couple from Curaçao married later that month.

== Discrimination protections ==
The Criminal Code BES (Dutch: Wetboek van Strafrecht BES), which applies to Saba and the islands of Bonaire and Sint Eustatius, criminalizes discrimination on the basis of "heterosexual and homosexual orientation". Article 144 provides for penalties varying from fines to two years' imprisonment.

In addition, Article 1 of the Constitution of the Netherlands applies to Saba. The article reads "All persons in the Netherlands shall be treated equally in equal circumstances. Discrimination on the grounds of religion, belief, political opinion, race or sex or on any other grounds whatsoever shall not be permitted."

The Netherlands Institute for Human Rights (College voor de Rechten van de Mens) is a research institute which "protects, advances and monitors human rights". The institute, established by law in 2010, works in the European Netherlands and also in the Caribbean Netherlands.

== Living conditions ==
Due to Saba's very small population, there are no gay venues or bars. Nevertheless, many businesses, hotels and restaurants on the island advertise as being "gay-friendly".

Saba is often described as "the gayest island in all the Caribbean". The island is known for its "live and let live" mentality, where discrimination against LGBTQ people is almost completely unheard of. In 2012, a same-sex couple living in Saba said that the island is perfect "for gay travellers who are not looking for a party atmosphere." There are several gay officials in Saba, including Carl Buncamper, a member of the Saba Island Council, and Glenn Holm, retired director of the Saba Tourism Bureau.

== Summary table ==
Same-sex sexual activity legal	Yes
Equal age of consent	Yes
Anti-discrimination laws in employment	Yes
Anti-discrimination laws in the provision of goods and services	Yes
Anti-discrimination laws in all other areas	Yes
Same-sex marriages	Yes (Since 2012)
Recognition of same-sex relationships	Yes (Since 2012)
Stepchild adoption by same-sex couples	Yes (Since 2012)
Joint adoption by same-sex couples	Yes (Since 2012)
LGBTQ people allowed to serve in the military	Yes (The Netherlands responsible for defence)
Right to change legal gender	Yes
Access to IVF for lesbian couples	
Commercial surrogacy for gay male couples	No (Banned for heterosexual couples as well)
MSMs allowed to donate blood	

== See also ==
- LGBTQ rights in the Netherlands
- LGBTQ rights in the Americas
- LGBTQ rights in Sint Eustatius
- LGBTQ rights in Bonaire
