= LGBTQ rights in Antarctica =

- Antarctica
- Legal status: Varies

Family rights
- Recognition of relationships: Same-sex marriage since 2016 (British Antarctic Territory)

Lesbian, gay, bisexual, transgender and queer (LGBTQ) people in Antarctica may experience different rights depending on their nationality.

As Antarctica has no resident human population, the human presence there is limited to short-term research or sporting expeditions. The Antarctic Treaty System provides that all legal rights in Antarctica are governed by those of the person's home nation, and do not change based on which country's Antarctic territorial claim the person happens to be present in at any given time.

== Same-sex marriage ==
Seven sovereign states – Argentina, Australia, Chile, France, New Zealand, Norway, and the United Kingdom – have made territorial claims in Antarctica, all of which recognize same-sex marriage. (Note: Recognition of same-sex marriage:) Practical options for achieving marriage may vary by location.

On 13 October 2016, an ordinance was proclaimed by Commissioner Peter Hayes that allowed people of the same sex to marry in the British Antarctic Territory. Marriages are solemnised by marriage officers, who are appointed by the Commissioner, at "any place that the marriage officer considers suitable", either within the territory or on board a ship within territorial waters.

The first same-sex marriage in the territory took place on 24 April 2022 between Eric Bourne and Stephen Carpenter on board RRS Sir David Attenborough near the Rothera Research Station on Adelaide Island. The first lesbian marriage occurred on 14 February 2023 between Sarah and June Snyder-Kamen at Bongrain Point, Pourquoi Pas Island.

It is possible (though rare) to marry in the French Southern and Antarctic Lands, and the civil code of France applies. France has recognized same-sex marriage since 2013.

== Public expression ==
Public expression of support for LGBTQ causes is not restricted, outside of national laws which may affect citizens of certain countries.

In 2016, advocacy group Planting Peace traveled across Antarctica with a pride flag as a symbolic gesture. The organization proclaimed Antarctica "the world's first LGBTQ-friendly continent". Polar Pride, an annual LGBTQ pride event held in Antarctica since 2018, is celebrated on November 18th. In 2022, transgender mountain climber Erin Parisi planted a transgender flag on the top of Vinson Massif, Antarctica's tallest peak. Also in 2022, what is believed to be the first all-LGBTQ expedition cruise to Antarctica took place.

== See also ==
- Antarctic Treaty System
- LGBTQ rights by country or territory
- List of LGBTQ rights articles by region
