= LGBTQ rights in Sint Eustatius =

- Sint Eustatius
- Legal status: Legal
- Military: LGBTQ people allowed to serve openly
- Discrimination protections: Discrimination based on "heterosexual and homosexual orientation" prohibited

Family rights
- Recognition of relationships: Same-sex marriage since 2012
- Adoption: Full adoption rights since 2012

Lesbian, gay, bisexual, transgender, and queer (LGBTQ) rights in Sint Eustatius are quite progressive by Caribbean standards. Sint Eustatius forms part of the Caribbean Netherlands and is a special municipality of the Netherlands. Both male and female same-sex sexual activity are legal in Sint Eustatius, with same-sex marriage, registered partnership, and adoption being legal since 2012. In addition, discrimination on the basis of "heterosexual and homosexual orientation" is outlawed.

== Law regarding same-sex sexual activity ==
Same-sex sexual activity is legal in Sint Eustatius.

== Recognition of same-sex relationships ==
Same-sex marriage in Sint Eustatius became legal following the entry into force of a law enabling same-sex couples to marry there on 10 October 2012.

The issue of same-sex marriage caused considerable controversy in Sint Eustatius. In 2010, the Island Council expressed unanimous opposition to the extension of same-sex marriage to Sint Eustatius. The same-sex marriage law being passed by the Dutch House of Representatives led to calls of "neo-colonialism".

== Discrimination protections ==
The Criminal Code BES (Dutch: Wetboek van Strafrecht BES), which applies to Sint Eustatius and the islands of Bonaire and Saba, criminalizes discrimination on the basis of "heterosexual and homosexual orientation". Article 144 provides for penalties varying from fines to two years' imprisonment.

In addition, Article 1 of the Constitution of the Netherlands applies to Sint Eustatius. The article reads "All persons in the Netherlands shall be treated equally in equal circumstances. Discrimination on the grounds of religion, belief, political opinion, race or sex or on any other grounds whatsoever shall not be permitted."

The Netherlands Institute for Human Rights (College voor de Rechten van de Mens) is a research institute which "protects, advances and monitors human rights". The Institute, established by law in 2010, works in the European Netherlands and also in the Caribbean Netherlands.

== Living conditions ==
Due to Sint Eustatius' very small population, there is no gay scene on the island, nor any specific gay bars or venues. A majority of St. Eustatians affiliate with Christian churches, with Methodism and Roman Catholicism being the two largest denominations. As such, societal perceptions of LGBTQ people tend to reflect Christian mores, and gay and lesbian locals "tend to keep a low profile".

== Summary table ==
Same-sex sexual activity legal	Yes
Equal age of consent	Yes
Anti-discrimination laws in employment	Yes
Anti-discrimination laws in the provision of goods and services	Yes
Anti-discrimination laws in all other areas	Yes
Same-sex marriages	Yes (Since 2012)
Recognition of same-sex relationships	Yes (Since 2012)
Stepchild adoption by same-sex couples	Yes (Since 2012)
Joint adoption by same-sex couples	Yes (Since 2012)
LGBTQ people allowed to serve in the military	Yes (The Netherlands responsible for defence)
Right to change legal gender	Yes
Access to IVF for lesbian couples	
Commercial surrogacy for gay male couples	No (Banned for heterosexual couples as well)
MSMs allowed to donate blood	

== See also ==
- LGBTQ rights in the Netherlands
- LGBTQ rights in the Americas
- LGBTQ rights in Bonaire
- LGBTQ rights in Saba
- Same-sex marriage in Bonaire, Sint Eustatius and Saba
