= LGBTQ rights in Bonaire =

- Bonaire
- Legal status: Legal
- Military: LGBTQ people allowed to serve openly
- Discrimination protections: Discrimination based on "heterosexual and homosexual orientation" prohibited

Family rights
- Recognition of relationships: Same-sex marriage since 2012
- Adoption: Full adoption rights since 2012

Lesbian, gay, bisexual, transgender, and queer (LGBTQ) rights in Bonaire are very progressive by Caribbean standards. Bonaire forms part of the Caribbean Netherlands and is a special municipality of the Netherlands. Both male and female same-sex sexual activity are legal in Bonaire, with same-sex marriage and adoption being legal since 2012. In addition, discrimination on the basis of "heterosexual and homosexual orientation" is outlawed.

== Law regarding same-sex sexual activity ==
Same-sex sexual activity is legal in Bonaire.

== Recognition of same-sex marriage ==
Same-sex marriage in Bonaire became legal following the entry into force of a law enabling same-sex couples to marry there on 10 October 2012.

The first same-sex marriage occurred on 18 May 2013 between an Aruban and a Venezuelan national.

== Discrimination protections ==
The Criminal Code BES (Dutch: Wetboek van Strafrecht BES), which applies to Bonaire and the islands of Saba and Sint Eustatius, criminalizes discrimination on the basis of "heterosexual and homosexual orientation". Article 144 provides for penalties varying from fines to two years' imprisonment.

In addition, Article 1 of the Constitution of the Netherlands applies to Bonaire. The article reads "All persons in the Netherlands shall be treated equally in equal circumstances. Discrimination on the grounds of religion, belief, political opinion, race or sex or on any other grounds whatsoever shall not be permitted."

The Netherlands Institute for Human Rights (College voor de Rechten van de Mens) is a research institute which "protects, advances and monitors human rights". The Institute, established by law in 2010, works in the European Netherlands and also in the Caribbean Netherlands.

== Living conditions ==
Due to Bonaire's small population of less than 20,000, there is no gay scene on the island. There are no specific gay venues or bars, though many do advocate as being "gay-friendly" and welcoming. There is, however, one gay association, known as EQ Bonaire. The group aims to "promote social reforms thereby achieving social acceptance of homosexuality".

Anti-gay discrimination is almost unheard of in Bonaire, but bullying and homophobia in schools is a big issue, and some local LGBTQ people have claimed that societal rejection, particularly directed at locals, not tourists, does exist.

== Summary table ==
Same-sex sexual activity legal	Yes
Equal age of consent	Yes
Anti-discrimination laws in employment	Yes
Anti-discrimination laws in the provision of goods and services	Yes
Anti-discrimination laws in all other areas	Yes
Same-sex marriages	Yes (Since 2012)
Recognition of same-sex relationships	Yes (Since 2012)
Stepchild adoption by same-sex couples	Yes (Since 2012)
Joint adoption by same-sex couples	Yes (Since 2012)
LGBTQ people allowed to serve in the military	Yes (The Netherlands responsible for defence)
Right to change legal gender	Yes
Access to IVF for lesbian couples	
Commercial surrogacy for gay male couples	No (Banned for heterosexual couples as well)
MSMs allowed to donate blood	

== See also ==
- LGBTQ rights in the Netherlands
- LGBTQ rights in the Americas
- LGBTQ rights in Sint Eustatius
- LGBTQ rights in Saba
- Same-sex marriage in Bonaire, Sint Eustatius and Saba
