= Accion 21 =

ACTION 21 ACCION 21
- Abbreviation: A21
- Leader: Miguel Mansur
- Chairperson: Ghislaine Hart
- Founders: Miguel Mansur; John Chemaly, Jr
- Founded: 18 December 2020
- Headquarters: L.G. Smith Blvd. 120, Oranjestad
- Ideology: Liberalism; Progressivism
- Political position: Centre
- Colours: Blue
- Parliament of Aruba: 0 / 21

Website
- accion21.com

ACCION 21 (English: Action 21, A21) is an Aruban political party in the centre with its ideology based in liberalism and progressivism. The party's name is derived from its desire to be the party of the 21st century, as well as the fact it contests the 21 seats of the Parliament of Aruba and its first electoral participation was 25 June 2021.

== History ==
The party was founded on 18 December 2020 by Miguel Mansur, economist and financial expert. The inspiration for the party originated with an article published 18 July 2020 by Mansur titled, "Status Aparte: The Road to Prosperity or Poverty?" which questioned the effect of Aruba's self-governing autonomy since 1 January 1986. Its emergence was spurred on by the corona crisis and the uproar over Aruba's autonomy and self-reliance in the context of the reform package supervised by the Caribbean Body for Reform and Development (COHO). The spearheads of the party are the reactivation of the economy, the restructuring of the financial situation of Aruba and government reforms. It stands for cooperation with the Netherlands and improving relations within the Kingdom of the Netherlands.

ACCION 21 participated with a list of fourteen candidates during the 2021 elections in Aruba. The party presented a progressive manifesto that championed free enterprise, fiscal reform, LGBT rights, open government, electoral law reform, abortion rights, euthanasia and legalization of cannabis. The party received 3,410 votes in the 2021 elections and one seat in the eleventh Parliament of Aruba. Shortly after the elections, three candidates withdrew from the party over internal disagreements. Party leader Miguel Mansur was the highest vote getter of all new political candidates. The party is currently part of the opposition and continues to advocate for closer ties with the Netherlands, fiscal reform and against abuse of power, corruption and nepotism.

Parliamentary faction leader, Miguel Mansur, introduced four private member bills; same-sex marriage, expansion of newborn parental leave, electoral reform and soft drugs legalization. In parliament the party also submitted more than eight hundred questions to ministers, eleven amendments and thirty-two motions. ACCION 21's faction was the most productive in the history of the country.

Following the collapse of the Wever-Croes II cabinet on September 9, 2024 early elections were called for December 6, 2024. ACCION 21 participated with a short list of nine candidates and received 2,203 votes, insufficient for parliamentary representation.

On April 9, 2025, the party council of ACCION 21 voted to dissolve the political party. The leader and board members offered their resignations following the disappointing election results and a new board had not been appointed thereafter. Therefore a majority of the party council supported dissolving the political organization and bringing to an end Aruba’s first liberal-progressive political party and the first party led by an openly LGBTQ leader.

== Election results ==
=== Aruba general elections ===
Election	Leader	Votes	%	Seats	+/–	Status
2021	Miguel Mansur	3,410	5.82 (#5)	1 / 21	New	Opposition
2024	Miguel Mansur	2,204	3.97 (#6)	0 / 21	▼1	Extra-parliamentary
