= LGBTQ rights in Western Australia =

- Western Australia (Australia)
- Legal status: Always legal for women; legal for men since 23 March 1990; Equal age of consent since 2002
- Gender identity: Change of sex on a birth certificate legally requires appropriate clinical treatment since 2025
- Discrimination protections: Yes, under state law since 2002 and federal law since 2013

Family rights
- Recognition of relationships: Same-sex marriage since 2017; De facto unions since 2002 (no civil unions or relationship register)
- Adoption: Yes, since 2002 and altristic surrogacy legal since 2026

Lesbian, gay, bisexual and transgender (LGBTQ) rights in Western Australia have seen significant progress since the beginning of the 21st century, with male sexual activity legal since 1990 and the state parliament passing comprehensive anti-discrimination law reforms in 2002. As part of those reforms, Western Australia was the first state within Australia to grant full adoption rights to same-sex couples in 2002, though the last to permit non-commercial surrogacy agreements involving same-sex couples within mid-August 2026 by a Supreme Court and Court of Appeals ruling. As of September 2026, Western Australia (plus Tasmania) are the only places left within Australia that still has not explicitly criminally prohibited conversion therapy practices on individuals.

== Laws regarding sexual activity ==
In December 1989, the Parliament of Western Australia passed the Law Reform (Decriminalisation of Sodomy) Act 1989 which decriminalised private sexual acts between two people of the same sex and went into effect on 23 March 1990. The Act was however, one of the strictest gay law reform acts in Australia, as it made the age of consent for homosexual sex acts between males 21, whilst lowering the heterosexual age of consent to 16. The Act also created new homosexual-oriented offences under state law, including making it a crime for a person to "...promote or encourage homosexual behaviour as part of the teaching in any primary or secondary educational institutions..." or make public policy with respect to the undefined promotion of homosexual behaviour.

LGBT people in Western Australia achieved equalisation of consent ages in 2002 via the Acts Amendment (Gay and Lesbian Law Reform) Act 2002, which also repealed the laws with respect to promotion of homosexual behaviour in public policy and in educational institutions.

=== Historical convictions expungement ===
Western Australia was one of the last Australian jurisdictions to pass a law allowing individuals to apply to have historical homosexual convictions or charges expunged from their criminal records.

Following homosexual decriminalisation in 1990, attempts to reform the law only gained traction in the mid-2010s. In April 2016, the Law Society of Western Australia submitted a detailed proposal to the state Attorney-General, recommending a scheme be implemented to allow individuals who have been convicted of an historical homosexual offence apply to have that conviction be expunged. Prior to the 2017 state election, both major parties in Western Australia discussed the prospect of expunging consensual homosexual sex crimes, with the opposition Labor Party pledging to implement such a scheme if elected and the incumbent Coalition government stating it would consider the proposal. After comfortably winning the election, the McGowan Labor government introduced expungement legislation (the Historical Homosexual Convictions Expungement Bill 2017) to the Legislative Assembly on 1 November 2017. The legislation requires those applying for an expunged record to satisfy a mandatory test to ensure their conduct constituted a historical homosexual offence. The consent of all parties and respective ages at the time is taken into account and family members of deceased victims are able to apply for an expungement on their behalf. Labor leader and Premier, Mark McGowan, also issued a formal apology in Parliament to the LGBTIQ community in Western Australia for the anti-homosexuality laws of the past. The bill passed the Assembly on 22 February 2018 and passed the Legislative Council with amendments attached later that year on 23 August. The Legislative Assembly approved of the council's amendments on 11 September 2018 and the bill received royal assent on 18 September 2018. The law went into effect on 15 October 2018.

Expungement or spent conviction schemes are legally available within all other Australian jurisdictions.

== Conversion therapy ban ==
No laws within Western Australia currently ban conversion therapy. The government made an announcement formally that a bill would only be introduced, after the March 2025 state election. WA is the only mainland state to still legally allow these practices.

== Transgender rights ==
Western Australian law recognises a transgender person's change of sex. Prior to 2012 the state required the person to undergo sterilisation before approving a change in sex classification. This requirement was overturned when the High Court of Australia ruled, in the 2012 case of AB v Western Australia, that two transgender men who had undergone mastectomies and hormone treatment did not need to undergo sterilisation to obtain a gender recognition certificate. In August 2018, the government introduced legislation to the Parliament of Western Australia that repealed the requirement that one must be "unmarried" for a change of sex to registered on one's birth certificate. The bill passed the lower house on 20 November 2018 and passed the upper house on 12 February 2019. The bill received royal assent on 19 February 2019 and commenced on 19 March 2019.

=== Transgender prison policy ===
In November 2020, it was reported that transgender prisoners can be housed according to their own gender identity for strict health and safety reasons under recently implemented policies – so long as they commit no sexual offences on their criminal record.

=== Suicide of a 15 year old transgender teenager ===
In April 2021, a suicide of a 15 year old transgender teenager in Perth caused mass outrage within the Western Australia LGBTIQ+ community – that has called for archaic WA legislation regarding sex or gender on a birth certificate to be reformed immediately.

=== Western Australia Supreme Court ===
In October 2021, in a legal first precedent within Australia, a family completely lost custody of their own children by a court order – for continuing abusing their own transgender child.

=== Abolishing the WA Gender Reassignment Board ===
In September 2024, the Births, Deaths, Marriages Registration Amendment (Sex or Gender Changes) Act 2024 was passed by both chambers to formally abolish and repeal the WA Gender Reassignment Board. The act allows male, female, "indeterminate/intersex" and nonbinary options on an individual's birth certificate and to change sex on a birth certificate requirement is "appropriate clinical treatment" sign off by a doctor, nurse or psychologist only once a year – no sexual reassignment surgery is required. The act received with royal assent on 26 September 2024. The recent act went into effect on 30 May 2025.

A $195 fee to change sex on a birth certificate within WA has to be paid non-refundable, and up to 4 weeks expected waiting according to the WA BDM website.

== Intersex rights ==
In March 2017, representatives of Androgen Insensitivity Syndrome Support Group Australia and Organisation Intersex International Australia participated in an Australian and Aotearoa/New Zealand consensus "Darlington Statement" by intersex community organizations and others. The statement calls for legal reform, including the criminalisation of deferrable intersex medical interventions on children, an end to legal classification of sex, and improved access to peer support.

== Recognition of same-sex relationships ==
=== De facto unions ===
Western Australia is one of two jurisdictions in Australia (the other being the Northern Territory) not to offer relationship registries and official domestic partnership schemes to same-sex or de facto couples. Labor Party leader Mark McGowan said the party would consider introducing civil unions during the 2017 state election, though this never eventuated following the national legalisation of same-sex marriage later that year (see below). West Australian family law has provided same-sex and other couples with de facto unions since 2002. In order for a same-sex couple to be officially recognised as a de facto union, or for de facto same-sex couples to legally remedy divorce proceedings, the Family Court of Western Australia is charged with permitting that recognition or divorce. These state laws recognise same-sex couples rights to next of kin recognition, partner's state superannuation and compensation in the event of partner's death, amidst a whole host of other things. Same-sex couples in Western Australia and their relationships are also covered by federal law, ensuring that same-sex de facto partners are provided with most of the same entitlements as married partners.

=== Relationship declaration programs ===
Relationship declaration programs have been introduced by two local governments in Western Australia, namely the City of Vincent and the Town of Port Hedland. The City of Vincent's scheme, introduced in 2012, was discontinued in 2018. Port Hedland's scheme was adopted in 2015 and rescinded in 2021.

=== Same-sex marriage ===
Same-sex marriage became legal in Western Australia, and in the rest of Australia, in December 2017, after the Federal Parliament passed a law legalising same-sex marriage. Prior to this, in September 2015, the West Australian Parliament passed a motion calling on the federal parliament to have a conscience vote on same-sex marriage legislation.

== Adoption and parenting rights ==
=== Adoption ===
Same-sex couples are permitted to adopt in Western Australia as a result of the Acts Amendment (Gay and Lesbian Law Reform) Act 2002 which in turn amended the Adoption Act 1994 to include same-sex couples as eligible to adopt a child and include provisions for same-sex step-parent adoptions.

Since April 2018, all Australian jurisdictions legally allow same-sex couples to adopt children.

=== Assisted reproduction ===
The 2002 Act is extensive in that also amends several other Acts to enable same-sex couples have access to assisted reproductive technology including in-vitro fertilisation and artificial insemination (see Parts 4 and 11 of the Act). The Act further stipulates (in Part 4, Section 26) that the de facto female partner of a pregnant woman conceived via assisted reproductive technology is automatically considered as the second legal parent of that child for the purpose of state law, once the birth has occurred. A same-sex couple who utilises artificial insemination or in-vitro fertilisation treatment together (i.e. both parties present as a couple throughout the treatment) are able to have both names on the birth certificate once the child is born.

=== Surrogacy ===
With respect to surrogacy rights, Western Australia (like all jurisdictions in Australia) bans commercial surrogacy and until 2025 was the only state within Australia to ban altruistic or non-commercial surrogacy for singles and same-sex couples, Prior to the law change in 2025, the Surrogacy Act 2008 defined eligible surrogacy clients as "...2 people of opposite sexes who are married or in a de facto relationship with each other". The McGowan government announced that an independent review of the restriction as well as other aspects of assisted reproduction legislation, to be overseen by Associate Professor Sonia Allen, would be undertaken in 2018. In August 2018, a bill was introduced in the state's Parliament to allow altruistic surrogacy for same-sex couples and single people. The bill passed the Legislative Assembly on 9 October 2018. The bill was considered by the Legislative Council over several sitting days in early 2019. In that time, conservative Liberal Party MLC Nick Goiran staged a marathon filibuster against the legislation. Goiran spoke continuously for over 20 hours of parliamentary time spread over several months, delaying further debate on the bill and saying he wished for other parliamentarians to consider a report on the issue released by the government the previous month. Under the rules of the council in operation at the time, the only way to stop Goiran would be to remove the bill from the daily business agenda. On 10 April 2019, the Council agreed to Goiran's motion to refer the bill to parliament's Legislation Committee. The committee issued its report in late June. Segments of the report argued the proposal could discriminate against women, due to the existing requirement for women to have medical reasons to access surrogacy, finding the only way to avoid this would be either by applying the same rule to men or removing the medical reasons requirement for women. In December 2019, Health Minister Roger Cook stated the government would consider amendments to the bill in response to the committee's findings. The bill failed to pass the parliament prior to the 2021 election. On 18 August 2021 the McGowan government tabled its response to the Allan Review of the Human Reproductive Technology Act 1991 and Surrogacy Act 2008, contending that it would continue to advocate for a change to the law as recommended by Allan and introduce new legislation to Parliament during its current term of government.

Despite the government's pledge, the surrogacy laws remained unaltered by the parliament and came under renewed scrutiny by the media in 2024. Sonia Allan, who conducted a review of the state's surrogacy laws in 2018, stated she was "extremely disappointed" by the government's inaction on the issue. Health Minister Amber-Jade Sanderson, whose Labor government commanded majorities in both chambers of the parliament, stated the government was "absolutely committed to this legislation" and would "introduce a bill as soon as possible". A state election took place in March 2025, whereupon Labor retained government though lost its majority in the Legislative Council, and the Assisted Reproductive Technology and Surrogacy Bill 2025 was introduced to the parliament on 13 August 2025. The bill was passed by the Legislative Assembly on 18 September 2025. The legislation, which enables non-commercial surrogacy arrangements to take place involving same-sex couples and single people, passed the Assembly by 44 votes to 4. Despite several lawmakers abstaining from the vote, only four lawmakers, former Liberal leader Libby Mettam, Liberal MP Liam Staltari, Nationals leader Shane Love and Nationals MP Lachlan Hunter, opposed passage of the bill. The bill proceeded to the Legislative Council, where it eventually passed with amendments attached by 22 votes to 12 on 3 December 2025. That same day the Assembly considered and approved of the Council's amendments, and the bill received royal assent from Governor Chris Dawson on 18 December 2025. The legislation will come into effect on a day to be fixed by proclamation, though at the time of the legislation's passage Health Minister Meredith Hammat advised there would be an 18 month implementation period. In mid-August 2026, two men as a couple ongoingly challenging the 2008 surrogacy law (that only allows heterosexual couples to have surrogacy agreements) won the case within both the WA Supreme Court and the WA Court of Appeals - stating it clearly breached “2013 federal anti-discrimination laws on the basis of both sexual orientation and sex under section 109 of the Australian Constitution”.

== Discrimination and harassment protections ==
In August 2022, it was formally announced that the Western Australian government is going to reform, update and overhaul the Equal Opportunity Act 1984 – to explicitly include both "gender identity and sex characteristics" and to also repeal the exemption, that legally allows LGBTIQ teachers and students being discriminated against within religious schools. Sexual orientation is already explicitly included since 2002. In April 2024, it was formally announced by the government that no bill would be introduced on reforming the WA Equal Opportunity Act – until after the March 2025 state election. In 2026, an extensive Public Order Bill 2026 was introduced and passed the lower house - but yet to pass the upper house. The bill is to explicitly criminally ban harassment based on “sex, sexual orientation, gender identity and sex characteristics”.

Western Australia passed the state Equal Opportunity Act in 1984. This legislation failed to include sexual orientation amongst a list of attributes designed to protect people from discrimination. This was changed in 2002, when the Acts Amendment (Gay and Lesbian Law Reform) Act 2002 amended the 1984 Act to include sexual orientation, protecting LGB people in areas of employment, education, accommodation and the provision of goods, services and facilities, amongst a host of other aspects of public life. These laws technically provide less protections for transgender Western Australians, who are classified in the Equal Opportunity Act and by the Equal Opportunity Commission of Western Australia as 'Gender History'; providing protections for those who have reassigned gender as certified under the Gender Reassignment Act 2000. In October 2018, the McGowan Labor government revealed it would submit the Equal Opportunity Act to a review of the state Law Reform Commission, the announcement coming after McGowan had said he was "personally uncomfortable" with religious schools discriminating against gay students and teachers.

Federal law protects LGBT and intersex people in Western Australia in the form of the Sex Discrimination Amendment (Sexual Orientation, Gender Identity and Intersex Status) Act 2013.

=== Schools and LGBTI students ===
The Safe Schools anti-LGBTI bullying program was rolled out in schools across the country under a federal initiative to combat anti-LGBTI school bullying, which research suggested was prevalent across Australian schools. However, in 2015 and 2016 the Safe Schools program faced criticism from social conservatives for allegedly indoctrinating children with "Marxist cultural relativism" and age-inappropriate sexuality and gender concepts in schools, while others criticised the Marxist political views of Roz Ward, a key figure in the program.

After the federal Turnbull government announced that it would not renew funding for the program when it ran out in mid-2017, Western Australia's political parties proposed different approaches in the run-up to the 2017 election. The Liberal Party announced it would allow the program to lapse if it retained government. The Western Australian branch of the Australian Labor Party confirmed it would fully fund the program in Western Australia if it won office, while the Western Australian Greens support the continuation of the program. The 2017 election resulted in victory for the Australian Labor Party led by Mark McGowan and the defeat of outspoken Safe Schools opponents Peter Abetz and Joe Francis, among others. The election outcome was welcomed by LGBTI advocates, who also called on the incoming McGowan Government to encourage more Western Australian schools to adopt the program, which provides training resources for teachers.

=== Margaret Court court case ===
In October 2020, Margaret Court a 1970s tennis legend and religious pastor sued the WA government and lotterywest and went to the WA equal opportunity commission – because they refused to fund or give money to her charity Victory Life Church in Perth to feed the homeless people, due to her "outdated or archaic biblical views on marriage".

== Politics ==
The Labor Party and Greens are generally supportive of LGBTI rights, while the Liberal Party has tended to be less so. In contrast to the WA Liberals and their eastern National Party counterparts, the National Party of Western Australia is socially progressive and largely supports LGBTI rights, with former leader Brendon Grylls acknowledging the gay and lesbian community in his maiden speech and the WA National party conference passing a 2006 motion in favour of civil unions.

In 2002, Attorney-General Jim McGinty of the Labor Party and Greens Western Australia Leader Giz Watson introduced a package of comprehensive LGBTI law reform, which included allowing same-sex adoption, parentage rights for lesbian couples with children, allowing same-sex couples to access the more cost-effective Family Court of Western Australia to resolve their disputes and equalising the age of consent at 16 years for both heterosexual and homosexual sex acts. As a result, Western Australia became the first Australian state to allow LGBT adoption and the first place in Australia where a same-sex couple adopted a stranger's child, which occurred in 2007.

The 2002 McGinty-Watson reforms were strongly opposed by the Western Australian Liberals at the time, who were then led in opposition by Colin Barnett. In their 2002 policy "Family First – Defining the Difference", the Liberals promised to repeal the reforms and raise the homosexual age of consent from 16 to 18 years of age. The Liberals did not form government until 2008, and did not change the LGBTI laws once in office. Before their defeat at the 2017 state election a number of Liberal politicians, including Joe Francis and Peter Abetz, were outspoken in their opposition to LGBT rights such as same-sex marriage and anti-LGBT bullying programs.

At the 2017 election, the incoming McGowan ALP Government promised it would continue funding for the Safe Schools anti-bullying program, introduce a conviction expungement scheme to clear historical offences for legalised sexual conduct and (in the then-absence of same-sex marriage under federal law) consider establishing civil unions under state law.

== Christmas Island and the Cocos (Keeling) Islands ==
Laws from Western Australia also apply to the external territories of Christmas Island and the Cocos (Keeling) Islands, subject to change by the Australian government.

== Summary table ==
Same-sex sexual activity legal	Yes (since 1990 for men; always for women)
Equal age of consent	Yes (since 2002)
Anti-discrimination state laws for sexual orientation	Yes (since 2002)
Anti-discrimination state laws for gender identity or expression	Yes / No (protection for "gender history" only; since 2002)
Requires appropriate clinical treatment on a birth certificate to change sex	Yes (since 2025)
Hate crime laws include both sexual orientation and gender identity	No / Yes (federal law since 2025, no state laws on hate crimes)
Laws against LGBT vilification	No
Gay sex criminal records expunged	Yes (since 2018)
Gay panic defence abolished	Yes
Recognition in state law of same-sex couples as de facto couples	Yes (since 2002)
Step adoption by same-sex couples	Yes (since 2002)
Joint adoption by same-sex couples	Yes (since 2002)
Automatic IVF/artificial insemination parenthood for female partners	Yes
Access to IVF for lesbians	Yes
Access to altruistic surrogacy for male same-sex couples	Yes (since 2026, legislation to codify the ruling goes into legal effect from late-2027)
Conversion therapy officially banned	No
Same-sex marriages	Yes (since 2017)
MSMs allowed to donate blood	Yes (must be monogamous since 2026)

== See also ==
- Transgender rights in Australia
- Intersex rights in Australia
- LGBT rights in Australia
- Same-sex marriage in Australia
- Australian Marriage Law Postal Survey
