= Miguel Mansur =

Aruban politician (born 1977)

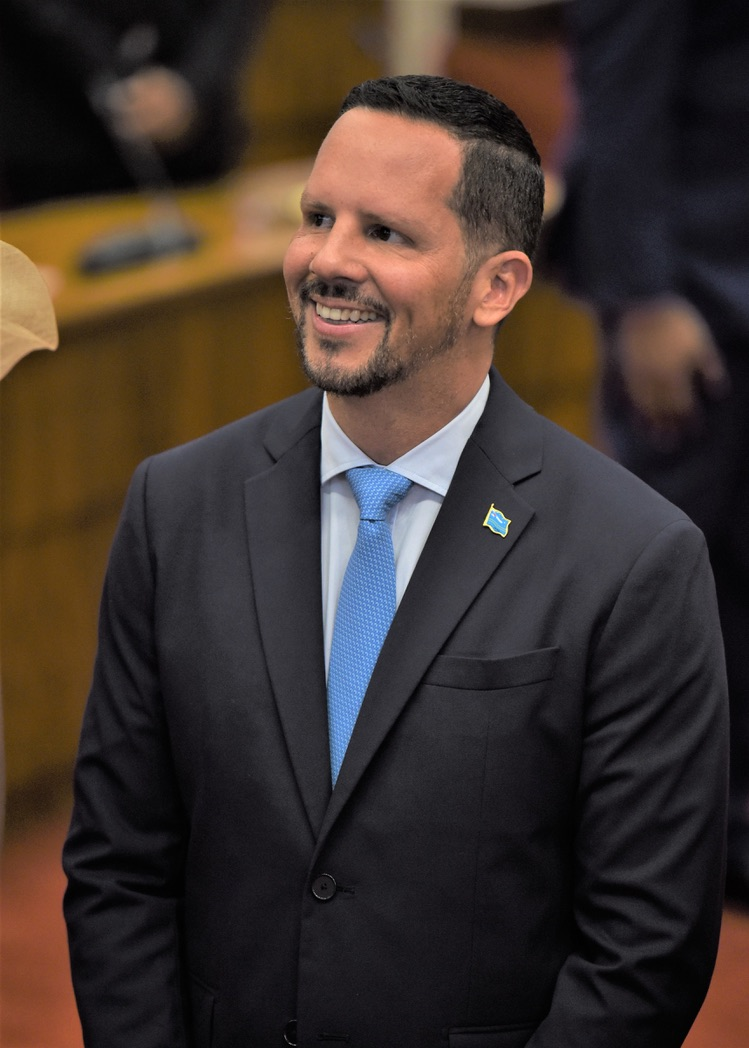
- Parliament of Aruba, 8 July 2021

Leader of the ACCION 21
- In office 18 December 2020 – 9 April 2025

Leader of the ACCION 21 in the Parliament of Aruba
- In office 8 July 2021 – 7 January 2025

Member of the Parliament of Aruba
- In office 8 July 2021 – 7 January 2025

Personal details
- Born: Miguel José Mansur; 15 July 1977 (age 49) Oranjestad, Aruba
- Party: ACCION 21
- Education: Tufts University

Miguel José Mansur (born 15 July 1977) is an Aruban politician of the ACCION 21 party. He was elected a Senator of the Parliament of Aruba in the elections of 25 June 2021. He was the top vote getter amongst new candidates and fifth overall of 176 candidates participating. He is the first openly LGBTQ Aruban party leader.

== Early life and education ==
Mansur was born to Madeline Arends, former Miss Tivoli 1967, the daughter of Lieutenant Governor (Gezaghebber) Eric "Tushi" Arends and M.E.I. "Betsy" Arends whose family emigrated from the Netherlands in the 1700s. His father Miguel José Mansur, Sr., is an affluent businessman from a well-known Aruban merchant family of Lebanese descent and former President of the Chamber of Commerce. He is the grandson of Elias Mansur, an important local businessman of the 20th century whose family settled in Aruba since 1902 and who was condecorated Officer in the Order of Orange-Nassau. His paternal grandmother was Damia S. Mawad of a prominent Zgharta noble family and cousin to assassinated Lebanese President René Moawad. He is the nephew of former Minister of Economic Affairs and Tourism E.F. "Don" Mansur.

His primary education was in the English language at Seroe Colorado School, later renamed International School of Aruba. At the age of fourteen he went to boarding school at the prestigious Institut Le Rosey in Switzerland where he graduated with the Prix D'Excellence in 1995. He studied economics and international relations in the United States where he graduated from Tufts University. Prior to returning to his native Aruba in October 2020, Mansur resided in Miami, Escazú, Madrid, Ibiza, Sydney, London, Amsterdam and Boston.

== Political career ==
An investor turned politician inspired by an article he published during the coronavirus pandemic, "Status Aparte: The Road to Prosperity or Poverty?" on 18 July 2020. Mansur critically assessed Aruba's performance since gaining self-governing autonomy, known as Status Aparte, on 1 January 1986 by comparing real economic growth with growth in the national debt. The poor performance of successive Aruban governments since 2001 prompted his entry into politics, thereby founding the liberal progressive ACCION 21 party on 18 December 2020. Following the elections of 25 June 2021, he swore in as a Senator of Aruba on 8 July 2021 and served as the Leader of the parliamentary faction of ACCION 21 in the Parliament of Aruba.

Prior to his entry into politics he was President of Capitable, a Florida limited liability company that manages investments in the self-service laundry industry and real estate.

== Political positions (2021 Aruban general election) ==
=== Economy and finance ===
Mansur campaigned heavily on fiscal reform and is a strong proponent of adopting a Singapore model of economic development based on territorial taxation. He is also a strong advocate of reducing the size and costs of the public sector and increasing labor flexibility.

=== Humans rights ===
As the first openly gay party leader in Aruba, Mansur and his party unequivocally advocate for equal rights for the LGBT community including marriage equality.

=== Immigration ===
His party campaigned for the regularization of the roughly 20,000 undocumented persons in Aruba and their integration into the formal economy and society.

=== Netherlands ===
He campaigned for closer relations to the Netherlands and is a supporter of the Landspakket or country agreement between Aruba and the Netherlands.

=== Social policy ===
His stances are very progressive and his party was the first to include abortion and euthanasia as part of its platform along with the legalization of recreational cannabis.

== Member of the Parliament of Aruba (2021–2025) ==
Mansur was elected to the Parliament of Aruba (Staten) following the 2021 general election as the sole representative and parliamentary leader of the newly founded party ACCION 21. From the opposition, his parliamentary work focused on legislative initiatives; private member's bills, motions and amendments. He also exercised critical parliamentary oversight, including over eight hundred written questions to ministers, challenging the government on the secretive Eagle LNG deal, the corruption scandal at Arubahuis etc.

=== Private member’s bills ===
During his term, Mansur introduced or co-introduced four private member’s bills, including initiatives relating to marriage equality, parental leave, electoral reform, and soft-drug policy. These initiatives included:

- Same-sex marriage (openstelling huwelijk) – Mansur’s faction announced and pursued a draft law to introduce same-sex marriage in Aruba beginning in 2022, later submitted with co-initiators from other parties. Parliamentary consideration in 2024 resulted in tied votes (10–10), preventing passage at that time. In July 2024, the Supreme Court of the Netherlands upheld earlier rulings, making same-sex marriage legal in Aruba with immediate effect.
- Expansion of maternity/paternity leave – In early 2024, ACCION 21 submitted a proposal to expand maternity and childbirth leave from 12 to 16 weeks, alongside an expansion of paternity leave to the highest standard currently offered in the Kingdom of the Netherlands.
- Electoral reform – In 2024, Mansur submitted a proposal aimed at modernizing Aruba’s electoral law. The changes include introducing the right of vote for Arubans overseas, primary elections for list support, term limits for ministers and members of parliament, improved residual seat allocation and preferential voting reform for candidates on a political list to enter parliament. (kieswet/kiesverordening).
- Soft-drug policy – In December 2024, prior to stepping down, Mansur submitted a proposal to change Aruba's drug law framework in relation to "soft drugs," which generated public controversy and debate.

=== Oversight activity: questions, amendments, and motions ===
Mansur and ACCION 21 made extensive use of parliamentary oversight tools, including written questions to ministers. The party maintained an online repository of parliamentary questions, ministerial replies, motions, and amendments filed by Mansur during the 2021–2025 term. Summaries published about the party describe the faction as submitting more than 800 parliamentary questions, alongside 11 amendments and 32 motions, and characterize this output as unusually high by local standards. Mansur submitted motions calling for the regularization of the undocumented population, accepting the RAft (Rijkswet Aruba financieel toezicht) and questioned the annual structural increases of Afl. 100 million in government expenditure.

ACCION 21’s 2021–2025 program emphasized modernization of governance and increased transparency, including proposals to strengthen publication practices for parliamentary and government documents and to improve public access to information. The party’s focus on parliamentary questions and oversight activity was presented as consistent with these goals of strengthening democratic accountability and transparency. The introduction and support of a same-sex marriage initiative was also framed by Mansur’s faction as part of a broader agenda of equal rights and non-discrimination. The electoral modernization proposal was another of the party's campaign promises as was the 'soft drugs' legalization bill. The motions to regularize the undocumented population and accept the RAft affirm the party's commitments, particularly regarding fiscal discipline and better relations with the Netherlands.

== Post 2024 Aruban general election ==
Following the general election of 6 December 2024, ACCION 21 failed to achieve enough votes for parliamentary representation ending Mansur's tenure in Parliament. Mansur received 1,825 personal votes making him the eighth vote-getter of 139 candidates, which is slightly less than in 2021 but still higher than the preferential vote minimum of 1,347 in the 2024 elections. Mansur and the party council of the ACCION 21 decided to dissolve the liberal progressive party in April 2025 following the election upset. The former leader of ACCION 21 will remain active in politics but is currently not committed to any political organization.

== Electoral history ==
Electoral history of Miguel Mansur
Year	Body	Party	Pos.	Votes	Result		Ref.
Year	Body	Party	Pos.	Votes	Party seats	Individual	Ref.
2021	Parliament of Aruba	ACCION 21	1	2,019	1	Won	
2024	Parliament of Aruba	ACCION 21	1	1,825	0	Lost	
