= Same-sex marriage in Bonaire, Sint Eustatius and Saba =

Same-sex marriage has been legal in Bonaire, Sint Eustatius and Saba since 10 October 2012, the effective date of legislation passed by the States General of the Netherlands enabling same-sex couples to marry. The Caribbean Netherlands was the first jurisdiction in the Caribbean to legalise same-sex marriage, and was followed a few months later by French territories, including Guadeloupe and Martinique, in May 2013.

Saba and Bonaire have been named among the best marriage destinations for same-sex couples in the Caribbean.

== Legal history ==
=== Background ===
In 1954, the islands of Aruba, Curaçao, Bonaire, Sint Maarten, Saba, and Sint Eustatius became a constituent country of the Kingdom of the Netherlands, known as the Netherlands Antilles. Aruba seceded from the Netherlands Antilles in 1986 to become its own separate constituent country within the Kingdom. The Netherlands Antilles was dissolved in 2010, with Curaçao and Sint Maarten joining Aruba in becoming autonomous constituent countries, while Saba, Bonaire and Sint Eustastius became special municipalities of the Netherlands proper. Voters in Saba and Bonaire had voted for integration into the Netherlands in referendums in 2004, while Sint Eustastius had voted against integration in 2005. Under the law of the Netherlands Antilles, same-sex couples were not permitted to marry, despite same-sex marriage having been legalised in the Netherlands proper in 2001.

=== Passage of legislation in 2012 ===
Recognition of same-sex unions in the Lesser Antilles and Puerto Rico Same-sex marriage Unregistered cohabitation Island subject to IACHR advisory opinion No recognition of same-sex couples Constitutional ban on same-sex marriage Same-sex sexual activity illegal but penalties not enforced

As the States General of the Netherlands was debating legislation to establish the Caribbean Netherlands, MPs Johan Remkes and Ineke van Gent introduced an amendment to open marriage to same-sex couples on the islands. The government of Prime Minister Mark Rutte announced it preferred to negotiate the change with the islands first. At the time, the Civil Code of the Netherlands Antilles defined marriage as only "exist[ing] between a man and a woman". In 2007, politicians from the three islands called on the government not to introduce same-sex marriage. A deputy from the Bonaire Patriotic Union said, "We have no problem registering the marriages of gays. But we don't want same-sex marriages." Meanwhile, a deputy from the Windward Islands People's Movement stated that "Saba has always been very tolerant towards homosexuals. We have no problem with that. But marriage, that's something else." The issue was particularly controversial on the island of Sint Eustatius, with many Christian islanders opposing the principle of the law because of the perceived "neocolonialism" of the Netherlands imposing such a law on its overseas municipalities. The Sint Eustatius Island Council also passed a resolution opposing same-sex marriage in 2010.

The law, known as the Implementation Act Public Entities Bonaire, Sint Eustatius and Saba, was passed by the Parliament, and received royal assent by Queen Beatrix on 17 May 2010. It took effect on 10 October 2010. This established the Caribbean Netherlands, and incorporated Saba, Sint Eustatius and Bonaire into the Netherlands proper as special municipalities. The islands were given a civil code, and Netherlands Antilles legislation was gradually replaced with Dutch legislation over the following years. The Second Amendment Act Public Bodies Bonaire, Sint Eustatius and Saba, in force since 1 January 2011, amended the Civil Code to insert two clauses ensuring recognition of marriages and registered partnerships performed abroad, including in the Netherlands, and providing these unions with the same treatment as the marriages and partnerships of opposite-sex couples. It was expected that provisions permitting same-sex marriages to be solemnised on the islands would come into effect within two years.

Legislation to legalise same-sex marriage on the islands took effect on 10 October 2012. Article 1:30 of the Civil Code states:

- in Dutch: Een huwelijk kan worden aangegaan door twee personen van verschillend of van gelijk geslacht.
- in Papiamento: Un matrimonio por tuma luga entre dos personanan di diferente o di mesun sekso.

(A marriage can be entered into by two persons of different or of the same sex.)

The first same-sex marriage in Saba was performed in The Bottom on 4 December 2012 between Cedeno Xiomar Gonzalez, an Aruban, and Israel Ruiz Pinto, from Venezuela, who were both residents of Aruba. The first same-sex wedding in Bonaire was performed in May 2013 in Kralendijk between Jean Ardley Baiz and Norbert Miguel Torrealba, also an Aruban-Venezuelan couple. The first public same-sex marriage in Sint Eustatius took place in December 2019 in Oranjestad between Walter Hellebrand and Christopher Russell, though several same-sex couples had already married in Sint Eustatius in private ceremonies prior to this.

== Marriage statistics ==
Saba has been named one of the best marriage destinations for same-sex couples in the Caribbean. By 2018, 22 same-sex couples had married on the island. Bonaire has also been named among the best marriage destinations for same-sex couples in the Caribbean.

== Religious performance ==
The Catholic Church, the largest Christian denomination in Bonaire and Saba, opposes same-sex marriage and does not allow its priests to officiate at such marriages. In December 2023, the Holy See published Fiducia supplicans, a declaration allowing Catholic priests to bless couples who are not considered to be married according to church teaching, including the blessing of same-sex couples. Donald Chambers, the General Secretary of the Antilles Episcopal Conference, said in response that: "The spontaneous blessings are simply gestures that provide an effective means of increasing trust in God on the part of the person who asks. Hence the title, Fiducia supplicans literally means asking for trust." In Sint Eustatius, where Protestant groups account for the majority of the population, Christian leaders were vocal in their opposition to same-sex marriage during parliamentary discussions on the marriage bill.

== See also ==
- LGBT rights in Bonaire
- LGBT rights in Sint Eustatius
- LGBT rights in Saba
- Same-sex marriage in the Netherlands
- Same-sex marriage in Aruba, Curaçao and Sint Maarten
- Recognition of same-sex unions in the Americas
