= LGBTQ rights in the Netherlands =

- Location of the Netherlands (dark green) – in Europe (light green & dark gray) – in the European Union (light green) – [Legend]
- Legal status: Legal since 1811, equal age of consent since 1971
- Gender identity: Transgender people are allowed to change legal gender without surgery or hormone therapy, but a specialist's letter of permission given after a prolonged period of talks is required.
- Military: LGBTQ people allowed to serve openly
- Discrimination protections: Sexual orientation, gender identity, gender expression and sex characteristics protections; Sexual orientation only formally added to the Constitution since 2023

Family rights
- Recognition of relationships: Registered partnerships since 1998; Same-sex marriage since 2001
- Adoption: Full adoption rights since 2001

Lesbian, gay, bisexual, transgender, and queer (LGBTQ) rights in the Netherlands are among the most advanced in the world. Same-sex sexual activity was legalized in 1811 after France invaded the country and installed the Napoleonic Code, erasing any remaining sodomy laws. No more sodomy laws were enacted after the country received independence. In 1911 a law was enacted under the influence of Christian parties in the parliament which banned same-sex sexual activity under the age of 21, while the age of consent for heterosexuals remained 16. In 1946 the Centre for Culture and Recreation was founded, advocating for LGBTQ rights and challenging this policy. An age of consent equal with that of heterosexual activity was put in place in 1971. During the late 20th century, awareness surrounding homosexuality grew and society became more tolerant of gay and bisexual people. The changes eventually led to homosexuality's declassification as a mental illness in 1973 and a ban on discrimination based on sexual orientation in the military. The Equal Treatment Act 1994 bans discrimination on account of sexual orientation in employment, housing, public accommodations, and other areas. This was extended in 2019 to include discrimination based on gender identity, gender expression and sex characteristics. After the country began granting same-sex couples registered partnerships benefits in 1998, the Netherlands became the first country in the world to legalize same-sex marriage in 2001. Same-sex joint and stepchild adoption are also permitted, and lesbian couples can access IVF as well.

The Netherlands has become one of the most culturally liberal countries in the world, with recent polls indicating that more than 90% of Dutch people support same-sex marriage. Amsterdam has frequently been named one of the most LGBTQ-friendly cities in the world, famous for its many accommodations specifically pertaining to the LGBTQ community, including its many gay bars, bathhouses, hotels, and venues as well as Pink Point, which provides LGBTQ-friendly information and souvenirs, and the national Homomonument, which was completed in 1987 and was the first monument in the world to commemorate homosexuals who were persecuted and killed during World War II. Since February 2023, protections against discrimination on the basis of sexual orientation and disability were formally added to the Netherlands Constitution. In addition, the country appointed its first openly gay prime minister, Rob Jetten, in February 2026.

== Law regarding same-sex sexual activity ==
Same-sex activity has been legal since 1811. The age of consent is set at 16 regardless of gender and sexual orientation, having been equalised in 1971.

=== History ===
Between 1730 and 1811, sodomy was a capital crime in the Dutch Republic, resulting in widespread panic throughout the Netherlands and the persecution of hundreds of homosexuals. After the French invaded and installed the Napoleonic Code in 1811, all laws against same-sex sexual activity between consenting adults in private were repealed. After the Dutch received independence in 1813, no new sodomy laws were enacted. The Christian-based political parties enacted Article 248bis of the Penal Code in 1911, which raised the age of consent for same-sex sexual activity to 21 whilst the age of consent for heterosexual activity remained at 16. Laws citing public indecency were also often used against homosexuals.

During World War II, the Nazis introduced Paragraph 175 into Dutch law, which prohibited any same-sex sexual activity once again. The law was repealed after the end of the war.

During the mid-20th century, society's attitude towards homosexuality, with psychiatrists and clergy beginning to view it less critically. In 1971, the age of consent for same-sex sexual activity was equalised. Article 248bis was repealed. In 1973, homosexuality was no longer treated as a mental illness, which paved the way for allowing gay people to serve in the military.

== Recognition of same-sex relationships ==
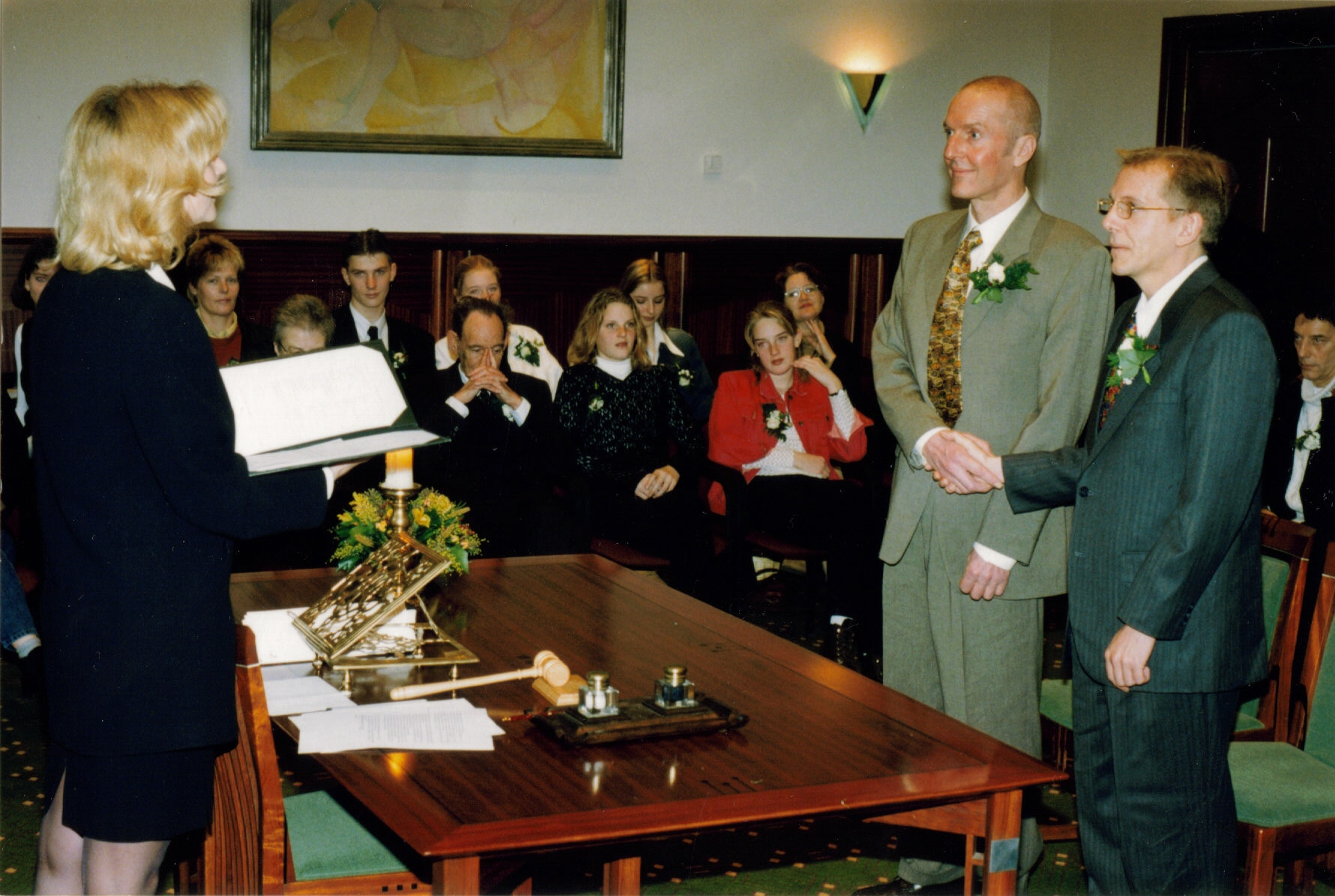
Two men marrying in Amsterdam, in the first month after the possibility to marry was opened to same-sex couples (2001)

Dutch law began granting same-sex couples registered partnerships on 1 January 1998 as an alternative for marriage. Registered partnerships are also allowed for opposite-sex couples. The Netherlands became the first country in the world to legalize same-sex marriage in 2001, with the law coming into effect on 1 April. That day, Job Cohen, the Mayor of Amsterdam, married four same-sex couples after becoming a registrar specifically to officiate at the weddings. The bill had passed the House of Representatives by 109 votes against 33. Although same-sex marriages can be performed in the European territory of the Netherlands and the Caribbean territories of Bonaire, Sint Eustatius and Saba, same-sex marriages performed in Aruba, Curaçao and Sint Maarten, which are constituent countries of the Kingdom of the Netherlands, are not officially valid. As a result of article 40 of the Charter for the Kingdom of the Netherlands, same-sex marriages performed anywhere else in the Kingdom must be recognized in all territories, however, they are not required to guarantee equal treatment of same-sex couples with valid marriage licenses.

Before 2014, civil servants could refuse to marry same-sex couples as long as the municipality ensured that other civil servants were available to solemnize the marriage. In 2014, a law was passed that made it illegal for all marriage officiants to refuse their services to same-sex couples.

In October 2021, it was clarified and investigated that "any memberships of the Dutch Royal Family" legally can enter into same-sex marriage in effect since 1 April 2001 – without losing any titles, rights and/or privileges whatsoever.

== Adoption and parenting ==
Same-sex adoption was legalized alongside same-sex marriage in 2001, which includes joint and stepchild adoption. The Dutch Parliament also began allowing same-sex couples to adopt children overseas in 2009. Lesbian couples can get access to IVF treatment, as well as parentage rights for their children. Assisted insemination in case of infertility is covered by health insurance, whether concerning single women, opposite-sex couples or lesbian couples.

Altruistic surrogacy is legal in the Netherlands. Commercial surrogacy is illegal, regardless of sexual orientation. Although altruistic surrogacy is legal, there are only a few hospitals that undertake these arrangements, and there are very strict rules. This makes a lot of couples seek their treatment outside the Netherlands. In 2019, at least two IVF clinics in the Netherlands started offering surrogacy services to same-sex couples; one in Leiderdorp helps with the fertilisation of the surrogate mother's eggs, while a second in Gemert-Bakel works with the family members of the couple for a better genetic match.

== Discrimination protections ==
The Dutch Parliament enacted the Equal Treatment Act 1994 (Dutch: Algemene wet gelijke behandeling; West Frisian: Algemiene wet gelikense behanneling) in March of that year, which bans (among others) discrimination on the grounds of sexual orientation in employment, housing, and both public and private accommodations. Before March 2019, gender identity, gender expression and sex characteristics were not specifically mentioned, but discrimination was nonetheless banned. There had been cases where the Dutch Institute for Human Rights ruled that transgender people were protected under the clause of "gender". On 16 January 2017, a bill was introduced to explicitly add sex characteristics, gender identity and gender expression to the list of anti-discrimination grounds. The bill was approved by the House (127–23) on 3 July 2018 and by the Senate (64–11) on 12 March 2019. In addition, a motion was passed (123–27) that requested the Rutte Government to investigate whether it is possible to replace the term "heterosexual or homosexual orientation" with the term "sexual orientation" to include all orientations, including bisexual and asexual people.

Recently, a loophole was fixed in the Equal Treatment Act 1994. Before this, government-financed religious schools were not allowed to fire or deny promotions to teachers on the "single fact" of someone's sexual orientation. However, some schools had interpreted this so that they could fire a teacher for behaviours outside of the facility that went against the ethos of the school. This resulted in the termination of a teacher in 2005 for being in a same-sex relationship. This was called de enkelefeitconstructie ("the single fact construction"). A bill that removed the "single fact" rule and ensured that LGBTQ students and teachers cannot be fired because of their sexual orientation was debated in Parliament in 2014. On 27 May 2014, this bill was approved by the vast majority of the House of Representatives (141–9) and on 10 March 2015 the bill was approved by the Senate (72–3). It went into full effect on 1 July 2015.

A proposal to add disability and sexual orientation as prohibited grounds for discrimination to Article 1 of the Constitution of the Netherlands was approved in the House of Representatives on 30 June 2020 (124 to 26) and in the Senate on 9 February 2021 (58 to 15). The measure required approval by the House and Senate by a two-thirds majority following the March 2021 election. On 15 March 2022, the House of Representatives passed the same proposal a second time by a vote of 123 to 25 with 2 members not present. It moved to the Senate for its second vote. On 17 January 2023, the bill was approved by the vast majority of the Senate (56–15) and awaited royal assent. Since February 2023, both sexual orientation and disability were formally added to the Netherlands Constitution.

A 2018 survey by Statistics Netherlands showed that 11.4% of LGBTQ youth were confronted with online bullying and harassment. This was more than twice as often as heterosexual young people. A survey by the knowledge institute Movisie showed that there were an estimated 900 to 2000 homeless LGBTQ youth in the Netherlands in 2020. LGBTQ young people were three times as likely to be homeless than young heterosexual people. Movisie said that "LGBTQ youth are often rejected at home and have difficulties accepting themselves".

== Transgender and intersex rights ==
The Dutch parliament voted in favour of the law establishing the right of transgender people to change their legal gender in 1984 and 1985. The law required individuals to undergo gender-affirming surgery and forced sterilization in order to use this right. Top surgery is available to patients older than 16 in The Netherlands.

In December 2013, the Dutch Parliament overwhelmingly approved a bill allowing transgender people to legally change their gender on birth certificates and other official documents without undergoing sterilization and gender-affirming surgery. The law took effect in 2014. Additionally, transgender people are allowed to serve openly in the military.

Since 1993, it has been possible to state on a birth certificate "sex cannot be determined" when the sex of a newborn baby is unclear. On 28 May 2018, the District Court of Limburg ruled in favour of a Dutch citizen who wished to be recognized as a "third gender" on their birth certificate. Although current laws do not provide for the possibility to be registered as a "third gender", the judge did grant the request for the wording "sex cannot be determined". The court urged lawmakers to provide more options than the current generic "male" (man) and "female" (vrouw) boxes, because the absence of a gender-neutral option is a violation of private life, the right to self-determination and personal autonomy for both transgender and intersex persons. The Dutch Government is currently examining the legal consequences of the ruling. The plaintiff in the case, Leonne Zeegers, received a Dutch passport with an "X" sex descriptor in October 2018. Despite this, as no legislation has been enacted yet, it currently remains a matter for the courts to decide if an individual should receive an "X" designation for gender. The second person to receive an "X" sex marker, Nanoah Struik, did so in July 2019. According to the Social and Cultural Planning Office of the Netherlands, there are an estimated 80,000 intersex people in the Netherlands.

In December 2019, the House of Representatives unanimously adopted a motion presented by Vera Bergkamp and Kirsten van den Hul calling on the Dutch Government to investigate the extent of intersex medical interventions in the Netherlands.

In February 2020, a class-action lawsuit was filed against the Dutch Government over previous sterilisation requirements for transgender individuals. The plaintiffs are also calling on the state to offer compensation to the individuals who were sterilised under the law. A formal apology was issued by the state in December 2020, and a compensation scheme for transgender victims of sterilization (€5,000 for each of the estimated 2,000 victims) was implemented that same month.

In July 2020, it was announced that the Netherlands was considering abolishing gender markers on official identity documents from 2025.

In November 2020, the Dutch cabinet officially apologized for the fact that between 1985 and 2014, transgender people who wanted to change their legal gender were forced to undergo surgery and sterilization. In November 2021 the cabinet announced that individuals who underwent surgery and sterilization because of the 1985 law would become eligible to receive compensation.

In July 2021, a district court granted and allowed a gender X birth certificate to a "self-identified non-binary individual". All non-binary people may now use a gender X birth certificate.

In December 2021, a court ruling dropped psychologist certification for non-binary people to use the X gender marker in passports.

The Dutch Ministry of Health, Welfare and Sport publishes guidelines recommending the use of puberty blockers in transgender adolescents of at least Tanner Stage II with informed consent and approval of an endocrinologist. This guideline, published in 2016, is endorsed by the following Dutch medical organizations:

- Nederlands Internisten Vereniging (Dutch Internists Association)
- Nederlands Huisartsen Genootschap (Dutch Society of General Practitioners)
- Nederlands Instituut van Psychologen (Dutch Institute of Psychologists)
- Nederlandse Vereniging voor Kindergeneeskunde (Dutch Association for Pediatrics)
- Nederlandse Vereniging voor Obstetrie & Gynaecologie (Dutch Association for Obstetrics & Gynaecology)
- Nederlandse Vereniging voor Plastische Chirurgie (Dutch Association for Plastic Surgery)
- Nederlandse Vereniging voor Psychiatrie (Dutch Psychiatry Association)
- Transvisie (Transvision, a patient organization for transgender patients)

In May 2023, then Dutch Ambassador to the U.S. André Haspels reaffirmed the Netherlands' global commitment to LGBTQ and intersex rights during a showcase of the Amsterdam Rainbow Dress at the Lincoln Memorial.The 52-foot dress, featuring flags from 68 countries where same-sex relations remain criminalized, symbolizes solidarity and advocacy. Haspels emphasized the importance of continued dialogue, acknowledging progress needed both in the U.S. and the Netherlands, particularly in areas such as intersex rights, legal gender recognition, and banning conversion practices.

In July 2026, the Dutch Health Board released a review on gender-affirming care for trans youth with updated guidance. The review continued to recommend gender-affirming medical care for use in transgender youth. The review cited the harms of delaying treatment and noted that scientific research shows improvements in mental health and that the regret rate is low.

== Conversion therapy ==
In September 2025, a bill banning conversion therapy passed the House of representatives with a simple majority. The Senate passed the bill on 16 June 2026, and it was ratified on 8 September 2026.

Organizations offering conversion therapy, the pseudoscientific practice of attempting to change an individual's sexual orientation or gender identity using psychological or spiritual interventions, in the Netherlands are not eligible for subsidies. In addition, since June 2012, conversion therapies have been blocked from coverage by healthcare insurance.

On 17 May 2019, after television programme Ewout & homogenezing, which was broadcast on RTL 5 on 23 April 2019, showed that several organisations, including Dutch Pentecostal and Baptist groups, were offering conversion therapy, the Labour Party (PvdA) and Democrats 66 (D66) requested an investigation into the allegations. In May 2019, the Minister of Health, Welfare and Sport, Hugo de Jonge, informed the House of Representatives that he saw no need to ban conversion therapies in the Netherlands, adding that he was not planning to commission an "in-depth and independent investigation" into the extent to which young people in the Netherlands are exposed to such practices.

On 22 May 2019, the House of Representatives adopted a motion to investigate the extent of gay conversion therapy in the Netherlands. The motion was supported by D66, GroenLinks (GL) and the PvdA, while the ChristenUnie (CU), the Reformed Political Party (SGP) and the Party for Freedom (PVV) voted against. On 29 May, the House of Representatives adopted another motion; this time calling on the Minister of Justice and Security, Ferdinand Grapperhaus, to create a legislative proposal to explicitly ban conversion therapy. Parliamentarians called such 'treatments' "indigestible" and "harmful". The motion was proposed by the People's Party for Freedom and Democracy (VVD), and was supported by the VVD themselves, D66, GL, PvdA and the Socialist Party (SP), while the Christian Democratic Appeal (CDA), CU, PVV, SGP and Forum for Democracy (FvD) voted against. The adopted motion does not provide for a timetable.

== Health and blood donation ==
In the Netherlands, as in many other countries, men who have sex with men (MSM) were previously not allowed to donate blood. The MSM population in developed countries tends to have a relatively high prevalence of HIV/AIDS infection, so a blanket ban was enforced until 2015. In April 2012, the House of Representatives voted on a motion that would make an end to this ban and would make sexual risk behaviour the criteria for blood donation; in response the government asked the blood bank Sanquin and Maastricht University to investigate whether men who have sex with men should be allowed to donate blood. The report presented on 6 March 2015 showed that there were medical scientific grounds to adjust the donor selection policies around men who had sex with other men. This took away the main argument of safety risks. On 28 October 2015, the Ministry of Health, Welfare and Sport announced that a 12-month deferral on donating blood would replace the existing lifetime ban. In February 2019, the Sanquin blood bank shortened this period to 4 months.

On 1 August 2019, the Dutch Government introduced full coverage of PrEP and other related care for gay and bisexual men. The drug is available at all Municipal Health Services (GGD) offices in the country, and can drastically decrease the risk of contracting HIV. In addition, the move would save an estimated €33 million on HIV treatments.

Since September 2021, gay men within monogamous relationships in the Netherlands can legally donate blood without any waiting periods. Gay men within non-monogamous relationships have to still legally undergo a 4-month waiting period.

== Uganda relations ==
In May 2023, the Netherlands immediately stopped cooperation, political relationships and trade with Uganda following the passage of the Anti-Homosexuality Act.

== Public opinion ==
According to a poll conducted in May 2013, Ifop indicated that 85% of the Dutch population supported same-sex marriage and adoption. A European Union member poll conducted in 2015 indicated that 91% of the Netherlands supported same-sex marriage, which was the highest amount of support during that time. In the Caribbean territories of the Kingdom, the citizens are mostly religious, resulting in larger opposition to same-sex marriage in comparison to the European territory.

The 2019 Eurobarometer showed that 97% of Dutch people believed gay and bisexual people should enjoy the same rights as heterosexual people, and 92% supported same-sex marriage.

The 2023 Eurobarometer found that 94% of Dutch people thought same-sex marriage should be allowed throughout Europe, and 94% agreed that "there is nothing wrong in a sexual relationship between two persons of the same sex". It also found that 91% of Dutch people agreed that "transgender people should have the same rights as anyone else," and 84% of people thought that "transgender persons should be able to change their civil documents to match their gender identity."

Acceptance of homosexuality among adolescents decreased between 2021 and 2025, as shown in the Dutch Health Behaviour in School-aged Children (HBSC) Study from Utrecht University and the Trimbos Institute. The study showed that the percentage of boys in secondary education who had a positive attitude towards homosexuality fell from 40% to 22% and among girls in secondary education, it fell from 78% to 51%.

== Living conditions and civil society ==
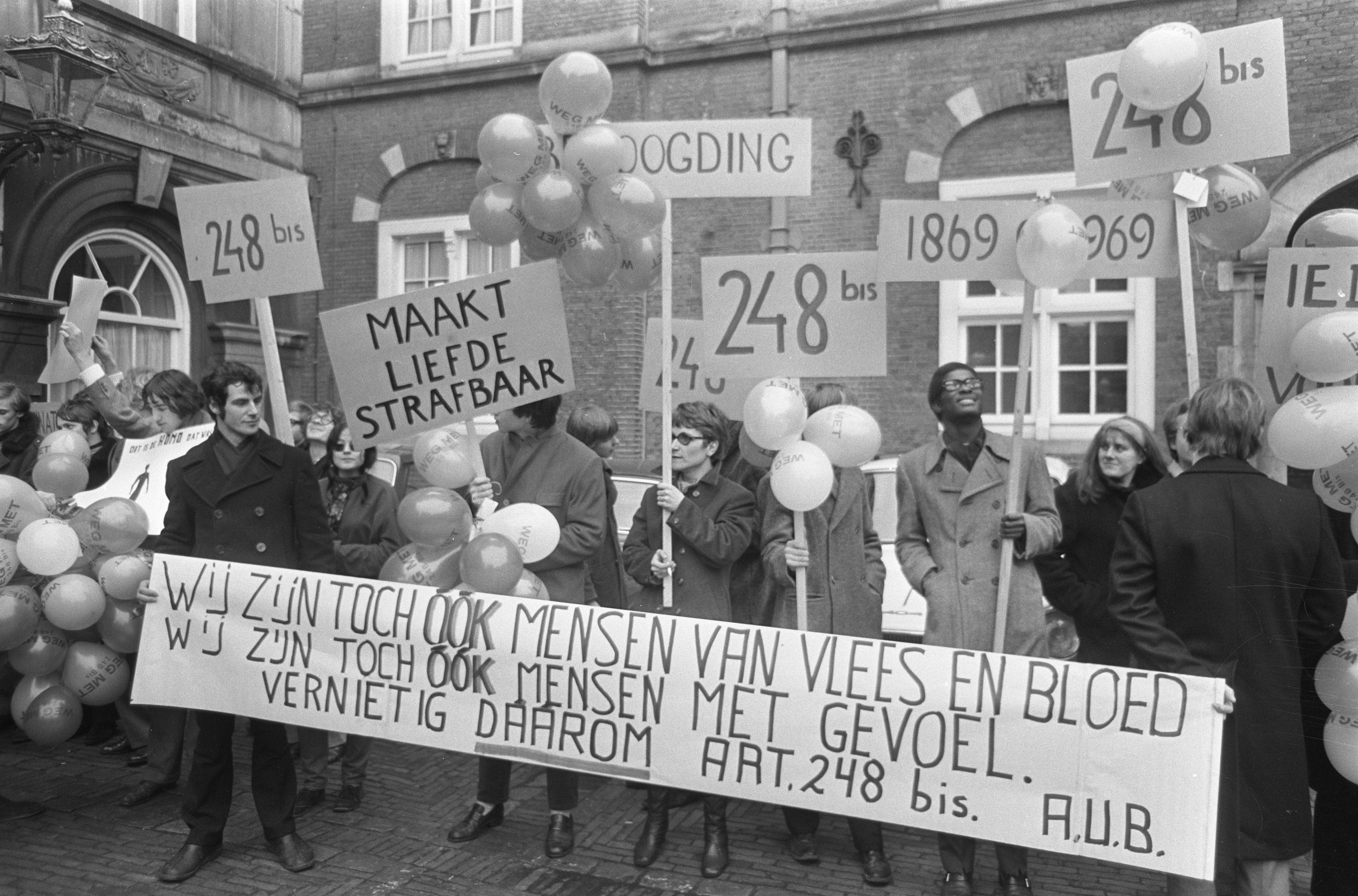
The first gay demonstration in the Netherlands, Binnenhof, 21 January 1969

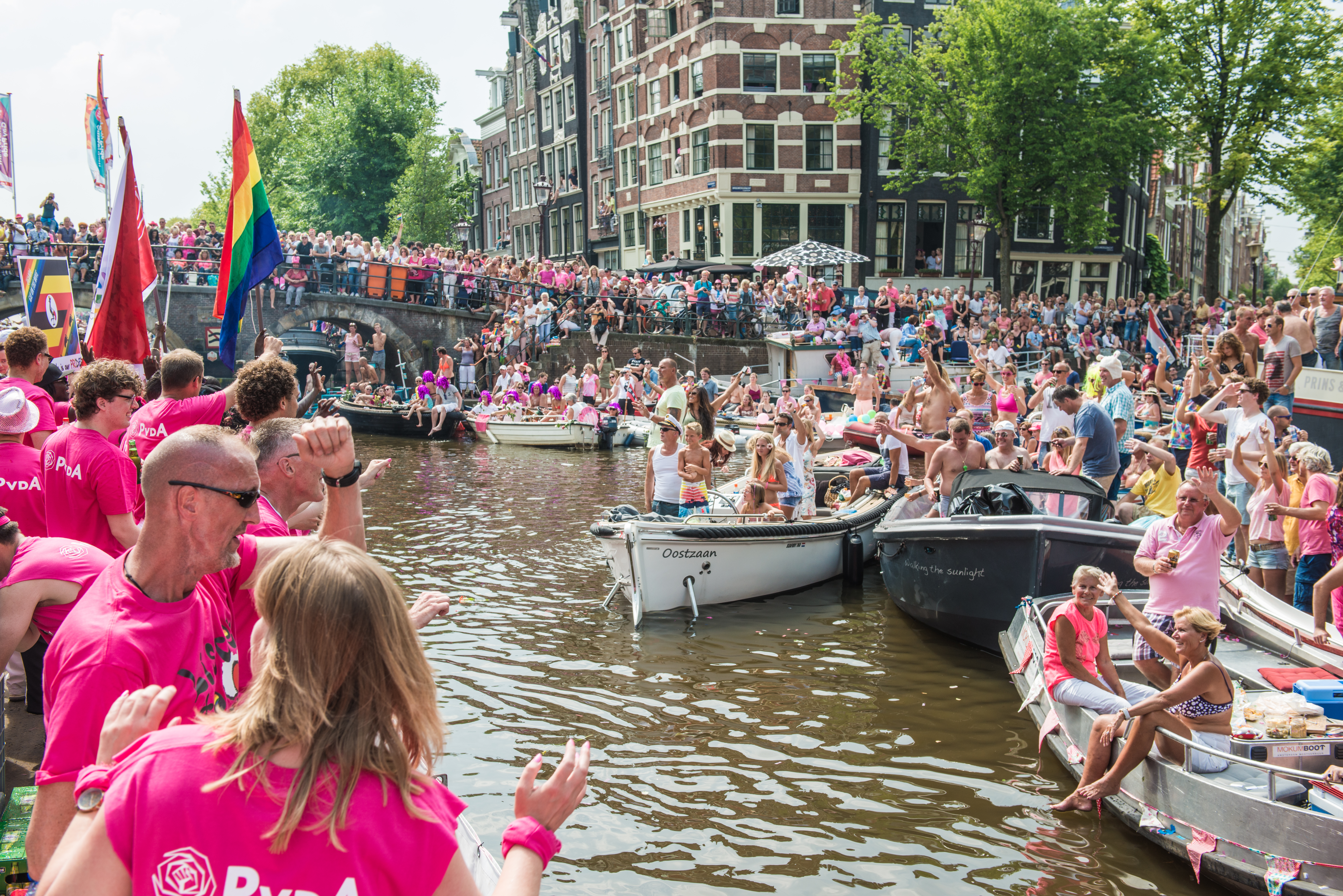
Amsterdam Gay Pride 2014

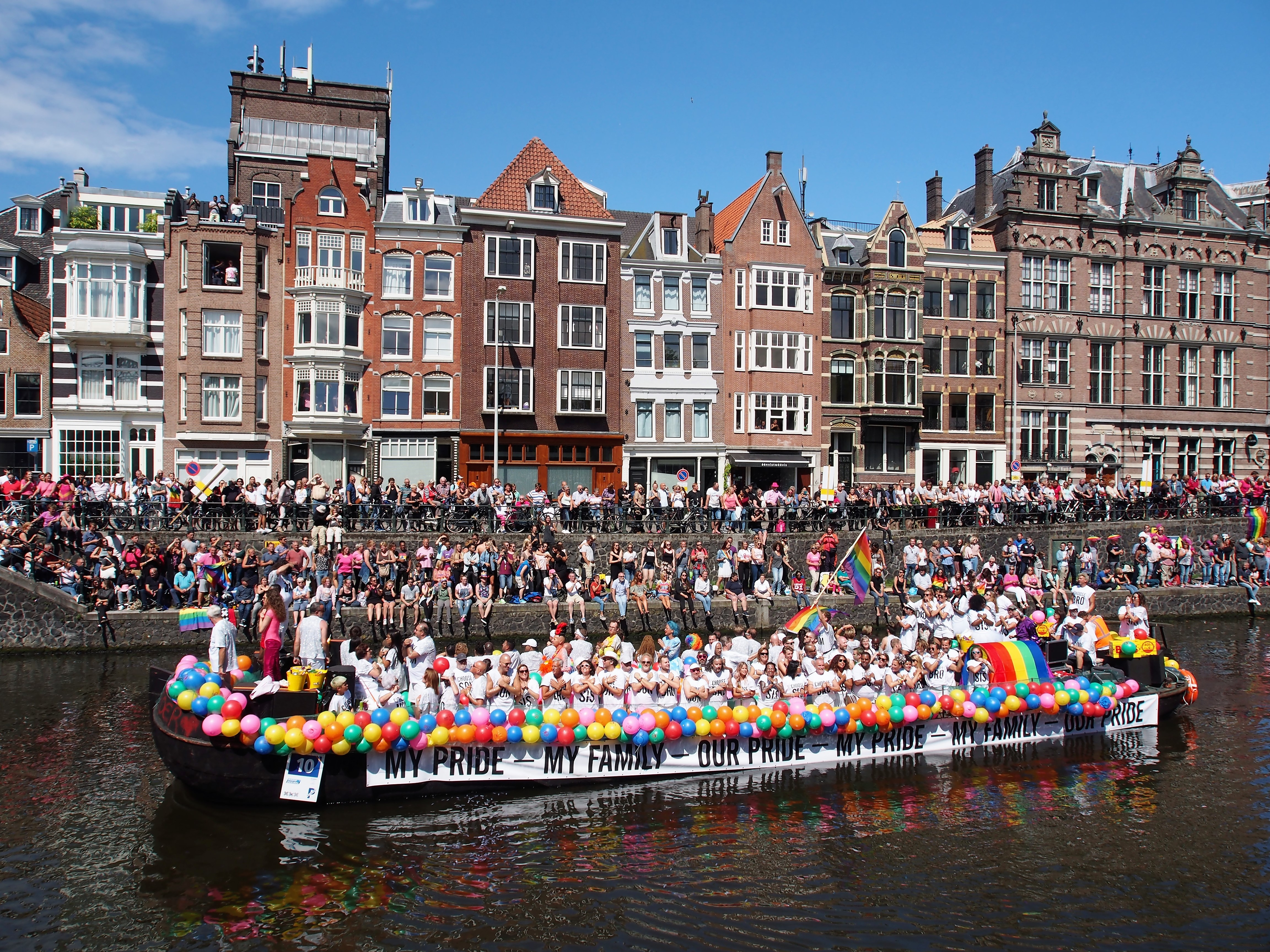
Amsterdam Pride attracts thousands of people every year. It includes a parade of boats, as shown here in 2017.

The first gay bars in Amsterdam opened in the early 20th century. The oldest place that still exists today is Café 't Mandje, which was opened in 1927 by Bet van Beeren. The gay magazine Wij ("We") also published during this period. Many of these bars and establishments were shut down during the German occupation of the Netherlands, and with the introduction of Paragraph 175 into Dutch law same-sex sexual activity was criminalized. Following the end of the war, the Shakespeare Club was established, with the goals of social emancipation and offering culture and recreation for gay and lesbian people. It changed its name to Cultuur- en Ontspanningscentrum in 1949 and eventually in 2017 to COC Nederland. It is the oldest existing LGBTQ organization in the world. During the sexual revolution of the 1960s, many gay bars and clubs opened in a number of cities, and societal acceptance of LGBTQ people began to grow. The first gay and lesbian protest in the Netherlands took place on 21 January 1969 at the Binnenhof. In 1977, LGBTQ groups began organising annual marches under the name Pink Saturday (Roze Zaterdag). In 1987, the world's first gay memorial, the Homomonument, commemorating LGBTQ people persecuted during the Nazi period, was opened in Amsterdam.

The Netherlands has frequently been referred to as one of the most gay-friendly countries in the world, on account of its early adoption of LGBTQ rights legislation and tolerance perception. Amsterdam has been referred to as one of the most gay-friendly cities in the world by publications such as The Independent. The annual gay pride festival has been held in Amsterdam every year since 1996. The festival attracts several hundred-thousand visitors each year and thus one of the largest publicly held annual events in the Netherlands. Amsterdam has also been the host city of the Europride twice, in 1994 and 2016. The latter attracted more than 560,000 visitors. Besides Amsterdam, there are also visible gay scenes in Rotterdam, Utrecht, The Hague and Scheveningen, with several bars, saunas and clubs catering to gay clientele.

A 2013 survey showed that 93% of Dutch people believed homosexuals should live their lives as they wish, with just 4% believing that homosexuality should be rejected. Other opinion polls have also found high levels of public and societal acceptance of LGBTQ people, again leading many to call the Netherlands one of the most gay-friendly countries in the world. According to a 2016 report from the Netherlands Institute for Social Research, most Dutch people have a positive attitude towards homosexuality. Only 7% of the Dutch viewed homosexuality and bisexuality negatively and 10% viewed transgender people negatively. However, 3.8% of gays and lesbians were victims of violence, compared to 2.4% of heterosexuals. And 32% of the respondents stated they would take offence when seeing two men kiss and 23% when seeing two women kiss (and 12% when seeing two people of the opposite sex kiss).

In April 2017, a same-sex couple was attacked by a group of Moroccan youth in the city of Arnhem. After the attack, several politicians, police officers, priests and many others showed their opposition to violence against LGBTQ people by holding hands in public. Displays also occurred in other countries, namely the United Kingdom, the United States and Australia. Approximately 400 to 600 attacks against LGBTQ people occurred between 2011 and 2017, according to LGBTQ group COC.

In September 2019, King Willem-Alexander called on the UN General Assembly to support LGBTQ rights. In November 2019, the Dutch Government announced it would continue to support LGBTQ rights groups worldwide. The House of Representatives voted for a motion asking that LGBTQ rights be one of the three priorities of Dutch membership at the United Nations Human Rights Council. The Minister of Foreign Trade and Development Cooperation, Sigrid Kaag, has announced support for international LGBTQ rights groups, as well as organizations that campaign for food security, nature and climate, women's rights and freedom of expression. With Dutch support, local LGBTQ organizations in the Seychelles and Botswana were successful in having their anti-gay sodomy laws repealed or struck down.

In July 2020, the city of Nieuwegein ended its twin-city scheme with the Polish city of Puławy due to it enacting a "gay free zone".

== Summary table ==
Right	Yes/No	Note
Same-sex sexual activity legal	Yes	Since 1811
Equal age of consent (16)	Yes	Since 1971
Anti-discrimination laws (employment)	Yes	Since 1994, since 2023 by constitutional amendment for sexual orientation
Anti-discrimination laws (provision of goods and services)	Yes	Since 1994, since 2023 by constitutional amendment for sexual orientation
Anti-discrimination laws (all other areas incl. hate speech)	Yes	Since 1994, since 2023 by constitutional amendment for sexual orientation
Recognition of same-sex relationships	Yes	Since 1998; as registered partnerships
Same-sex marriage(s)	Yes	Since 2001, first country in the world to legalize same-sex marriages
Stepchild adoption by same-sex couples	Yes	Since 2001
Joint adoption by same-sex couples	Yes	Since 2001
Access to IVF for lesbian couples	Yes	Since 2000
International joint adoption by same-sex couples	Yes	Since 2009
LGBTQ people allowed to serve openly in the military	Yes	Since 1973 for lesbian, gay and bisexual people Since 2014 for transgender people
Right to change legal gender	Yes	Since 1985. Gender-affirming surgery and sterilization not required since 2014.
Automatic parenthood for both female spouses after birth	Yes	Since 2014, sperm donor anonymous until child's 16th birthday
Anti-discrimination laws covering sex characteristics, gender identity and gender expression	Yes	Since 2019
Legal recognition of non-binary gender	Yes	Since 2018
Third gender option	Yes	Since 1993 at birth: a child with ambivalent sex characteristics can register their sex as "cannot be determined". In addition, parents may choose the option "X" up to three months after the birth; Since 2020 after birth: "X" sex option only available after successful court petition.
Gender self-identification		
Automatic parenthood for both male spouses after surrogate childbirth	Yes	Since 2020
MSMs allowed to donate blood	Yes	Since 2021, gay men within monogamous relationships are no longer subjected to the four-month waiting period. New guidelines suggest that from January 1, 2023, the decision will solely be based on behaviour instead of sexual-orientation.
Conversion therapy banned	Yes	The bill passed the Senate on June 16, 2026. After Royal Assent it will become officially law.
Intersex minors protected from invasive surgical procedures	No	
Altruistic surrogacy for same-sex couples	Yes	Altruistic surrogacy is legal for both same-sex and opposite-sex couples

== See also ==
- Human rights in the Netherlands
- Same-sex marriage in the Netherlands
- Same-sex marriage in Aruba, Curaçao and Sint Maarten
- LGBTQ rights in Europe
- LGBTQ rights in the European Union
