= LGBTQ history in Iceland =

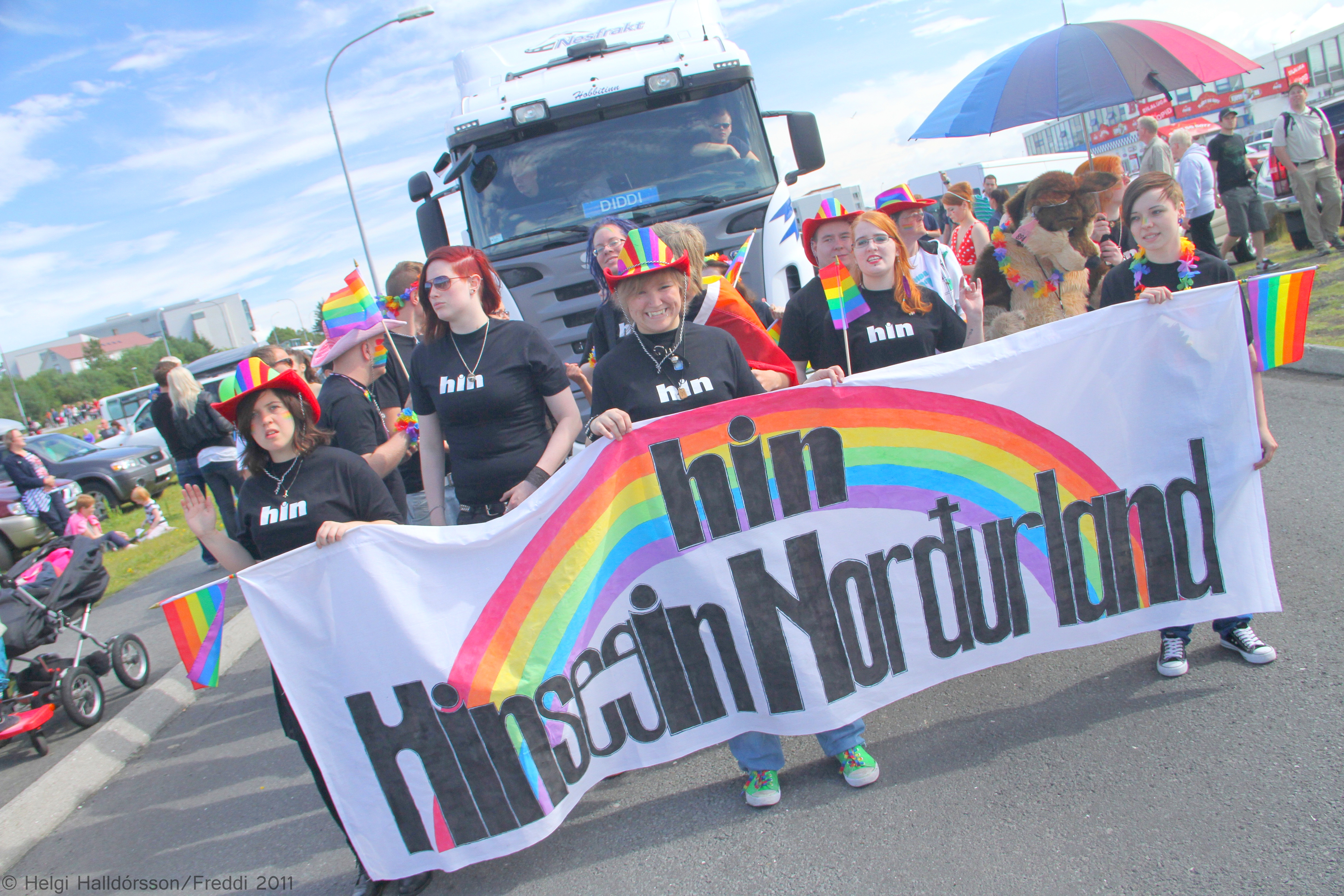
Participants in the 2011 Reykjavik Pride parade

The history of the lesbian, gay, bisexual, transgender and queer (LGBTQ) people in Iceland differs from other Scandinavian countries due to the low visibility of LGBTQ individuals until the mid-20th century. This was because Iceland's population was much smaller than that of its Nordic counterparts and because for much of its history it was primarily an agrarian society where most people lived in thinly-populated rural areas.

However, since the late 20th century, Iceland has become one of the most inclusive countries in the world for LGBTQ people, ranking amongst the top countries for LGBTQ rights, and events such as Reykjavik Pride annually bring together around a third of the country's total population. Iceland is a very safe place for both LGBTQ citizens and travellers. The country is listed in the "Top 10 Gay Wedding Destinations" by Lonely Planet.

== History ==
Section 178 of the Penal Code of Iceland criminalized same-sex relations in Iceland between 1869 and 1940. Registered partnerships for same-sex couples became legal in 1996. On 27 June 2006, Icelandic same-sex couples became eligible to a range of laws including public access to IVF insemination treatment and joint adoption of children. Stepchild adoption (where a person can adopt their partner's biological child) has been permitted in Iceland since 2000.

The first public figure to publicly come out as gay in Iceland was the singer, songwriter, and celebrity Hörður Torfason in 1975. He was 30 years old at the time. He had to leave Iceland for several years because his safety was at risk. A group of 12 gay men led by Hörður Torfason founded Samtökin '78 in 1978. Samtökin '78 is the National Queer Organization of Iceland.

The early years of Samtökin '78 were very controversial. Samtökin '78 published the magazine Out From Hiding, which was the first queer publication in Iceland, in 1982. In 1983, HIV was first reported in Iceland, which had a huge negative impact on the gay community in Iceland. In the same year, the first interview with a lesbian couple was published. Lana Kolbrún Eddudóttir became the chair of Samtökin '78 in 1989, and she is the youngest person to serve as chair.

Samtökin '78 organised the first gay and lesbian march in Iceland in 1993. The number of participants was only a few dozen. A group of bisexuals wanted to join, but this was not supported by Samtökin '78. A new organisation was formed in 1993, but only lasted a few years. The second gay and lesbian march was held in 1994, which included people from both Samtökin '78 and the new organisation. About 70 people participated in the march.

In 1996, the Althing passed amendments to the Icelandic Penal Code, adding sexual orientation to the country's non-discrimination law. This made it illegal to refuse people goods or services on account of their sexual orientation, or to attack a person or group of people publicly with mockery, defamation, abuse or threats because of their sexual orientation. In 2014, the Parliament approved an amendment to the Penal Code, adding gender identity to the list of anti-discrimination grounds. Since 2008, it has been illegal to discriminate against people on the basis of their sexual orientation in education.

Same-sex relationships were made legal in 1996 after years of struggle. The relation allowed the same legal rights as an opposite-sex marriage, but adoption was not allowed. Adoption by any sexual orientation was made legal in 2006.

A celebration was held in Reykjavík by Samtökin '78 in 1999, which was attended by 1500 people. In 2007, Samtökin '78 started to include bisexual and transgender people. The organisation Trans Iceland was founded in the same year. Jóhanna Sigurðardóttir became the first openly gay head of government in the world after becoming Prime Minister of Iceland in 2009.

On 23 March 2010, the Government of Iceland presented a bill which would allow same-sex couples to marry. On 11 June 2010, Parliament unanimously approved the bill, 49 votes to 0. The law took effect on 27 June. That day, Prime Minister Jóhanna Sigurðardóttir married her partner Jónína Leósdóttir, becoming one of the first same-sex couples to marry in Iceland. In October 2015, the Church of Iceland voted to allow same-sex couples to marry in its churches.

On 11 June 2012, the Icelandic Parliament voted in favour of a new law relaxing rules surrounding gender identity and allowing comprehensive recognition regarding recognition of acquired gender and enacting gender identity protections.

In June 2019, the Althing voted 45–0 on a bill to implement a self-determination model, similar to numerous European and South American countries. The new law allows transgender individuals to change their legal gender without having to receive a medical and mental disorder diagnosis, or undergo sterilization and sex reassignment surgery. Minors may also change their legal gender with parental consent. Furthermore, the law allows individuals to choose a third gender option known as "X" on official documents. The law went into effect on 1 January 2020, and finally implemented in January 2021. The bill also includes a ban on medical interventions performed on intersex children against their will, with some exceptions in cases of health-related reasons, and a committee was set up to report on the issue.

The Iceland Parliament passed a bill to ban conversion therapy on 9 June 2023, with a vote of 53–0 with 3 abstentions.

== See also ==
- LGBTQ rights in Iceland
