= LGBTQ rights in the Sahrawi Arab Democratic Republic =

- Sahrawi Arab Democratic Republic in dark green and claimed territories but occupied by Morocco in light green
- Legal status: Illegal (dubious)
- Penalty: Up to 3 years' imprisonment (dubious)
- Discrimination protections: None

Family rights
- Recognition of relationships: No recognition of same-sex unions
- Adoption: No

Lesbian, gay, bisexual, transgender, and queer (LGBTQ) people in the Sahrawi Arab Democratic Republic (SADR) face significant challenges not experienced by non-LGBTQ residents.

== Status ==
Multiple sources such as the Council for Global Equality, Equaldex and the International Lesbian, Gay, Bisexual, Trans and Intersex Association describe same-sex sexual activity as being illegal in the SADR for both males and females, and punishable by up to three years in prison.

According to a 2009 USCRI report, Sahrawi government officials in refugee camps in Algeria "declared that they were holding some prisoners on charges of "homosexuality" even as they alleged facts that would more fittingly describe rape."

Ahmed Mulay Alli, diplomatic representative of the SADR in Mexico, was quoted in a 2010 report as saying "the Constitution of the SADR does not refer to homosexuality or any other sexual practice; that is, it does not touch on it, it does not punish it". According to the Spanish Commission for Refugee Aid (CEAR), there is thus no type of protection for LGBTQ individuals in case of discrimination or violence. Most residents of the country are Muslim, and same-sex relationships are seen as a foreign phenomenon.

The region was under Spanish colonial rule until 1976, and homosexuality was not decriminalized in Spain until 1979. Same-sex sexual activity is also illegal in Morocco, which occupies most of the territory in Western Sahara claimed by the SADR.

== See also ==
- Human rights in Western Sahara
- LGBTQ rights in Morocco
