= Trans Ísland =

Icelandic LGBTQ organization

Trans Ísland is an Icelandic advocacy organisation that supports transgender people in Iceland. As of 2018, the chairperson of the group was Alda Villiljós.

== History ==
Trans Ísland was founded in 2007, as a section of Samtökin '78.

In 2010, the group helped fight for the public broadcaster RÚV to stop using the term “kynskiptingur” (“sex-changer”) in stories about trans people, switching instead to “transfólk.” In 2015, the group assisted in establishing another group, Non-Binary Iceland, its sibling organisation.

In 2019, the group was involved in helping draft a new law on legal gender recognition in Iceland, replacing the medicalised system with one based on statutory declaration and allowing individuals to choose a third gender option known as "X" on official documents. The Althing voted 45–0 to pass the law in June of that year. That year, the group's chairperson, Owl Fisher was named one of the BBC's 100 Women.

In January 2020, the group was awarded a 500,000 ISK grant from the City of Reykjavík's Gunnar Thoroddsen Memorial Fund for humanitarian work. On Women's Rights Day in Iceland that year, organised an event together with the Icelandic Women's Rights Association (IWRA) that saw several different feminist organisations in the country discuss strategies to stop anti-trans sentiment from increasing its influence within Icelandic feminism. In December 2020, Trans Ísland was unanimously granted status as a member association of the IWRA.

In January 2021, they collaborated with the RVK Feminist Film Festival for the 2021 edition of the festival.

== See also ==
- LGBT rights in Iceland
