= Ingólfsdóttir =

Ingólfsdóttir is a patronymic. Notable people with the surname include:

- Kristín Ingólfsdóttir (born 1954), Icelandic scientist
- Ragna Ingólfsdóttir (born 1983), Icelandic badminton player
- Rósa Ingólfsdóttir (born 1947), Icelandic actress
