= Reykjavik Pride =

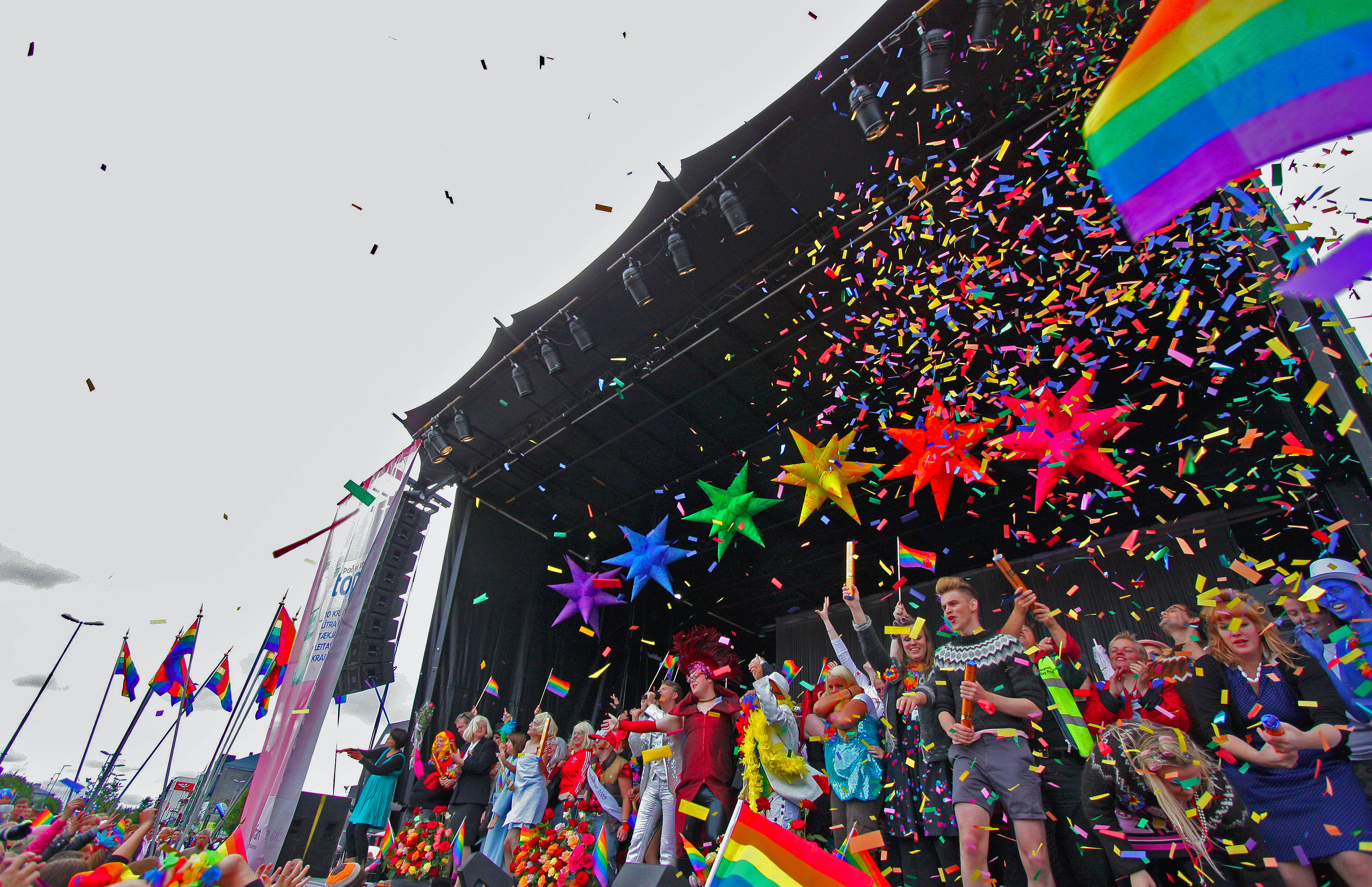

Reykjavík Pride (Icelandic: Hinsegin dagar í Reykjavík) is Iceland's largest human rights festival, focused on LGBT+ issues. The festival has been held annually in Reykjavík since 1999.

== History ==
The first queer celebration in Reykjavík, a queer weekend (Icelandic: Hinsegin helgi), was held by Samtökin '78 in 1999 with a program at Ingólfstorg square. About 1,500 visitors attended to commemorate the 30 years anniversary of the Stonewall riots. A year later, in August 2000, the first Pride Parade was held in Reykjavík, which was given the Icelandic name Gleðigangan ("March of Joy") and was part of a three-day celebrations in Reykjavík. Reykjavik Pride had then been founded as an independent organisation under the leadership of Heimir Már Pétursson and Þorvaldar Kristinsson. The name "March of Joy" was chosen deliberately to contrast with earlier, smaller protest marches held in 1993 and 1994, which had been called "liberation marches." According to Heimir Már Pétursson, the goal was to create "the complete opposite" of a demonstration, avoiding any mention of "resistance or trouble." Organizers suppressed reports of homophobic incidents, such as a costume rental agency refusing to provide national costumes for drag performers, to maintain a facade of universal acceptance. The attendance of the first Reykjavík Pride Parade was beyond expectations and it has been stated that up to 12,000 visitors attended the city centre.

Since then, Reykjavík Pride has been held annually in the Reykjavík, the festival's program is longer and the number of events has increased. Today, Reykjavík Pride is Iceland's biggest annual festival, with over 100,000 guests visiting the city centre during the Pride Parade.

== Controversies and criticism ==
Scholars Þorsteinn Vilhjálmsson and Íris Ellenberger have critiqued Reykjavík Pride's "March of Joy" discourse for fostering a form of Icelandic homonationalism, where the nation's self-image as a "queer paradise" is used to stereotype Eastern European immigrants as homophobic and joyless. This narrative redirects blame for any remaining homophobia away from Icelandic society and onto national others. They argue that the parade's emphasis on joy and gratitude encourages forgetting past state homophobia, AIDS deaths, and radical queer activism. This forward-looking, happy temporality aligns with neoliberal values of self-responsibility and discourages structural critique. The parade's strategy helped it to grow rapidly but also depoliticized LGBTQ+ visibility in Iceland.

In 2019, queer activist Elí Hörpu og Önundar was arrested, when trying to access the Reykjavík Pride parade with signs calling for queer liberation from an anti-racist perspective. Police reports later revealed that the Pride organizers had tipped off the police, claiming that Elí planned to disrupt the march. Elí denied any intention to disrupt and stated they were on their way to join the parade. The organizers issued an official apology in 2022, three years after the arrest.

== Leaders of Reykjavik Pride ==
- Helga Haraldsdóttir, President from 2023
- Gunnlaugur Bragi Björnsson, President 2021–2023
- Ásgeir Helgi Magnússon, President 2020–2021
- Vilhjálmur Ingi Vilhjálmsson, President 2020
- Gunnlaugur Bragi Björnsson, President 2018–2020
- Eva María Þórarinsdóttir Lange, President 2012–2018
- Heimir Már Pétursson, Director (volunteer) 1999–2011
- Þorvaldur Kristinsson, President 1999–2012

== Dates ==
=== Next festival ===
- 4-9 August 2026

=== Previous festivals ===
- 5-10 August 2025
- 6–11 August 2024
- 8–13 August 2023
- 2–7 August 2022
- 3–8 August 2021 (some events were canceled, due to COVID-19, including the Pride Parade)
- 2–9 August (most events were canceled, due to COVID-19)
- 8–17 August 2019 (20 years anniversary)
- 7–12 August 2018
- 8–13 August 2017
- 9–14 August 2016
- 4–9 August 2015
- 5–10 August 2014
- 6–11 August 2013
- 7–12 August 2012
- 4–7 August 2011
- 5–8 August 2010
- 6–9 August 2009
- 6–10 August 2008
- 9–12 August 2007
- 10–13 August 2006
- 4–7 August 2005
- 6–7 August 2004
- 8–9 August 2003
- 9–10 August 2002
- 10–11 August 2001
- 11–12 August 2000
- 24–27 August 1999
