= Abdellah Taïa =

Moroccan writer and filmmaker (born 1973)

- عبد الله الطايع
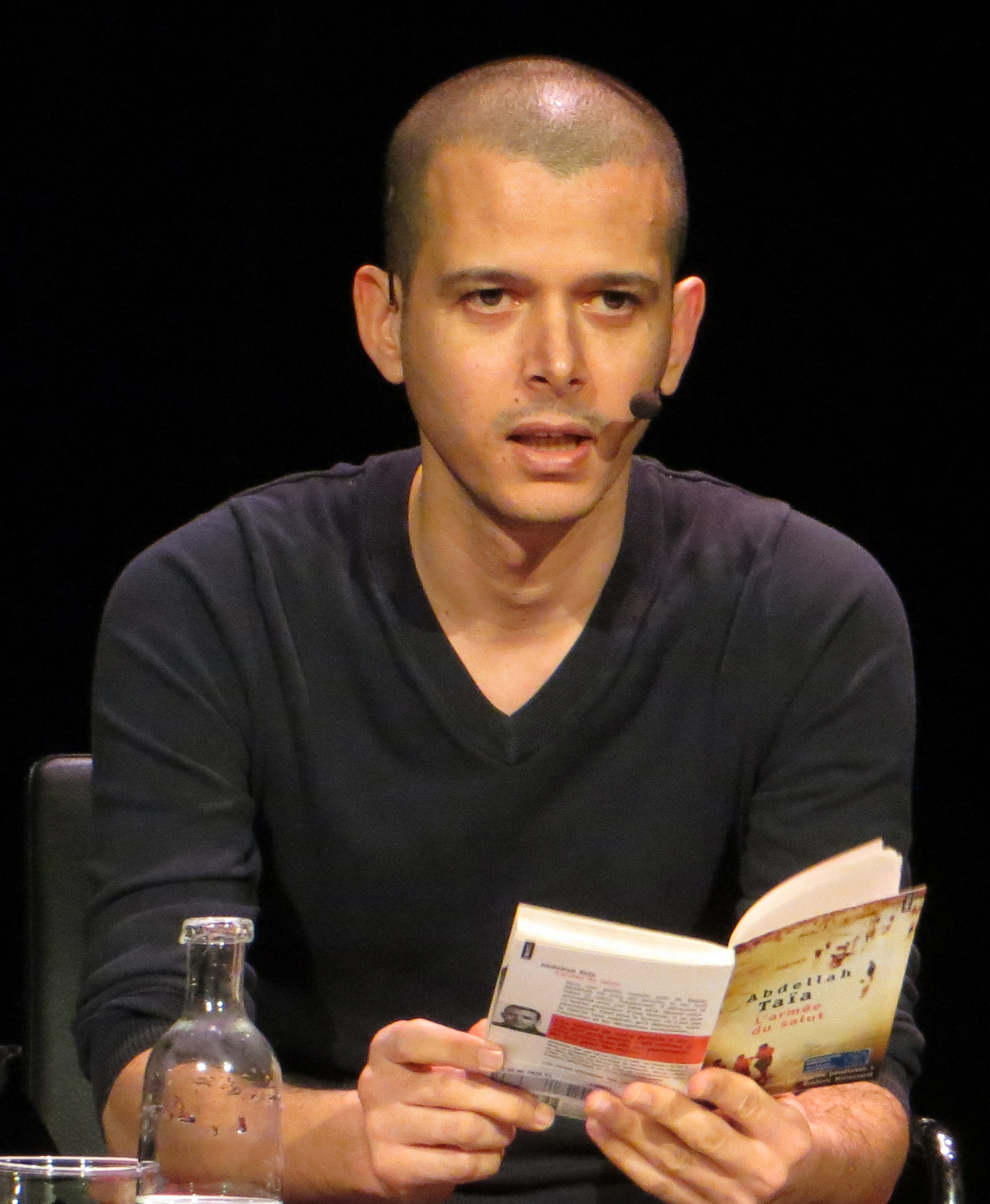
- Taïa reading from one of his novels at the International Writers' Stage at the Kulturhuset in Stockholm, Sweden, in 2013
- Born: 1973 (age 52–53); Rabat, Morocco
- Education: Mohammed V University; University of Geneva; Sorbonne (PhD)
- Occupation: Writer
- Years active: 2004–present
- Website: abdellahtaia.free.fr

Abdellah Taïa (Arabic: عبد الله الطايع; born 1973) is a Moroccan writer and filmmaker who writes in the French language and has been based in Paris since 1999. He has published nine novels, many of them heavily autobiographical. His books have been translated into Arabic and many European languages.

Described by Interview Magazine as a "literary transgressor and cultural paragon," Taïa claimed to be the first openly gay Arab writer in 2006, and, as of 2014, he claims to be the only openly homosexual Moroccan writer or filmmaker. His first movie, Salvation Army, is widely considered to have given Arab cinema "its first gay protagonist." Since his coming-out, according to one source, Taïa "has become an iconic figure in his homeland of Morocco and throughout the Arab world, and a beacon of hope in a country where homosexuality is illegal."

== Early life and education ==
Taïa was born in 1973 in Rabat, Morocco. According to The New York Times, Taïa "was born inside the public library of Rabat [...] where his dad worked as a janitor and where his family lived until he was 2." He grew up in Hay Salam, a neighborhood of Salé, a city near Rabat. His family was poor. He had nine siblings. He first came into contact with literature through his father's job at the library.

Taïa lived in Hay Salam from 1974 to 1998. He has described the experience:

Everything I have known about the world comes from this city and this neighborhood. Everything I want to put in my book is also coming from this world. The house where I lived there was very small, only three rooms for eleven people. One room for my father, the second for my older brother, Abdelkebir, who exerted a big influence on me, and the last one for the rest of the family: my mother, my six sisters, my little brother and me. Life for me still revolves around these three rooms. The tastes, the smells, the images, the ideas of fear and transgression are all coming from this house, this poor family that I love and hate at the same time. For many years, we were really poor, we didn't have enough food and we fought with each other a lot. The power structures within the family were a mirror of the dictatorship Morocco was living under at that time.

As a young boy, he touched a high-voltage power generator and was unconscious and presumed dead for an hour. After he woke up he was labeled "the miracle boy". In 2010 he said: "I still have some of the electricity I got that day. I was somewhere during that 'dead time,' but where, I don't know. Perhaps the reason I write is because I want to know the answer to that question".

Taïa was an effeminate boy who "always knew he was gay". For most of his childhood, according to The New York Times, "he hid his sexuality as best he could, but his effeminate demeanor brought mockery and abuse, although it would later become a source of artistic inspiration." His family "probably always knew" he was gay, he later said, but they "never talked about it." When he was 11, a mob of men gathered outside his family's home and shouted for him to come out to be raped. "Everyone heard, not only my family but the whole neighbourhood," he later recalled. "What I saw clearly was that this is how society functions and that no one can protect you, not even your parents. That's when I realized I had to hide who I am".

He described this incident at length in a 2012 op-ed for The New York Times, titled "A Boy to Be Sacrificed":

In the Morocco of the 1980s, where homosexuality did not, of course, exist, I was an effeminate little boy, a boy to be sacrificed, a humiliated body who bore upon himself every hypocrisy, everything left unsaid. By the time I was 10, though no one spoke of it, I knew what happened to boys like me in our impoverished society; they were designated victims, to be used, with everyone's blessing, as easy sexual objects by frustrated men. And I knew that no one would save me – not even my parents, who surely loved me. For them too, I was shame, filth. A 'zamel' [...]

It all came to a head one summer night in 1985. It was too hot. Everyone was trying in vain to fall asleep. I, too, lay awake, on the floor beside my sisters, my mother close by. Suddenly, the familiar voices of drunken men reached us. We all heard them ... These men, whom we all knew quite well, cried out: 'Abdellah, little girl, come down. Come down. Wake up and come down. We all want you. Come down, Abdellah. Don't be afraid. We won't hurt you. We just want to have sex with you.' [...]

I hoped my big brother, my hero, would rise and answer them [...] But my brother, the absolute monarch of our family, did nothing. Everyone turned their back on me [...] I was never the same Abdellah Taïa after that night [...] I began by keeping my head low all the time. I cut all ties with the children in the neighborhood. I altered my behavior. I kept myself in check: no more feminine gestures, no more honeyed voice, no more hanging around women. No more anything. I had to invent a whole new Abdellah [...] Sooner or later, I would leave it behind. I would grow up and find freedom somewhere else. But in the meantime I would become hard. Very hard.

Taïa's older brother, Abdelk'bir, was a cultural influence on Taïa, introducing him to the music of David Bowie, James Brown, and Queen, the films of David Cronenberg, Elia Kazan, and Ang Lee, and the books of Robert Louis Stevenson, Dostoevsky, and Tawfik al-Hakim. He "spent his childhood watching Egyptian movies, detailing them in a scrapbook where he collected pictures of movie stars he admired, like Faten Hamama and Souad Hosni," according to The New York Times. "The freedom in Egyptian cinema, where women appeared without veils and alcohol was consumed openly, pervaded his living room and gave him hope." He has said that Egyptian films were "the only culture that we had access to in Morocco, as a poor family ... They taught us a lot about love, about society, about ourselves. And as a homosexual, they pretty much saved me, because they allowed me to escape to this whole other world." He has also said that "Egyptian movies saved me [...] There was already the idea of transgression through television happening in my house with my sisters. In my head, I connected that to homosexuality". At age thirteen, he "decided that one day [he] would go to Paris in order to be what [he] wanted to be: A director and filmmaker".

Taïa's parents "stressed education and sent five of their nine children to university." He studied French literature while living in Rabat, "his gaze set upon Paris and the possibilities that city represented to him, namely a career in film." Taïa said in 2010 that "It was clear to me that eventually I had to get to Paris, because this was the city of Isabelle Adjani [...] This was the city of Rimbaud and Marcel Proust [...] The target was to go there to be free as a homosexual, but at the same time to achieve these dreams—to write movies and books, and to dream big, if I may say that".

When he began college, he

realized that my French was really poor. To master it, I decided to write my diary in French. For me that was the best way to be confronted with the language, to have a relationship with it without any mediation or intercession. My literary writing emerged from this relationship and that diary, which I kept for many years in Morocco. That's how I became a writer.

His French skills "improved so much," thanks largely to his diary, "that he won a scholarship to study 18th-century French literature in Geneva." He went to Switzerland in 1998 and studied there for a semester. In 1999 he went to the Sorbonne, on another scholarship, to work on his doctoral thesis. In Paris "Taïa broke away from what he saw as the oppressive confines of his family and Moroccan society and began a process of self-actualization".

== Career ==
Taïa's books deal with his life living in a homophobic society and have autobiographical background on the social experiences of the generation of Moroccans who came of age in the 1980s and 1990s. Five of Taïa's novels have been published by Editions du Seuil in France. Two of his novels, Salvation Army (2009) and An Arab Melancholia (2012), have been published in English translation by Semiotext(e).

=== Mon Maroc (My Morocco) ===
Taïa has said that Mon Maroc (My Morocco) "is my story. The story of my Moroccan life that took place, over the course of 25 years, on the banks of the river Bou Regreg, in the two towns that are located at its mouth: Rabat and Salé, the first on the left bank, the other on the right bank". Taïa wanted to name the book after Gus Van Sant's My Own Private Idaho, a film that "became mythical" for him when he saw it in Morocco. Lacking a French equivalent, he used My Morocco instead.

=== Le Rouge du Tarbouche (The Red of the Fez) ===
Taïa's second book, Le Rouge du Tarbouche (The Red of the Fez), is a collection of short stories. It marked the beginning of his open challenge to Morocco's antigay laws. After a Moroccan TV channel sent a film crew to Paris to interview Taïa for a documentary on Moroccan artists living abroad, the coverage led to other media attention, making the book a bestseller. Taïa became "an unlikely literary darling in the country he'd fled".

==== Coming out ====
Taïa has explained what happened when Le rouge du Tarbouche came out in Morocco and he was interviewed by a reporter for the French-Arab journal Tel Quel: "She wanted to do a profile on me and was interested in speaking about the themes of homosexuality in my books. She wanted to know if I was willing to speak freely. We were in a coffee shop in Casablanca. I never imagined it would happen like that, but I understood that was the moment of truth: The truth about me, my books, and my position in the world. Although it was really scary and I knew that there would be many consequences, I had to do it. I owed it to that little boy who had dreams at thirteen. Now that I have the possibility to speak, I'm not going to stop." The resulting cover story in Tel Quel was headlined "Homosexuel, envers et contre tous" ("Homosexual, against all odds").

He came out, he said in another interview, because

I never hide. I never put that aspect of my personality aside. I know so many gay intellectuals or writers who say, 'I am not going to talk about homosexuality because it doesn't interest people.' But for me this makes no sense. It would be like a heterosexual who doesn't present himself as a heterosexual. I never planned to come out.

After Taïa came out publicly, "it took years to overcome the rifts" between him and his family, he told The New York Times in 2014. "They cried and screamed [...] I cried when they called me. But I won't apologize. Never".

After he began talking in public about his homosexuality, he was widely condemned in Morocco.

The editor of Al Massae, Morocco's biggest-selling newspaper, wrote an editorial denouncing Taïa and attacking the use of public money to fund TV shows that featured him. Bloggers called for him to be stoned. Newspaper readers wrote to attack his credentials. 'They said I am a prostitute and not a Muslim anymore, that I should apologize for the shame I brought to my mother, to my religion, to my town, to my country. These attacks hurt, but worse was the silence of the Moroccan intellectuals. It just confirmed that they were dead people who live in another world–they don't talk about us, about the reality of Morocco.'

Some members of the Moroccan press, however, were "really supportive", as were the French press and some of the Arabic press, he later recalled, but "Others were just attacking, attacking, attacking without stop".

The scandal over Taïa's coming-out led to "a debate about gay rights and the oppression of the individual in Morocco, and to a greater extent, the entire Arab world." Still, as of 2014, he remains "the only Moroccan intellectual to 'come out.'"

=== L'Armée du salut (Salvation Army) ===
During the public outrage over his Tel Quel interview that Taïa wrote L'armée du Salut (Salvation Army), a "bildungsroman of his youthful dreams and indiscretions set in Rabat, Tangier, and Geneva".

Taïa's English-language publisher, Semiotext(e), describes Salvation Army as "a coming-of-age novel that narrates the story of Taïa's life with complete disclosure—from a childhood bound by family order and latent (homo)sexual tensions in the poor city of Salé, through an adolescence in Tangier charged by the young writer's attraction to his eldest brother, to his disappointing 'arrival' in the Western world to study in Geneva in adulthood—and in so doing manages to burn through the author's first-person singularity to embody the complex mélange of fear and desire projected by Arabs on Western culture, and move towards restituting their alterity".

Salvation Army was described in Out Magazine as "a gay coming-of-age novel" whose "perspective–rooted in the claustrophobic world of a poor Moroccan neighborhood–lends it freshness rare in English literature". It was described by author David Ebershoff as one of the best gay books of 2009 and by Edmund White, who wrote the introduction to the American edition, as marked by "a simplicity that only intelligence and experience and wide reading can buy". Variety called it "a bold coming out, unadorned by guilt or sensationalism and directly confronting Western expectations, at least in gay circles, of Arab youth as adornments rather than equal companions".

Interview Magazine described Salvation Army as

a valuable contribution not only to queer fiction but to North African diaspora literature as well. A resident of Paris over the last decade, Taïa has joined the column of Moroccan expatriates–Tahar Ben Jelloun and Abdelkebir Khatibi, among others–who cast a telescopic eye over the thorny and often violent ideological interchange between postmodern Europe and postcolonial Africa. But Taïa's words are not scrawled with the bellicose politics of a partisan; rather, they are auguries of a familial world imbued with both magic and poverty; lilting and resolute; a prose of stark divinity and apostasy."

=== Une mélancolie arabe (An Arab Melancholia) ===
Une mélancolie arabe (An Arab Melancholia) is an "autobiographical novel of self-discovery [...] about an openly gay man who lives between cultures in Egypt and France".

=== Le jour de roi (The King's Day) ===
His novel Le jour de roi (The King's Day), about King Hassan II, "was banned in Morocco". But after it received the 2010 Prix de Flore literary prize, "the ban was lifted. My books are now translated into Arabic and are available in Morocco, a sign that things are changing".

=== Lettres à un jeune marocain (Letters to a Young Moroccan) ===
Taïa responded to the 2007 death of two young brothers in a suicide attack on the U.S. consulate in Casablanca with a Le Monde editorial titled "We Have to Save Moroccan Youth". At his urging, several Moroccan artists and writers of his generation wrote follow-up essays to his editorial, which were published in 2009 as a book, edited by Taïa, titled Lettres à un jeune marocain (Letters to a Young Moroccan). Pierre Bergé, the partner of Yves Saint Laurent, "agreed to fund the printing and distribution of 90,000 copies of the book in French and Arabic".

=== Vivre à ta lumière (Live in Your Light) ===
Published in 2022, according to the English publisher of the book Penguin Random House Canada, "this is a story in praise of a woman, a fighter, based on Taïa's mother M'Barka Allali Taïa (1930–2010), to whom the book is dedicated. Three moments in the life of Malika, a Moroccan countrywoman is her voice. Malika’s first husband was sent by the French to fight in Indochina, the novel takes place from 1954 to 1999 – from French colonization to the death of King Hassan II. In the 1960s, in Rabat, she does everything possible to prevent her daughter Khadija from becoming a maid in a rich French woman’s villa. The day before the death of Hassan II, a young homosexual thief, Jaâfar, enters her home and wants to kill her. Malika recounts with rage her strategies to escape the injustices of history. To survive and to have a little space of her own".

The book was shortlisted for the prestigious Prix Goncourt in 2022.

=== Essays and articles ===
In 2009, when Morocco's interior ministry began to crack down on writing that challenged the country's "moral and religious values", Taïa published an open letter, "Homosexuality Explained to My Mother", in Tel Quel.

Taïa wrote a piece for The Guardian in December 2010 about Mikhail Khodorkovsky, who,

formerly the richest man in his country, was accused of tax fraud in 2003 and has been languishing in a Siberian prison for seven years. His crime? To have wanted for his country a true democracy, as well as genuine respect for human rights [...] Since 2003, this intelligent, romantic, wonderful man is my only hero. He is far from perfect but his battle, which he refuses to give up on, touches me deeply. Russia and the world need him.

=== Film ===
Taïa directed a film adaptation of his book Salvation Army. It "gave the Arab world its first on-screen gay protagonist", according to The New York Times. Taïa has said that Michael Powell's film Black Narcissus "directly influenced Salvation Army." The film, a French-Moroccan-Swiss production, was shown at the Venice and Toronto film festivals in 2013. It was screened in February 2014 at the National Film Festival in Tangier, won the Grand Prix at the Angers Film Festival in France, and was shown at the New Directors Festival in New York in March 2014. The reviewer for Variety stated that in the film "Taïa retains the bare bones but strips away warmth and insight, without any fresh perceptions that would compensate". Another reviewer, however, called the film "disciplined and poetic", praising Taïa for managing "to regard his own story with relative objectivity" and concluding that the film "avoids the usual pitfalls of political cinema, precisely because Taïa is able to remain focused on particulars, the overwhelming feel of things". A reviewer for the Atlantic wrote that at a Venice Film Festival "notable for the prevalence of works grappling with global and societal woes, perhaps no film has blended the personal and the political as strikingly as Abdellah Taïa's L'Armée du salut (Salvation Army)."

"Before shooting", Taïa has noted, he submitted the screenplay of his film "in its original form to the authorities at the National Centre for Moroccan Cinema.... They approved the screenplay, and I hope they end up following through by allowing the film to be released."

=== Later projects ===
Taïa said in April 2014 that his next book was "a tale about old Moroccan prostitutes who at the end of their careers touring the world have landed in Paris".

In fall 2015, Taïa visited the University of Pittsburgh as a visiting fellow in the Gender, Sexuality, and Women's Studies Program. While on campus, he recorded a podcast as part of the school's Year of the Humanities.

Taïa has noted that he is coauthoring a play to be performed in Paris.

== Other professional activities ==
In 2001, he appeared in a French gay film The Road to Love.

He participated in October 2013 in the International Festival of Authors.

He spoke at the Oslo Freedom Forum in May 2014.

== Views ==
=== Homosexuality ===
"The problem with homosexuals", Taïa has said,

is that they are not accepted from the beginning. Where I come from, homosexuals allegedly do not exist, which is a horrible thing to live with and to accept. I had no other choice but to accept this non-existence. We could call this exile, meaning that your people, the ones who say they love you, that want to protect you, that want the best for you, and give you food—milk, honey, and so many other things—they deny you the most important thing, which is recognizing you as a human being.

According to a 2014 New York Times profile, Taïa,

has patched up relations with most family members, though there are still awkward moments. His older brother, always cold and distant, remains estranged [...] His mother died shortly after Mr. Taïa came out, and he now has a cordial relationship with his sisters. He has over 40 nieces and nephews who symbolize a new more open-minded generation of Moroccans – they often post messages of encouragement on his official Facebook page.

Nonetheless, "he finds it hard to go home" because he can't talk to his siblings. "I am just a human being. They were ashamed of me. I always felt they were. I don't want them to be proud of me. And anyway, they're not." He "can't live in Morocco," he says, because his "entire neighborhood wanted to rape me. A lot of people in Morocco are abused by a cousin or a neighbor but society doesn't protect them. There, rape is insignificant. There is nothing you can do."

He said in 2012 that while the Moroccan government and society have not changed dramatically in their views of homosexuality, one thing that has changed is that "when officials talk about human rights and the freedom of individuals, they also talk about homosexuals." Also,

the Moroccan press has dramatically changed its view on homosexuality—for example, they defend me. They also give gay people in Morocco the chance to express themselves. There are young gay Moroccans who created a gay magazine in Arabic. And there's now an Arabic word for 'homosexual' that is not disrespectful: 'mithly.' It was created just six years ago, and is now used everywhere.

=== Islam and the Arab Spring ===
According to a 2014 New York Times profile, Taïa "considers himself Muslim because he is very spiritual, and he believes that freedom has existed in Islam through those such as the Arab philosopher Averroes and the Iranian poet Rumi, and in works such as '1001 Nights.'" Taïa told the Times, "I don't want to dissociate myself from Islam [...] It is part of my identity. It is not because I am gay that I will reject it. We need to recover this freedom that has existed in Islam." In 2013, Taïa told The Atlantic, "I consider myself culturally Muslim. I feel connected to the great writers and thinkers of Islamic civilization, the great philosophers, sociologists and poets. I believe firmly in secularism, and I think that Muslims would be better off liberating themselves from religion. Islam should have no role in government".

He strongly supported the "February 20 movement" in Morocco that demanded democratic reforms. He wrote about this in the 2014 book "Arabs Are No Longer Afraid." He has said that the "people who started the Arab Spring are young people, and the revolution was stolen from them by the Islamists."

=== Other views ===
Taïa is a fan of the films of Marilyn Monroe and of the directors Gus Van Sant, Douglas Sirk, and Tsai Ming-Liang.

"Books, like the film, do not solve anything", Taïa told The New York Times in 2014; "what I produce artistically does not help me in any way in my real life. Nothing is resolved. Everything is complex, complicated. I sincerely believe that there is only love to heal and soothe troubled souls".

== Honors and awards ==
Le jour du Roi was awarded the French Prix de Flore in 2010.

== Personal life ==
In 2007, he publicly came out of the closet in an interview with the literary magazine TelQuel, which created controversy in Morocco.

== Bibliography (selection) ==
- Mon Maroc. Séguier, 2000. English translation by Rachael Small: Another Morocco: Selected Stories, Semiotext(e), 2017.
- Le rouge du tarbouche. Séguier, 2004. English translation by Rachael Small: Another Morocco: Selected Stories, Semiotext(e), 2017.
- L'Armée du salut. Seuil, 2006. English translation by Frank Stock: Salvation Army, Semiotext(e), 2009.
- Maroc 1900–1960, un certain regard. Actes Sud, 2007 (with Frédéric Mitterrand).
- Une mélancolie arabe. Seuil, 2008. English translation by Frank Stock: An Arab Melancholia, Semiotext(e), 2012.
- Le jour du roi. Seuil, 2010.
- Infidèles. Seuil, 2012. English translation by Alison Strayer: Infidels, Seven Stories Press, 2016.
- Un pays pour mourir. Seuil, 2015. English translation by Emma Ramadan: A Country for Dying, Seven Stories Press, 2020 - won the 2021 PEN Translation Prize.
- Celui qui est digne d'être aimé. Seuil, 2017.
- La Vie lente, roman, Seuil, 2019.
- Vivre à ta lumière, roman, Seuil, 2022.
- Le Bastion des larmes, roman, Julliard, 2024.

== See also ==
- LGBT rights in Morocco
- List of LGBT writers
- List of Moroccan writers
- List of novelists
- Rachid O.
