= Rachid O. =

Moroccan writer (born 1970)

- Born: 1970 (age 55–56); Rabat, Morocco
- Occupation: Writer
- Writing career
- Language: French
- Years active: 1990s–present
- Genre: Novel
- Notable works: L'enfant ébloui, Chocolat chaud

Rachid O. (born 1970 in Rabat) is a Moroccan writer.

== Biography ==
Rachid was born in Rabat, and after studying in Marrakesh he moved to France, where he began writing about the balance between the Muslim world and homosexuality.

Since 2000, he has been a resident at the Villa Medici (French Academy in Rome), which is directed by the Fondation de France.

== Works ==
Rachid O. considers himself closer to Hervé Guibert than to his contemporary Moroccan writers. His works have significantly influenced the perception of homosexuality in Maghrebi literature.

His first novel, L'enfant ébloui ("The Dazzled Child"), tells the story of a young Moroccan boy who is attracted to boys and men and "takes pleasure in that commerce".

His book Chocolat chaud (Hot Chocolate) is a coming-of-age story about a young Moroccan navigating between two cultures, with his head full of dreams and images of France. It is his third novel, described as "full of joy for life, of doubts, of simplicity, and a language that evokes the purest sense of the word 'innocent'."

== Bibliography ==
- 1995: L'enfant ébloui, Gallimard
- 1996: Plusieurs vies, Gallimard
- 1998: Chocolat chaud, Gallimard
- 2003: Ce qui reste, Gallimard
- 2013: Analphabètes, Gallimard

== See also ==
- LGBT rights in Morocco
- Abdellah Taïa
