= Salvation Army (film) =

2013 French-Swiss-Moroccan drama film

- Directed by: Abdellah Taia
- Written by: Abdellah Taia
- Starring: Said Mrini, Karim Ait M'Hand, Amine Ennaji
- Cinematography: Agnès Godard
- Edited by: Françoise Tourmen
- Release date: 2013
- Running time: 80 minutes

Salvation Army is a 2013 French-Swiss-Moroccan drama film written and directed by Abdellah Taia in his directorial debut. It is an adaptation of Taia's 2006 autobiographical novel of the same name. Taia submitted the controversial film's original screenplay to the National Centre for Moroccan Cinema, hoping it would be released in Morocco. The film won multiple awards and was screened at the Venice Film Festival.

== Synopsis ==
The film follows Abdellah, a young Moroccan gay man with a distant father, a demanding mother, and an older brother he looks up to. Abdellah is trying to find his way in a society that denies his sexuality. Once he leaves to college in Geneva, he finds freedom but must come to terms with the loss of his homeland.

== Cast ==
- Saïd Mrini (young Abdellah)
- Karim Ait M'Hand (adult Abdellah)
- Amine Ennaji (Slimane)
- Frédéric Landenberg (Jean)
- Hamza Slaoui (Mustapha)
- Malika El Hamaoui (Abdellah's mother)
- Abdellah Swilah (Abdellah's father)
- Youness Chara (smoker)
- Oumaima Miftah (sister #1)
- Souhaila Achike (sister #2)
- Houda Mokad (sister #3)
- Ibtissam Es Shaimi (sister #4)
- Hasna Boulahama (sister #5)

== Awards and accolades ==
- Grand Jury Prize: French Feature Film (Angers Film Festival)
- Special Programming Award for Artistic Achievement (Outfest Film Festival)
- Best First Feature Film (Durban International Film Festival)
