= LGBTQ rights in Iceland =

- Location of Iceland (dark green) in Europe (dark grey) – [Legend]
- Legal status: Legal since 1940, age of consent equalized in 1992
- Gender identity: Transgender people allowed to change gender without surgery
- Military: No standing army
- Discrimination protections: Sexual orientation and gender identity protections (see below)

Family rights
- Recognition of relationships: Same-sex marriage since 2010
- Adoption: Full adoption rights since 2006

Lesbian, gay, bisexual, transgender, and queer (LGBTQ) rights in Iceland rank among the highest in the world. Icelandic culture is generally tolerant towards homosexuality and transgender individuals, and Reykjavík has a visible LGBT community. Iceland ranked first on the Equaldex Equality Index in 2023, and second after Malta according to ILGA-Europe's 2024 LGBT rights ranking, indicating it is one of the safest nations for LGBT people in Europe. Conversion therapy in Iceland has been illegal since 2023.

Same-sex couples have had equal access to adoption and IVF since 2006. In February 2009, a minority government took office, headed by Jóhanna Sigurðardóttir, the world's first openly gay head of government in modern times. The Icelandic Parliament amended the country's marriage law on 11 June 2010 by a unanimous vote to define marriage as between two individuals, thereby making same-sex marriage legal. The law took effect on 27 June 2010. Iceland was the ninth country in the world to legalise same-sex marriage, and among the first European countries to do so. In 2019, Iceland made gender-affirming healthcare accessible via informed consent.

== Legality of same-sex sexual activity ==
According to a 2020 study, "scholars have found that it was with modernization and increasing urbanization in the latter half of the nineteenth century that same-sex sexual acts between consenting men became thought of as criminal."

Section 178 of the Penal Code of Iceland criminalized same-sex relations in Iceland between 1869 and 1940. In 1992, the age of consent was set at 14, and in 2007 it was raised to 15, regardless of gender and sexual orientation. (Note: (Icelandic) The Icelandic Penal Code: 202. gr. Hver sem hefur samræði eða önnur kynferðismök við barn, yngra en 15[fimmtán] ára, skal sæta fangelsi ekki skemur en 1[eitt] ár og allt að 16[sextán] árum.; Section 202 Anyone who has carnal intercourse or other sexual intimacy with a child younger than 15 years shall be subject to imprisonment for at least 1 year and up to 16 years.)

== Recognition of same-sex relationships ==
Registered partnerships for same-sex couples became legal in 1996. The legislation, known as the Law on Registered Partnerships (Icelandic: Lög um staðfesta samvist), was replaced by a gender-neutral marriage law on 27 June 2010. Upon registering their partnerships, same-sex couples were granted many of the same rights, responsibilities and benefits as marriage, including the ability to adopt stepchildren.

On 23 March 2010, the Government of Iceland presented a bill which would allow same-sex couples to marry. On 11 June 2010, Parliament unanimously approved the bill, 49 votes to 0. The law took effect on 27 June. That day, Prime Minister Jóhanna Sigurðardóttir married her partner Jónína Leósdóttir, becoming one of the first same-sex couples to marry in Iceland.

In October 2015, the Church of Iceland voted to allow same-sex couples to marry in its churches.

== Adoption and family planning ==
On 27 June 2006, Icelandic same-sex couples became eligible to a range of laws including public access to IVF insemination treatment and joint adoption of children. Stepchild adoption (where a person can adopt their partner's biological child) has been permitted in Iceland since 2000.

== Discrimination protections ==
In 1996, the Althing passed amendments to the Icelandic Penal Code, adding sexual orientation to the country's non-discrimination law. This made it illegal to refuse people goods or services on account of their sexual orientation, or to attack a person or group of people publicly with mockery, defamation, abuse or threats because of their sexual orientation. In 2014, the Parliament approved an amendment to the Penal Code, adding gender identity to the list of anti-discrimination grounds.

Since 2008, it has been illegal to discriminate against people on the basis of their sexual orientation in education.

Until 2018, Iceland possessed no laws prohibiting employment discrimination on any grounds. A committee that Welfare Minister Eygló Harðardóttir founded in 2014 handed in its conclusions in November 2016, advising the Parliament to pass a general discrimination law. Such a law would include protections on the basis of sexual orientation, gender identity and sex characteristics. On 11 June 2018, the Parliament approved a law banning employment discrimination based on sexual orientation, gender identity, gender expression and sex characteristics, among others. The law, known as the Law on Equal Treatment in the Workplace (Icelandic: Lög um jafna meðferð á vinnumarkaði), took effect on 1 September 2018.

== Transgender and intersex rights ==
On 11 June 2012, the Icelandic Parliament voted in favor of a new law relaxing rules surrounding gender identity and allowing comprehensive recognition regarding recognition of acquired gender and enacting gender identity protections. These laws were enacted on 27 June 2012. The laws state that the National University Hospital of Iceland is obligated to create a department dedicated to diagnosing gender dysphoria, as well as performing sex reassignment surgery (SRS). After successfully completing an 18-month process, including living 12 months in accordance with their gender, applicants appear before a committee of professionals. If the committee determines that a diagnosis of gender dysphoria is appropriate, the National Registry is informed and the applicant chooses a new name to reflect their gender and is issued a new ID. SRS is not required for an official name change and gender recognition.

In June 2019, the Althing voted 45–0 on a bill to implement a self-determination model, similar to numerous European and South American countries. The new Act on Gender Autonomy allows transgender individuals to change their legal gender without having to receive a medical and mental disorder diagnosis, or undergo sterilization and sex reassignment surgery. Minors may also change their legal gender with parental consent. Furthermore, the law allows individuals to choose a third gender option known as "X" on official documents. The law went into effect on 1 January 2020, and finally implemented in January 2021. The bill also includes a ban on medical interventions performed on intersex children against their will, with some exceptions in cases of health-related reasons, and a committee was set up to report on the issue.

=== Access to medical care ===
Icelandic law on gender affirming healthcare historically was more restrictive, with trans patients having to go through a minimum of one year of psychiatric evaluation before they're allowed to begin hormone therapy or puberty blockers, and three years or more for surgery.

In 2019, however, a bill was passed to allow trans people to access such healthcare by informed consent, eliminating all of the above requirements for access.

== Sex education ==
Since 2016, the town of Hafnarfjörður has included information about same-sex relationships in its eighth grade (age 14–15) sex education lessons.

The Queer Student Association of Iceland organises several social activities, such as field trips, where students of the University of Iceland can discuss and learn about LGBT issues.

== Blood donation ==
In 2014, a man filed a lawsuit against the blood ban, describing the current policy as a clear example of discrimination.

In October 2015, Health Minister Kristján Þór Júlíusson announced his support for regulatory changes to enable MSM in Iceland to donate blood. It was announced that Iceland would allow gay and bisexual men to donate blood. In September 2021 it was announced that gay and bi men would be able to legally donate blood after a 4-month deferral period. Since September 2026, men who have had sex with other men are able to donate blood without restrictions.

== Conversion therapy ==
The Iceland Parliament passed a bill to ban conversion therapy on 9 June 2023, with a vote of 53–0 with 3 abstentions.

== Public opinion ==
A February 2000 Gallup opinion poll showed that 53% of Icelanders supported the right of lesbians and gay men to adopt children, 12% declared their neutrality and 35% were against the right to adopt.

A July 2004 Gallup poll showed that 87% of Icelanders supported same-sex marriage.

In May 2015, PlanetRomeo, an LGBT social network, published its first Gay Happiness Index (GHI). Gay men from over 120 countries were asked about how they feel about society's view on homosexuality, how they experience the way they are treated by other people, and how satisfied are they with their lives. Iceland was ranked first with a GHI score of 79.

== Living conditions ==
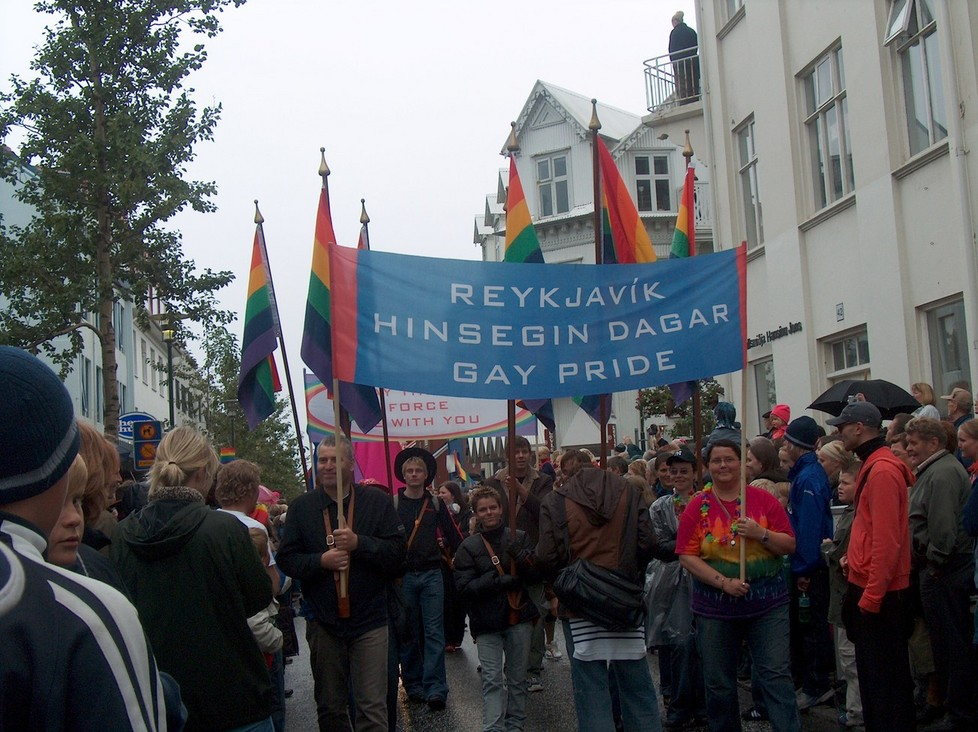
Gay Pride 2004 in Reykjavík

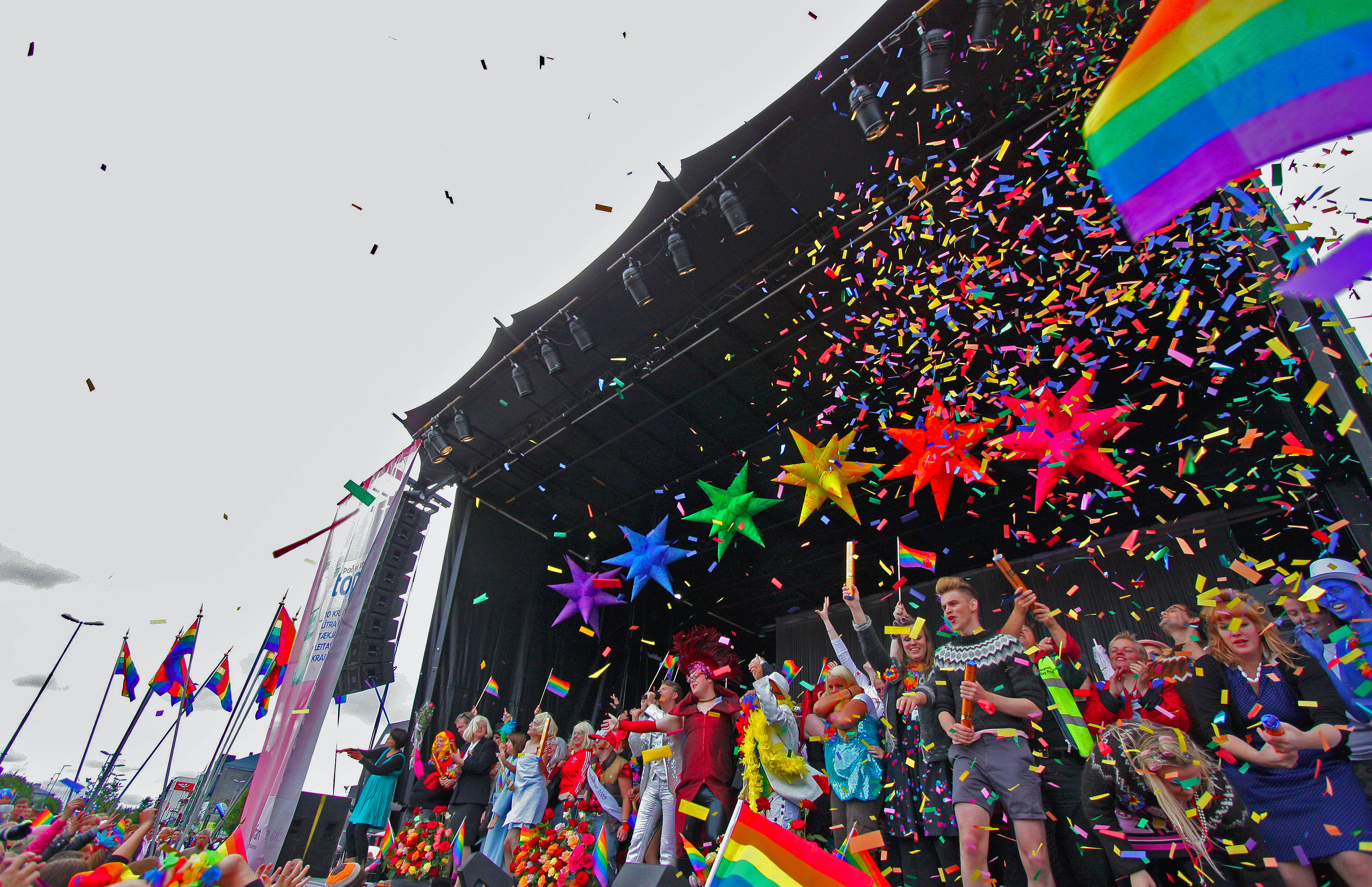
Participants at the 2009 Reykjavík Pride parade

Despite its small population, Iceland has a visible gay scene, particularly in the capital Reykjavík, which has a few bars and cafés, and some places with a mixed gay and straight crowd. Elsewhere in Iceland, however, the sparse population means there is almost no gay scene. Akureyri, the biggest city outside the capital area, does not have any gay bars.

Gay pride parades in Iceland are usually held in August, and are among Iceland's biggest annual events. In 2015, about 100,000 attended the Reykjavík Pride event, representing about 30% of the Icelandic population. In 2016, Icelandic President Guðni Th. Jóhannesson participated in the Reykjavík Pride parade, making him the first president to attend a gay pride parade.

Iceland is frequently referred to as one of the safest and most LGBT-friendly countries in the world, alongside Canada, Sweden, and the Netherlands. Despite public antipathy towards LGBT people being high up until the 1980s, acceptance has increased significantly since then. Some of the earliest LGBT people to publicly come out include Hörður Torfason and Anna Kristjánsdottir, who both initially faced public discrimination and ridicule. The oldest existing Icelandic LGBT organization is Samtökin '78, which formed in 1978. They organized their first public protests in 1982, with support from sister associations in Denmark, Sweden and Norway. During the 1980s, Iceland came under considerable pressure from other Nordic states to improve the living conditions of LGBT people and pass anti-discrimination legislation; in 1984, the Nordic Council urged its member states to end discrimination against gays and lesbians. Over the following years, LGBT groups and activists began to enter the public eye and raise awareness of their cause and movement. With greater visibility, societal attitudes began to evolve and become more accepting and tolerant. In 1996, registered partnerships were legalised for same-sex couples, making Iceland the fourth country worldwide to provide legal recognition to same-sex couples (after Denmark, Norway, and Sweden). Anti-discrimination laws covering sexual orientation were also enacted, adoption by same-sex couples was legalised, and transgender transition laws were relaxed, allowing transgender people the right to change their legal gender on official documents. In 2010, the Icelandic Parliament voted unanimously to legalise same-sex marriage; Iceland became the ninth country to legalise it, joining the Netherlands, Belgium, Spain, Canada, South Africa, Norway, Sweden, and Portugal. In addition, former Prime Minister Jóhanna Sigurðardóttir (2009–2013), the first openly gay head of government of modern times, and her partner Jónína Leósdóttir became one of the first couples to marry in Iceland after the passage of the new law. Opinion polls have found overwhelming public support for same-sex marriage and LGBT rights more broadly. A 2004 poll showed that 87% of Icelanders supported same-sex marriage, the highest in the world at that time. Moreover, in 2015, the Church of Iceland (about two-thirds of Icelanders are members) voted to allow same-sex couples to marry within its churches.

Iceland is a very safe place for both LGBT citizens and travellers. The country is listed in the "Top 10 Gay Wedding Destinations" by Lonely Planet.

== Summary table ==
Same-sex sexual activity legal	Yes (Since 1940)
Equal age of consent (15)	Yes (Since 1992)
Anti-discrimination laws in employment	Yes (Since 2018)
Anti-discrimination laws in the provision of goods and services	Yes (Since 1996)
Anti-discrimination laws in all other areas (incl. indirect discrimination, hate speech)	Yes (Since 1996)
Anti-discrimination laws concerning gender identity	Yes (Since 2014)
Same-sex marriage	Yes (Since 2010)
Recognition of same-sex unions	Yes (Since 1996)
Stepchild adoption by same-sex couples	Yes (Since 2000)
Joint adoption by same-sex couples	Yes (Since 2006)
LGBT people allowed to serve openly in the military	(No standing army)
Right to change legal gender by self-determination	Yes (Since 2021)
Third gender option	Yes (Since 2020)
Conversion therapy outlawed	Yes (Since 2023)
Intersex minors protected from invasive surgical procedures	Yes (Since 2020)
Equal access to IVF for all couples and automatic parenthood for both spouses after birth	Yes (Since 2006)
Commercial surrogacy for gay male couples	(Illegal for all couples regardless of sexual orientation)
MSMs allowed to donate blood	Yes (Since 2026)

== See also ==
- Human rights in Iceland
- LGBTQ rights in Europe
- LGBTQ history in Iceland
