= Equaldex =

LGBTQ rights online resource

Equaldex is an online publication resource on LGBTQ rights. Subsections of the website are a collaborative knowledge base. Equaldex publishes a ranking of LGBTQ rights by country and territory. As of October 2025, the head of Equaldex is Dan Leveille.

== LGBTQ Equality Index ==
The Legal Index is determined on the basis of 13 different legal issues, such as the legal status of homosexuality, the possibility of same-sex marriage, the fullness of the rights of transgender people, and so on. These issues have different weights. For example, the legality of same-sex marriage has a greater impact on the index than the ability of LGBTQ people to openly serve in the military. If different laws apply in different regions of the country, then the average value is calculated. Laws begin to affect the index only after they come into force, and not immediately after adoption, so changing the index has a delay. A complete list of criteria and coefficients is provided on the resource's website.

The Public Opinion Index measures the public attitudes towards LGBTQ people. The index is calculated on the basis of polls and votes conducted by reputable organizations, using on arithmetic averages of various studies. If the survey contained a point "Do you approve of same-sex marriage?" and 56% of people answered "yes", then the value "56" will be used for the corresponding sub-item of the index. In some cases results of a survey can be used with less weight if the survey was specific or conducted among a specific group of people (for example, among representatives of a religion). Surveys over the age of 2 years are taken with less weights.

The Equality Index is the arithmetic mean between the Legal Index and the Public Opinion Index.

The data as of September 1, 2026:

Our World in Data Map

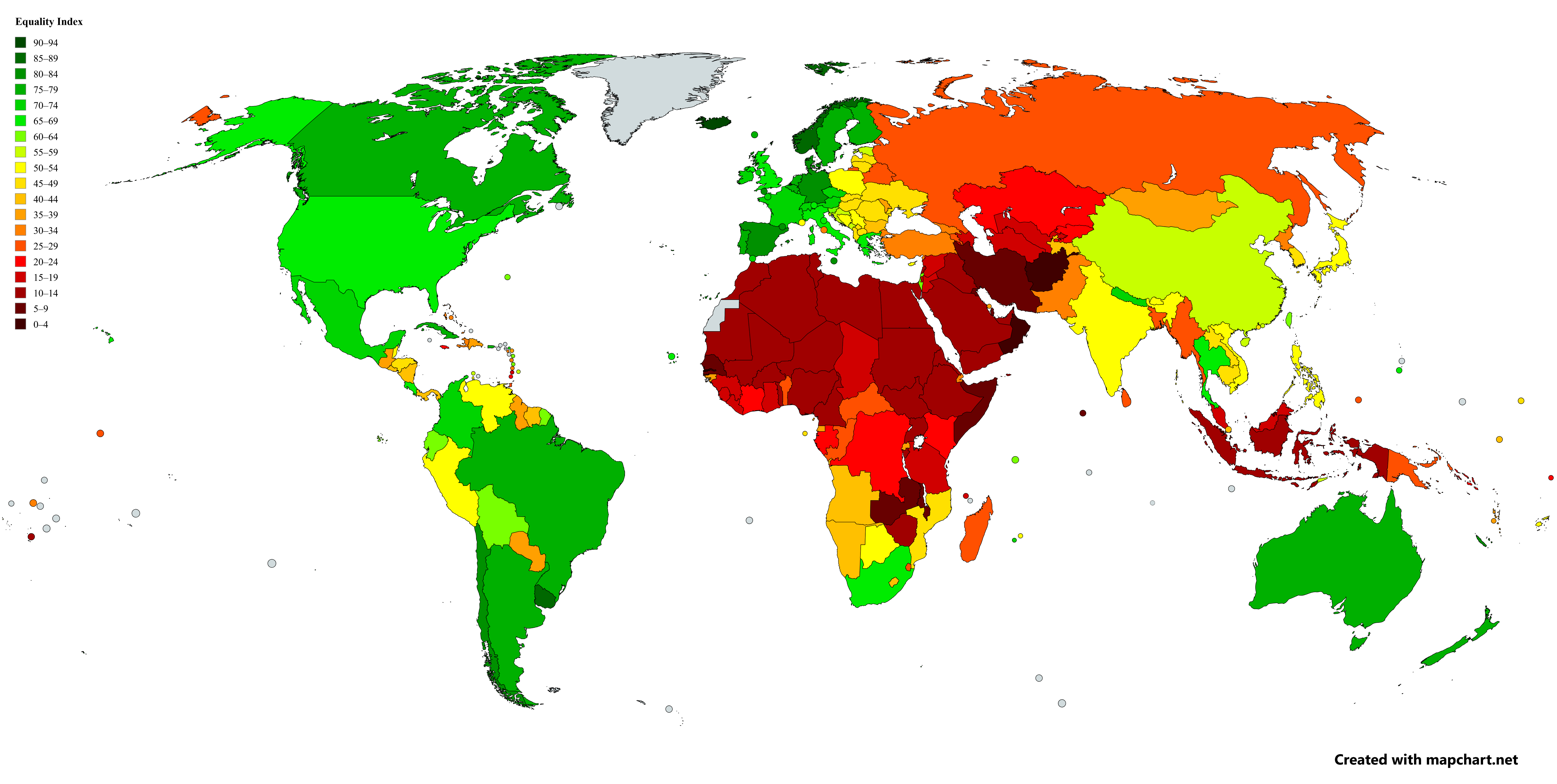
Map of countries by the LGBTQ Equality Index, as of September 1, 2026

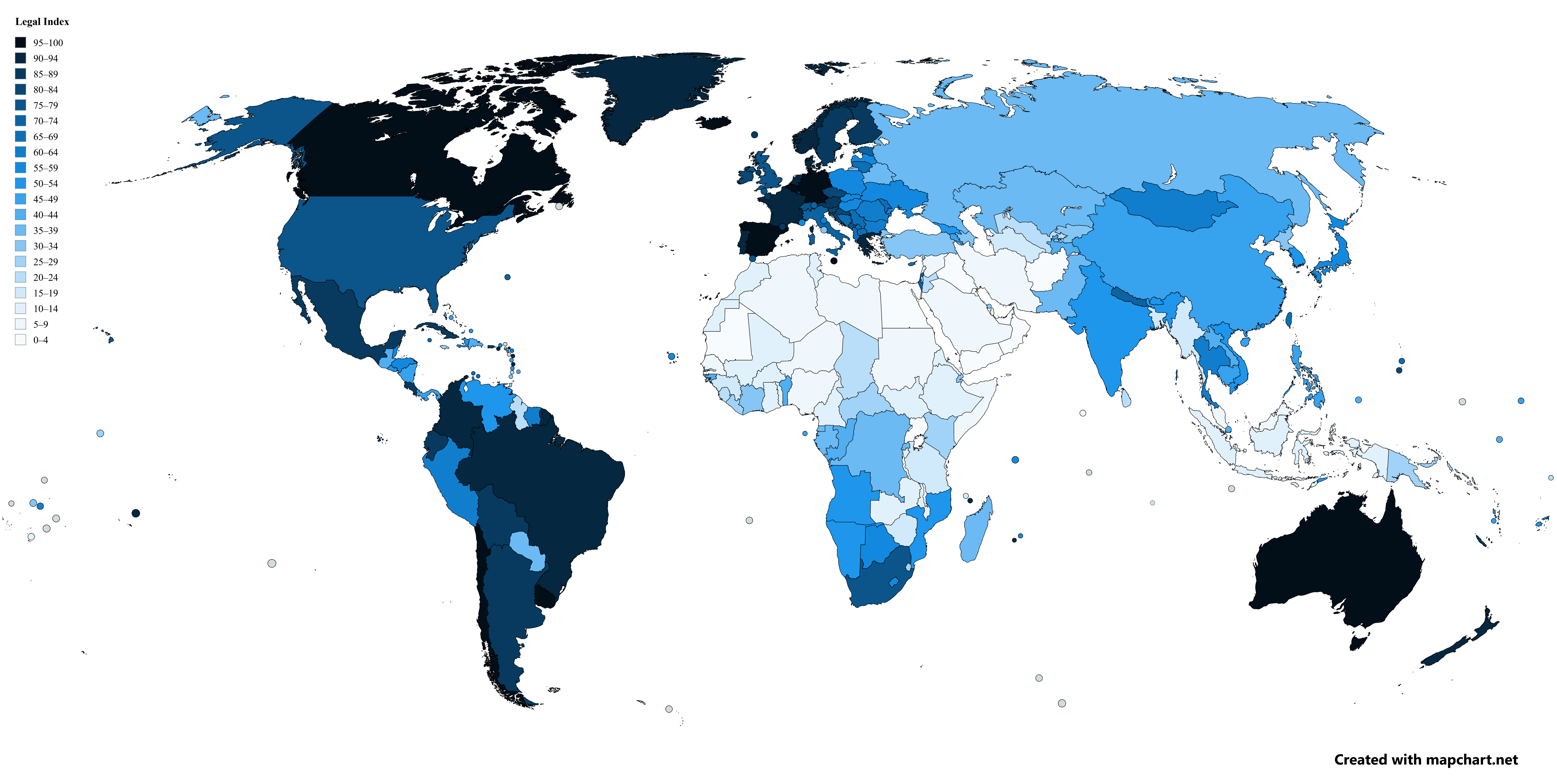
Map of countries by the LGBTQ Legal Index (2026)

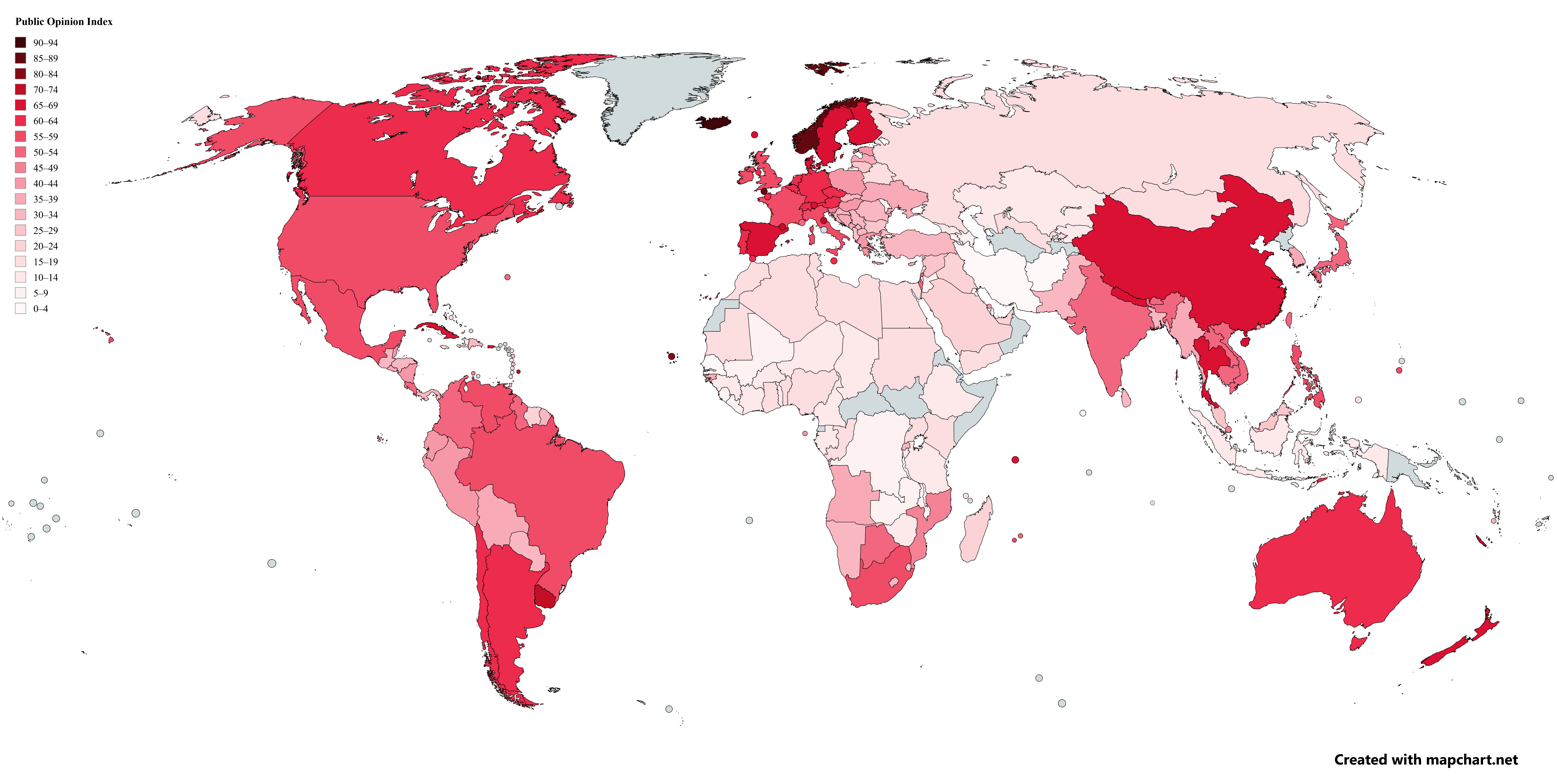
Map of countries by the LGBTQ Public Opinion Index (2026)

Country or territory	Equality Index	Legal Index	Public Opinion Index
Iceland	93	96	90
Norway	89	90	87
Uruguay	87	100	74
Spain	83	100	67
Guernsey	82	77	87
Denmark	82	94	69
New Caledonia	80	89	71
Malta	80	100	61
Chile	80	100	60
Andorra	80	86	74
Germany	80	99	60
Faroe Islands	79	89	68
New Zealand	78	91	65
Australia	78	95	61
Canada	78	95	61
Belgium	78	95	61
Portugal	77	94	60
Netherlands	77	90	64
Puerto Rico	76	86	66
Finland	76	87	66
Cuba	76	86	66
Sweden	75	85	65
Argentina	75	89	61
Brazil	75	94	56
Isle of Man	74	88	60
Jersey	74	88	60
France	74	90	58
Austria	74	88	60
Saint Barthélemy	74	90	—
Réunion	73	90	55
Czechia	72	81	64
Gibraltar	71	79	63
Mexico	71	86	57
Colombia	71	92	50
Nepal	71	74	68
Switzerland	70	76	64
Ireland	70	81	59
Guam	69	83	55
Costa Rica	69	85	54
Liechtenstein	69	70	68
Cape Verde	68	56	80
Luxembourg	67	82	52
South Africa	67	77	57
San Marino	67	63	71
United Kingdom	67	79	55
Italy	66	74	59
Greece	66	91	40
United States	66	75	56
Thailand	65	63	67
Slovenia	64	80	48
Ecuador	64	86	42
Bolivia	63	87	38
Bermuda	62	74	50
French Guiana	62	90	34
Israel	62	74	51
Guadeloupe	61	90	32
Martinique	61	90	32
Seychelles	61	56	66
Taiwan	60	69	51
Aruba	58	68	48
Hong Kong	58	61	56
Estonia	58	72	44
Croatia	57	81	33
China	56	47	66
Montenegro	56	76	35
Barbados	55	40	71
Timor-Leste	55	50	60
Monaco	54	58	51
Mauritius	54	57	52
Philippines	54	49	59
Japan	53	57	50
Peru	53	62	44
Botswana	53	55	51
Venezuela	53	50	56
Vietnam	52	51	53
India	52	50	53
Fiji	51	51	—
Cyprus	51	66	36
Bosnia and Herzegovina	51	65	38
Bhutan	51	52	50
Poland	51	59	43
Serbia	51	68	33
Belize	50	57	44
North Macedonia	49	66	33
Hungary	49	58	40
Ukraine	49	59	39
Mozambique	48	50	47
Marshall Islands	48	48	—
Kosovo	48	66	30
Albania	48	68	28
Cambodia	48	45	51
Lithuania	47	67	28
Laos	47	44	50
Macau	46	52	40
Romania	46	60	33
Latvia	46	57	35
Slovakia	46	58	33
South Korea	46	53	39
Sao Tome and Principe	46	47	44
Honduras	46	58	33
Lesotho	44	56	32
Bulgaria	44	62	27
Micronesia	44	44	—
Singapore	44	40	49
Nicaragua	44	48	40
El Salvador	43	50	35
Angola	42	50	35
Namibia	42	51	33
Suriname	41	60	23
Nauru	40	40	—
Panama	40	45	34
Tajikistan	40	40	—
Vanuatu	39	45	34
Equatorial Guinea	39	39	—
Guyana	39	24	53
Antigua and Barbuda	39	60	17
Mongolia	39	60	17
Guinea-Bissau	38	40	37
Dominican Republic	37	42	33
Moldova	37	66	8
Bahrain	37	32	42
Guatemala	36	40	31
Rwanda	35	38	32
Paraguay	35	38	31
Djibouti	34	34	—
Pakistan	34	36	31
North Korea	34	34	—
Saint Kitts and Nevis	34	52	15
Saint Lucia	34	50	17
Vatican City	33	33	—
Turkey	33	34	33
Haiti	32	52	11
Dominica	31	48	14
Georgia	31	50	13
Bahamas	31	45	16
Samoa	31	31	—
Madagascar	29	37	22
Central African Republic	29	29	—
Benin	29	41	16
Republic of the Congo	28	40	17
Palau	28	41	16
Sri Lanka	28	21	34
Trinidad and Tobago	27	27	27
Russia	27	35	19
Eswatini	26	25	27
Kiribati	26	26	—
Myanmar	26	15	38
Belarus	26	35	16
Armenia	26	46	5
Papua New Guinea	25	25	—
Bangladesh	25	17	33
Gabon	24	35	13
Grenada	24	31	17
Tuvalu	23	23	—
Côte d'Ivoire	23	32	14
Kazakhstan	23	35	11
Kenya	23	26	19
Kyrgyzstan	22	34	10
Solomon Islands	22	22	—
Democratic Republic of the Congo	22	36	8
Jamaica	22	26	18
Azerbaijan	19	34	5
Uzbekistan	19	20	18
Chad	19	24	14
Comoros	19	19	19
Palestine	18	28	8
Syria	18	9	27
Saint Vincent and the Grenadines	18	28	8
Malaysia	18	8	27
Turkmenistan	17	17	—
Liberia	17	25	9
Guinea	17	19	14
Jordan	15	24	6
Tanzania	15	16	14
Ghana	15	13	18
Sierra Leone	15	23	6
Lebanon	14	13	15
Tonga	14	14	—
Tunisia	14	12	15
Sudan	13	8	19
Libya	13	8	19
Saudi Arabia	13	5	22
Zimbabwe	13	16	10
Algeria	13	7	19
Morocco	13	11	15
United Arab Emirates	12	2	23
Iraq	12	3	22
Ethiopia	12	12	13
Togo	12	12	12
Indonesia	12	12	11
Cameroon	11	11	11
Eritrea	11	11	—
South Sudan	11	11	—
Nigeria	11	7	15
Burundi	11	11	10
Uganda	10	3	18
Niger	10	9	12
Yemen	10	4	17
Burkina Faso	10	10	10
Mauritania	10	4	16
Egypt	10	4	15
Mali	10	10	9
Malawi	9	13	5
Zambia	9	10	8
Maldives	8	8	8
Qatar	7	6	9
Kuwait	6	7	6
Iran	6	9	3
Senegal	5	7	3
Oman	2	2	—
Gambia	4	5	4
Somalia	4	4	—
Brunei	4	4	—
Afghanistan	1	0	2
Greenland	—	93	—
Western Sahara	—	14	—

== About ==
Equaldex is a collaborative knowledge base for the LGBTQ movements.

The website's planning and development began in December of 2009. After 5 years of work, the Equaldex index went public on February 25, 2014.

The site currently has 8 moderators: danlev, beeurd, Notdog1996, Samanthos, Ratabzoo, qcksws, Aleksander, and Unknownmiles.

== Criticism ==
One of the primary criticisms of Equaldex is that many of the data entries are not properly sourced or cited, making it difficult to verify the accuracy of the information. In Equaldex, inaccurate, incomplete, or biased information is often posted without proper fact-checking. Without clear references or links to credible sources, people may be misled by incorrect data. Users may inadvertently introduce errors or intentional misinformation, which could skew the data. For example, a claim that a certain country legalized same-sex marriage might be reported prematurely or inaccurately, causing disinformation among public.
