= Spouse of the prime minister of Iceland =

- Incumbent; Gunnar Sigvaldason since 30 November 2017
- Inaugural holder: Þóra Jónsdóttir
- Formation: 4 January 1917

The spouse of the prime minister of Iceland refers to the wife or husband of Iceland's head of government.

== Spouse of prime minister of Iceland (since 1970) ==
Spouse	Prime minister	Duration
Ragnheiður Hafstein	Jóhann Hafstein	10 July 1970 – 14 July 1971
Dóra Guðbjartsdóttir	Ólafur Jóhannesson	1 September 1978 – 15 October 1979; 14 July 1971 – 28 August 1974
Erna Finnsdóttir	Geir Hallgrímsson	28 August 1974 – 1 September 1978
Heidi Gröndal	Benedikt Gröndal	15 October 1979 – 8 February 1980
Vala Ásgeirsdóttir	Gunnar Thoroddsen	8 February 1980 – 26 May 1983
Guðlaug Edda Guðmundsdóttir	Steingrímur Hermannsson	28 May 1983 – 8 July 1987; 28 September 1988 – 30 April 1991
Ástríður Thorarensen	Davíð Oddsson	30 April 1991 – 15 September 2004
Sigurjóna Sigurðardóttir	Halldór Ásgrímsson	15 September 2004 – 15 June 2006
Inga Jóna Þórðardóttir	Geir Hilmar Haarde	15 June 2006 – 1 February 2009
Jónína Leósdóttir	Jóhanna Sigurðardóttir	1 February 2009 – 23 May 2013
Anna Sigurlaug Pálsdóttir	Sigmundur Davíð Gunnlaugsson	23 May 2013 – 7 April 2016
Ingibjörg Elsa Ingjaldsdóttir	Sigurður Ingi Jóhannsson	7 April 2016 – 11 January 2017
Þóra Margrét Baldvinsdóttir	Bjarni Benediktsson	11 January 2017 – 30 November 2017
Gunnar Sigvaldason	Katrín Jakobsdóttir	30 November 2017 – present
