= Section 178 of the Penal Code of Iceland =

1869 Icelandic law criminalizing homosexuality

- Territorial extent: Iceland
- Effective: 1869
- Repealed: 12 August 1940

Repealed by
- Icelandic Penal Code of 1940
- Status: Repealed

Section 178 of the Penal Code of Iceland was an article of the 1869 Penal Code of Iceland that criminalized "unnatural sexual relations" and was functionally a legal prohibition of same-sex relations, as well as bestiality and sodomy between heterosexual couples. Section 178 was in force from 1869 to 1940, although records have only been found of four men charged under this section, and of whom only one received a sentence.

== Adoption ==
Iceland was part of the Kingdom of Denmark until 1944, whereby the laws of both countries were largely connected. Prior to the adoption of the Penal Code of 1869, Iceland used the Penal Code of King Christian V of Denmark, which punished "sexual intercourse against nature" with the death penalty by burning at the stake. In 1867, the King of Denmark sent to Iceland a proposal for a new Penal Code, although the text was an almost exact translation of the Danish Penal Code of 1866. This proposal included Section 178, which was a translation of section 177 of the Danish counterpart. The text of Section 178 stated:

Unnatural sexual relations shall be punished by forced labor in a correctional facility.

Section 178 was not debated during the Alþingi's discussions on the Penal Code and was passed as part of Chapter 16, which dealt with "crimes against chastity" and included offenses such as incest, rape, and adultery. One difference between Section 178 and the other sections of Chapter 16 was that most of them specified the sex of the accused as male, while Section 178 did not differentiate between the sexes of the participants. However, in practice, it was understood that sexual relations had to include some form of intercourse, so it was assumed that the law only applied to male homosexual relations. No records have been found of any women being charged nor convicted under Section 178.

The Penal Code was officially adopted in 1869.

== Prosecutions ==
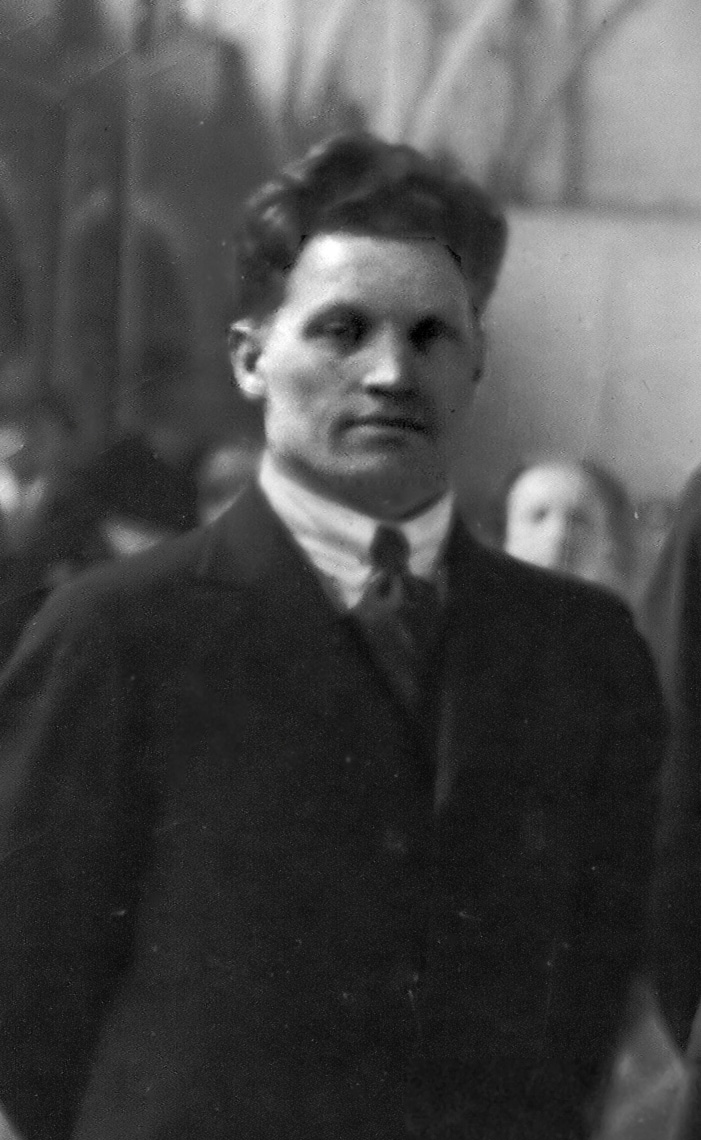
Gordon Sigurjonsson in 1920. He was the only person to have ever been sentenced under Section 178 in Iceland.

The first recorded case of a person being charged with homosexuality under Section 178 occurred in 1924 and involved the athlete Gordon Sigurjonsson, who competed in the 1908 London Olympics and served as a soldier in World War I. In January 1924, a man named Steindór filed a charge against Sigurjonsson for allegedly mistreating patients at the Reykjavík psychiatric hospital, where he worked, as well as for "having sexual relations with the same sex". Steindór also accused Sigurjonsson of trying to "make love to him" and soliciting his affections.

Five witnesses claimed to have had sexual interactions with Sigurjonsson, but he denied the allegations. After a month, the Reykjavík District Court took up the case, where Sigurjonsson continued to deny abusing hospital patients, but admitted to having sexual relations with men during the previous 18 years. The court eventually acquitted him of the abuse charge, but sentenced him to eight months in prison for homosexual acts. Doctors such as Guðmundur Thoroddsen and Guðmundur Björnsson unsuccessfully petitioned the Prime Minister to grant Sigurjonsson a pardon, asserting that Section 178 was outdated and that, scientifically speaking, Sigurjonsson had not committed a crime. Although Sigurjonsson was sentenced to eight months, Icelandic authorities released him after only three.

The three other known Section 178 prosecutions all occurred in 1928, although at least one involved a charge of bestiality and not same-sex sexual relations. The only remaining evidence from the second trial is a letter seeking a pardon for the accused, being described as an "idiot, incapable of learning." The final trial involved a 16-year-old boy accused of raping a six-year-old boy. None of the other three cases resulted in a prison sentence, making Sigurjonsson the only person on record convicted of homosexuality in Iceland.

In August 1935, Sigurjonsson was pardoned by Prime Minister Hermann Jónasson.

== Repeal ==
In 1939, a proposal for a new Penal Code prepared by Supreme Court Justice Thórdur Eyjólfsson was submitted to the Alþingi. The proposal was largely based on the Danish Penal Code of 1930, though with several modifications. Among the changes compared to the 1869 Penal Code was the removal of Section 178, a fact that was mentioned during discussions but did not raise any opposition. The new Penal Code was approved on February 12, 1940, and came into force on August 12 of the same year, thereby decriminalizing same-sex relations.

Although the passage of the 1940 Penal Code decriminalized homosexuality, it also introduced Sections 203 and 207, which established stricter laws in regard to same-sex sexual relations compared to heterosexual relations. Both sections were included in Chapter 22 of the Penal Code, which dealt with "breaches of chastity."

Section 203 was divided into three sections. The first stipulated that if any of the crimes defined in Sections 194 to 198 and the first section of 200 (which referred to various types of rape) were committed in the context of a homosexual relationship, the penalty would be up to six years imprisonment. The second and third sections referred to the age of consent and the definition of statutory rape for same-sex relationships. Regarding the age of consent, the second section established the age of 18 for homosexual relationships, four years older than for heterosexual relationships. The age of victims of statutory rape, which was 14 to 16 in heterosexual relationships, was set at 18 to 21 for same-sex relationships, with a penalty of up to two years imprisonment. Section 207 criminalized homosexual prostitution.

The Alþingi would go on to repeal Sections 203 and 207 in 1992, which meant homosexual relationships in Iceland were now legally equal to heterosexual relationships.

== See also ==
- LGBTQ rights in Iceland

== Bibliographies ==
- Ásta Kristín Benediktsdóttir (2022). "Sódó Reykjavík: How Homosexuality was Brought into Discourse in Early and Mid-Twentieth Century Iceland". NORA. 30 (3): 194–207. doi:10.1080/08038740.2022.2086908. ISSN 0803-8740.
- Digoix, Marie (2020). Same-Sex Families and Legal Recognition in Europe (PDF). Springer International Publishing. doi:10.1007/978-3-030-37054-1_6. hdl:20.500.12204/AXDy74nxUClQnEe2WEyW. ISBN 978-3-030-37054-1. Archived from the original on 2022-01-20.
- Rydström, Jens (2007). Criminally Queer: Homosexuality and Criminal Law in Scandinavia 1842–1999 (PDF). Aksant Academic Publishers. doi:10.26530/oapen_353810. ISBN 978-90-5260-245-5. Archived from the original (PDF) on 2022-07-07.
