= Rósa Ingólfsdóttir =

Icelandic actress (1947–2020)

Rósa Ingólfsdóttir (5 August 1947 – 14 January 2020) was an Icelandic actress.

== Biography ==
Rósa was the daughter of Ingólfur Sveinsson and Klara Halldórsdóttir, the youngest of three siblings. She graduated from the Icelandic School of Drama and Arts and Crafts and was the first artist of State and worked for the Icelandic National Broadcasting Service for many years.

Her biography, Rósumál: Líf og störf Rósu Ingólfsdóttur, was written in 1992 by journalist Jónína Leósdóttir.

== Discography ==
- Rosa (1972)

== Filmography ==
- Message to Sandra (1983)
- Áramótaskaupið 1990 (1990)
- Real Story 7:15 (1991)
- Wallpaper: An Erotic Story (1992)
- In the twilight II (1994)
