= Lana Kolbrún Eddudóttir =

Icelandic LGBTQ activist

Chair of Samtökin '78
- In office 1989–1990
- Preceded by: Þorvaldur Kristinsson
- Succeeded by: Guðrún Gísladóttir

Chair of Samtökin '78
- In office 1993 - 1994
- Preceded by: Þorvaldur Kristinsson
- Succeeded by: Margrét Pála Ólafsdóttir

Personal details
- Born: 1965 (age 60–61)

Lana Kolbrún Eddudóttir (born 1965) is an Icelandic queer activist and radio producer, and former chair of Samtökin '78, Iceland's national queer organisation.

== Early life ==
Lana Kolbrún studied history at the University of Iceland. In 1989 she became the first female and youngest chair of Samtökin '78, and she was on the committee responsible for the recognition of same-sex civil partnerships with Guðni Baldursson.

She lives in Reykjavík.

== Career ==
Lana Kolbrún worked as a radio programme producer for RÚV for many years, where she hosted the music programme Litla flugan among others.

She was the chair of Samtökin '78 from 1989 to 1990, and again from 1993 to 1994.
