= Kif-Kif (organization) =

Moroccan LGBTQ association

- Founded: 2005
- Purpose: Advocacy, Campaigning, Support group
- Region served: Morocco, Spain

Kif-Kif (The Association of Lesbians, Gays, Transgenders and Bisexuals of Morocco) is a non-governmental LGBT rights organization for LGBT Moroccans. Since it is not legally recognized in Morocco, the organization has been licensed and checked in Spain since 2008. On its constitutive act, it is mentioned that its actions include both Spain and Morocco. Although its focus is on homosexual rights, membership is open to everyone who shares its values based on the universal declaration of human rights.

The association is widely criticized from the very conservative parts of Muslim society in the country, even by means of the use of threats, or in some extreme cases; personal violence.

Kif-kif is an expression that means "same" in Moroccan dialect. The organization also operates a magazine titled Mithly (The Arabic word "Mithly" can mean either "similar to me" or "gay").

== History ==
On 1 June 2004, the Moroccan police arrested 43 people in Tetouan under the charge of conducting homosexual activities, in accordance with article 489 of the Moroccan penal code.

As a result, the Moroccan homosexual community started an international online campaign for their liberation. Thousands of letters were sent to media and foreign ambassadors in Morocco. In order to coordinate their actions on the internet, a group named Kif-Kif was created, a discussion room, or forum aiming to help Moroccan citizens who can't find their place in society. In 2005, Kif-Kif was officially created. Starting in 2006, volunteers started their battle for their registration as an association in Morocco, yet all their attempts failed.

Since 2008, a lot of groups were established on the axis of Kif-Kif outside Morocco, by working as independent projects in local LGBT organizations.

In April 2010, Kif-Kif launched Mithly (meaning "homosexual" and "like me" in Arabic), the first Moroccan LGBT magazine, in print and online. The first edition, printed in Rabat, distributed 200 copies in a clandestine way, since article 489 in the penal code judges homosexuality illegal and prohibits the publication of offensive material.

In May 2010, the LGBT members of Kif-Kif created the group Menna w Fena ("From us and for us"), an internal group of the Kif-Kif association which is dedicated specifically to lesbians, bisexuals, transgenders or queer; and has as an objective to protect LGBT women in Morocco and help them assert themselves among the LGBT community.
