= LGBTQ rights in Morocco =

- Morocco and occupied territories
- Legal status: Illegal since 1962
- Penalty: 6 months to 3 years' imprisonment and a fine of 120 to 1,000 dirhams
- Military: No
- Discrimination protections: None

Family rights
- Recognition of relationships: No recognition of same-sex unions
- Adoption: No

Lesbian, gay, bisexual, transgender, and queer (LGBTQ) people in Morocco face significant challenges not experienced by non-LGBTQ residents. Both male and female forms of same-sex sexual activity are illegal in Morocco. Gay and lesbian Moroccans face many hardships in the country, as they have limited legal rights. Moroccan police disproportionately target perceived LGBTQ people, and attitudes towards the wider LGBTQ community remain mostly negative throughout the nation.

== Law regarding same-sex sexual activity ==
Article 489 of the Penal Code of Morocco criminalises "lewd or unnatural acts with an individual of the same sex". Same-sex sexual activity is illegal in Morocco and can be punished with anything from six months to three years' imprisonment and a fine of 120 to 1,200 dirhams. The Moroccan government uses the law as a way to police members of the LGBTQ community. When a person is arrested in Morocco for a suspected homosexual act, their name is publicised, thereby publicly identifying the individual before a trial takes place. The legal status of LGBTQ people living in Morocco stems largely from traditional Islamic morality, which views homosexuality and cross-dressing as signs of immorality.

In 2016, two girls were arrested in Marrakesh after a cousin of one of them took a photo of them kissing on a rooftop. The mother of one of the girls complained to the police, who immediately arrested them. This sparked international outcry and the use of the hashtag #freethegirls. Their case was postponed until December 2016. In early December 2016, the two girls were acquitted.

A 2019 evaluation by the Parliamentary Assembly of the Council of Europe on its partnership with the Moroccan Parliament, called upon Morocco to stop enforcing sections of its criminal code that "criminalise sexual relations between adults of the same sex or between adults of different sexes who are not related by marriage" until their eventual repeal.

== Government policy ==
None of the major or minor political parties have made public statements in favour of LGBTQ rights and no LGBTQ rights legislation has been enacted. Government attitudes towards homosexuality tend to be in the interests of the protection of the tradition of the country, in keeping with the culture's traditional gender roles and religious morals. It has banned books on homosexuality and required schools to teach a curriculum that "emphasises ... the danger and depravity of 'unnatural acts'". On 21 March 2008, a statement issued by the Ministry of Interior reinforced the government's intention to "preserve citizens' ethics and defend our society against all irresponsible actions that mar our identity and culture".

In foreign policy, the government opposed the participation of an international gay and lesbian rights representative at the 2001 United Nations Conference on AIDS-HIV. They also opposed a United Nations joint statement condemning violence against LGBTQ people.

== Recognition of same-sex relationships ==
There is no legal recognition of same-sex couples in the country.

== Discrimination protections ==
There is no law against discrimination or harassment on the basis of sexual orientation or gender identity in Morocco.

== Gender identity and expression ==
Traditional cultural and religious mores tend to associate cross-dressing with homosexuality. Culturally, certain forms of cross-dressing have been tolerated in areas where women were not a part. The initial lack of female actors meant that the roles often went to men, who were generally assumed to be homosexual, but were shown a modicum of tolerance.

In the 1950s, the publicity surrounding French actress and entertainer Coccinelle helped to establish Casablanca as being a place where certain doctors were willing to perform sex change operations, albeit in clandestine circumstances.

According to a 2014 survey conducted by the TNS Foundation for Morocan magazine TelQuel, 83% of Moroccans hold negative views towards homosexuals. According to the 2025 tolerance index published by Afrobarometer, nearly 80% of Moroccans reject homosexuality.

== Conviction history ==
Moroccan public opinion towards the LGBTQ community is generally negative, in alignment with attitudes about LGBTQ rights in much of the Muslim world. The country has a male-dominated culture, a patriarchal society with traditional gender roles, that prefers a male and a female to get married and have children. The government has sporadically continued to enforce the laws on homosexuality with occasional public arrests carried out in routine fashion.

A court in Ksar el-Kebir, a small city about 120 kilometres (75 mi) south of Tangier, convicted six men on 10 December 2007 of violating article 489 of Morocco's penal code. However, according to the defendants' lawyers, the prosecution failed to present any evidence that the men actually had engaged in the prohibited conduct.

The men were sentenced to varying terms on 17 December 2007, after a video circulated online—including on YouTube—purporting to show a private party, allegedly including the men, taking place in Ksar el-Kebir on 18 November. Press reports claimed the party was a "gay marriage". Following the arrests, dozens of men and women marched through the streets of Ksar el-Kebir, denouncing the men's alleged actions and calling for their punishment.

In 2010, the government permitted openly gay singer Elton John to give a performance during the Mawazine Festival, despite objections from the Justice and Development Party, which was, at the time, the biggest opposition party in parliament. The festival was condoned by King Mohammed VI and was a part of the king's plans to create a more open and modern nation.

Abdellah Taïa and Rachid O., both successful writers, have written openly about gender roles and sexual identity in Morocco, but they do not reside in Morocco. Beyond these writers, the government has tolerated the existence of one magazine for the gay community as well as one gay rights organization. The LGBTQ publication Mithly has been allowed to be discreetly distributed to adults in Morocco, although the government still will not grant the publication a distribution license and the magazine itself has to be made in neighboring Spain. In a similar sense, the government will not officially recognize the LGBTQ rights organization, Kif-Kif, but has allowed it to exist and co-sponsor some educational seminars.

In 2017, following the United Nations' Universal Periodic Review in Geneva, Mustafa Ramid, former Minister of Justice and Liberties in Abdelilah Benkirane's and Saadeddine Othmani's governments, called homosexuals "trash" in an interview. This was criticised by local human rights associations which together signed a petition addressed to the Prime Minister of Morocco Othmani to open an investigation of Minister Ramid "on his discriminatory and unconstitutional statements towards sexual minorities".

In the 2018–19 Arab Barometer survey, 21% of the Moroccan respondents said homosexuality is acceptable.

In April 2020 the Human Rights Watch reported of a campaign of online harassment in Morocco where people would go on same-sex dating apps to out other users, and on April 24, the Sûreté Nationale (Moroccan national security) stated that the police had opened a "preliminary investigation" for "incitement to hatred and discrimination".

In April 2020, the Moroccan transgender influencer Sofia Talouni, who lives in Turkey and is followed by more than 600,000 people on Instagram, launched a denunciation campaign to outrage Moroccan homosexuals, stating: "You will burn in hell ". She incited her subscribers to create false accounts on gay dating applications and to reveal the identity of those who are there on social networks. The act has been questioned, insofar as Sofia Talouni is herself from the LGBTQ community. According to sociologist Khalid Mouna, she "tries to make her group undergo the same family rupture by adopting the discourse and the codes of her own detractors. This individual, obviously mentally unstable, wishes to isolate young Moroccan homosexuals by breaking up their family unit". The journalist Hicham Tahir indicates that he has received "a hundred testimonies from people who were victims or direct witnesses of this campaign". Some landlords ejected their tenants, while one person allegedly committed suicide. Moroccan LGBTQ associations denounced the campaign as homophobic. Moroccan police launched a preliminary investigation for "incitement to hatred and discrimination". On May 13, Talouni released a video where she apologized for the campaign. Instagram nevertheless suspended her account.

In November 2022, a trans woman was violently beaten by a group of people in Tangier. Three minors and an adult were subsequently arrested in connection with the assault.

== Advocacy for LGBTQ rights ==
Kif-Kif is the only organization to advocate on behalf of the LGBTQ community in Morocco and publishes the Mithly magazine in Spain. Established in 2004, it has not been given legal recognition by the Department of the Interior, but it has been unofficially permitted to organize certain educational seminars.

== Summary table ==
Same-sex sexual activity legal	No (Penalty: up to 3 years' imprisonment and fine)
Equal age of consent	No
Anti-discrimination laws in employment only	No
Anti-discrimination laws in the provision of goods and services	No
Anti-discrimination laws in all other areas (Incl. indirect discrimination, hate speech)	No
Same-sex marriages	No
Same-sex civil unions	No
Recognition of same-sex couples	No
Step-child adoption by same-sex couples	No
Joint adoption by same-sex couples	No
Gays and lesbians allowed to serve openly in the military	No
Right to change legal gender	Yes / No Intersex recognized since 2021
Access to IVF for lesbians	No
Commercial surrogacy for gay male couples	No (Illegal for all couples regardless of sexual orientation)
MSMs allowed to donate blood	No

== See also ==
- Human rights in Morocco
- Human rights in Western Sahara — Morocco occupies 80 percent of this disputed territory
- LGBTQ rights in Africa
