= Samtökin '78 =

Icelandic LGBT organisation

Samtökin '78, officially The National Queer Organization in English, is the national queer organization of Iceland and non-governmental organization dedicated to the interest and rights of Queer individuals in Iceland. The organization provides education about LGBTQIA+ related matters, counselling and legal consultation for queer people in addition to running a youth club for young people that identify as queer and hosting open houses once a week intended for queer people and their allies.

== Organization ==
The first chairperson of the group was Guðni Baldursson. As of March 2022, the chairperson of the organization was Álfur Birkir, succeeding Þorbjörg Þorvaldsdóttir. In April 2022, the organisation had four employees. As of 2020, it also had ten contractors. As of 2018, the group's executive director was Daníel E. Arnarsson. Lana Kolbrún Eddudóttir was the youngest chair (1989-1990), and she became the chair for the second time from 1993 to 1994.

The organisation receives funding from the government for providing education, consultation, and services. In 2017, the national government of Iceland granted them 6 million Icelandic króna (ISK). This was doubled to a grant of 12 million in 2018. They then received a grant of 15 million ISK in 2019. In 2020, it came to an agreement with the government of Reykjavík to receive 8.7 million ISK annually, for three years.

== Relationship with other LGBT organisations ==
The organisation has a number of partnered groups that it collaborates with. These include Hinsegin dagar, HIN – Hinsegin Norðurland, Trans Ísland, Intersex Ísland, Q – félag hinsegin stúdenta (the affiliated queer students' organization), BDSM á Íslandi, Hinsegin kórinn, and Íþróttafélagið Styrmir. At least some of these, such as the students' group that was founded in 1999, operated as independent subgroups within Samtökin '78.

A separate lobby group named Samtökin '22 was established in 2022 in opposition to Samtökin '78's advocacy for transgender people, modelled on the LGB Alliance's split from Stonewall in the United Kingdom. Daníel E. Arnarsson, the executive director of Samtökin '78, accused the new organisation of hate speech and stated it should be placed on a public list of extremist organisations. Between 2023 and 2025, Samtökin '78 filed criminal complaints against five individuals associated with Samtökin '22, in relation to alleged instances of hate speech and defamation.

== History ==
Samtökin '78 - The National Organization for Lesbians and Gay Men in Iceland was founded on May 2, 1978 primarily by Hörður Torfason as a scene for the social life of gay people and the fight for gay rights in Iceland. Its name and original rulebook were inspired by that of Forbundet af 1948, a Danish organization that was also named after the year it was founded. At founding, the group had twenty members who were all men. However, a number of women joined in the first year, and the amount of gay men and lesbians eventually became about equal.

The first declaration published by the group stated, "We, lesbians and gay men in Iceland, want to share our knowledge with other homosexuals, to strengthen their understanding of themselves, and to encourage them to strengthen their self-respect. We want to increase awareness of our situation in the society at large so people will understand that we are a normal part of society. We want to enjoy the full ethical and legal rights; without discrimination, but we don't ask for special treatment."

In March 1978, the organization was denied publication of an advertisement for its meeting by the national radio service, RÚV. The group lobbied for usage of their preferred terms for "lesbians" and "gays" ("lesbíur" and "hommar"), as opposed to the derogatory phrase "kynvillingar", which meant "sexual deviants", that the radio service would have required them to use in order to publish an advertisement. The national radio service then argued that they should use "proper Icelandic" rather than language that "violates popular taste and decency" if they wished to publish an advertisement. This debate continued for years.

Samtökin '78 orchestrated a campaign to bring wider visibility to gay people in Iceland, staging meetings and debates about gay and lesbian topics. Before the existence of the organization, gay people were rarely discussed in Iceland. The first public protests held by the organization took place in 1982, in Reykjavík. They were supported by gay rights organizations in other Nordic countries.

During the HIV/AIDS crisis in Iceland, there was a split in the organisation between some of its gay men and lesbians due to the focus on HIV-related issues at that time. A splinter group for lesbians called Íslensk Lesbíska was formed. According to Thorvaldur Kristinsson, who had been the chairperson of the organization at that time, "What happened here was, as far as I understand, somewhat opposite to what happened in the [United States], where the AIDS crisis brought men and women together. The girls [here] complained repeatedly about being left behind. They didn’t participate, they couldn't involve themselves in the AIDS work. They didn’t sense the fear and desperation that we did." At that time, the organization was involved with educating people on the topic of HIV/AIDS, including its own membership.

In 1992 the organization allowed bisexual people to join, and in 2007 transgender people were also welcomed. Subsequently the organization changed its name to Samtökin '78 - The National Queer Organization of Iceland. Torfason left the group in 1993, and later criticised aspects of the group. The group helped to legalize gay civil unions in Iceland. In 1996, the group organized a celebration of the first gay couples to receive registered civil unions in the country. The event was supported by the government of Reykjavík and attended by many notable Icelandic figures such as presidential candidates, religious leaders, and celebrities.

In 2010, the group granted a human rights award to the Church of Iceland after 111 religious leaders signed an article supporting gay marriage. In August 2015, the organization ran a contest called Hýryrði 2015 (Queer Words 2015) attempting to translate sixteen LGBT+ phrases into the Icelandic language. The results were announced on Icelandic Language Day. The contest has since then been held every year. In 2015, the group experienced a conflict with the Church of Iceland about whether ministers should be able to refuse to approve a gay marriage. That year, the organization held educational lectures at 29 of Iceland's schools.

In 2020, they released a survey of LGBT youth reporting their experiences with harassment and assault. In June 2021, they awarded a badge to former Prime Minister of Iceland Jóhanna Sigurðardóttir as the first openly gay head of government in the world. In September 2021, the group assessed each of Iceland's political parties' platforms, based on how thoroughly they addressed LGBT issues. As of 2021, the group also compiled data on suspected hate crimes in Iceland, in the absence of officially collected statistics by the national government. The group has lobbied for the government to collect this information and to create a program to prevent these incidents from occurring.

== See also ==
- LGBT rights in Iceland
