= Jónína Leósdóttir =

Icelandic writer (born 1954)

- Born: 16 May 1954 (age 72); Iceland
- Occupations: novelist playwright journalist
- Spouse: Jóhanna Sigurðardóttir
- Website: joninaleosdottir.com

Jónína Leósdóttir (born 16 May 1954) is an Icelandic novelist, playwright, former journalist and spouse of former Prime Minister of Iceland Jóhanna Sigurðardóttir (2009–2013).

She is the author of a dozen plays, eleven novels, two biographies and a collection of articles she originally wrote for a women's magazine. Her books have been translated into several languages.

She is married to the former Icelandic Prime Minister Jóhanna Sigurðardóttir, who was the first openly lesbian head of government in modern history. They were one of the first same-sex couples in Iceland to get married (in 2010, shortly after the law took effect, and while Jóhanna was in office); and until 2015, Jónína was the only modern person to have been the same-sex spouse of a sitting head of government (Belgium's Elio Di Rupo has never been married, while Luxembourg's Xavier Bettel was unable to legally marry until 1 January 2015). The pair met in 1983.

Jónina published the biography of Rósa Ingólfsdóttir in 1992. Her book, Sundur og saman (Back and Forth) appeared in 1993. The book was about a child whose parents divorced. She has written a book about her relationship with the former prime minister.

She has a BA in English and Literature from the University of Iceland, and has worked at the University of Essex.
