= March for Diversity =

Public LGBTQ+ demonstrations in Montevideo

March for Diversity in Uruguay
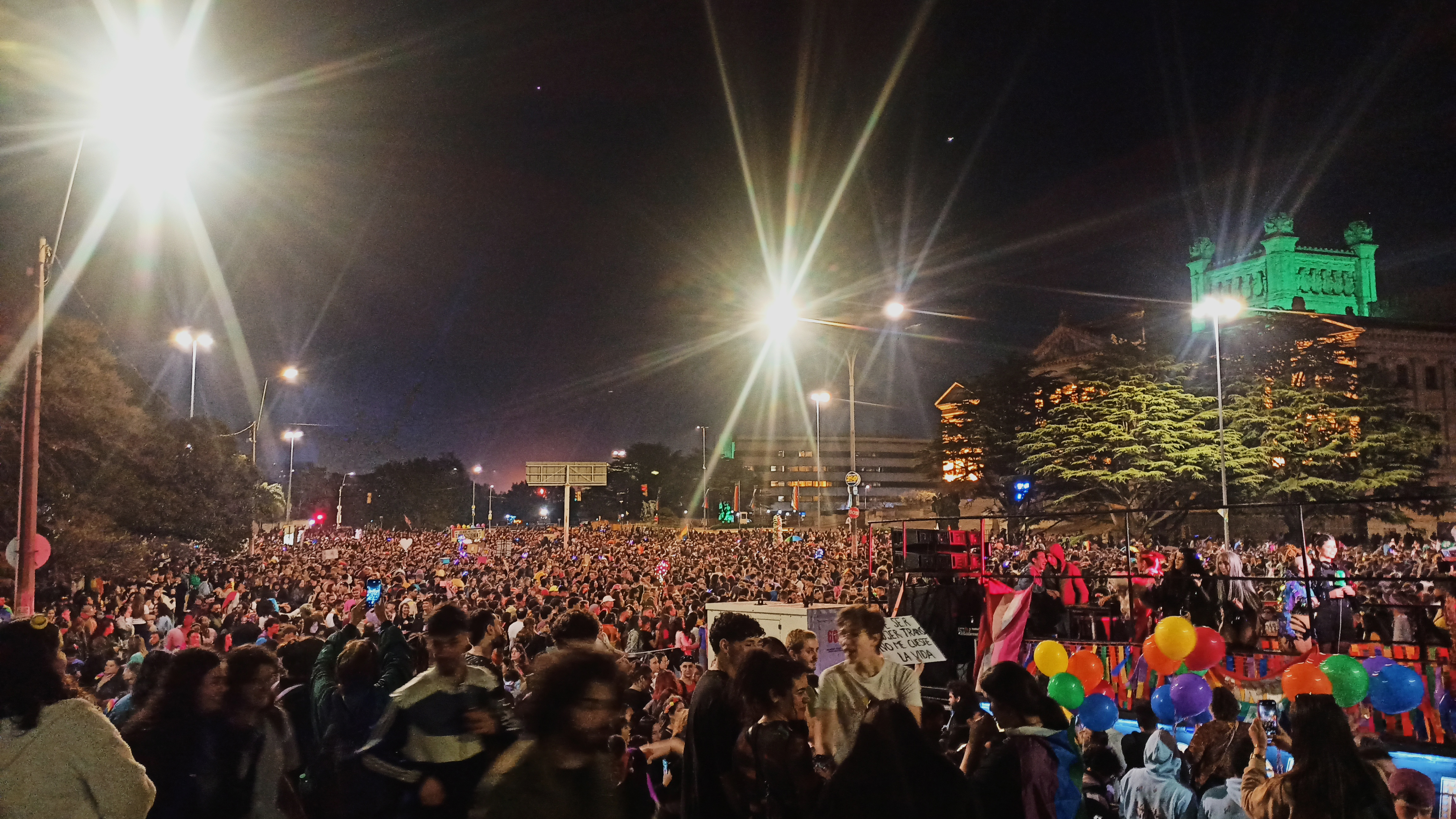
- 2024 edition of the March for Diversity
- Locations: Montevideo, Uruguay
- Inaugurated: 1992

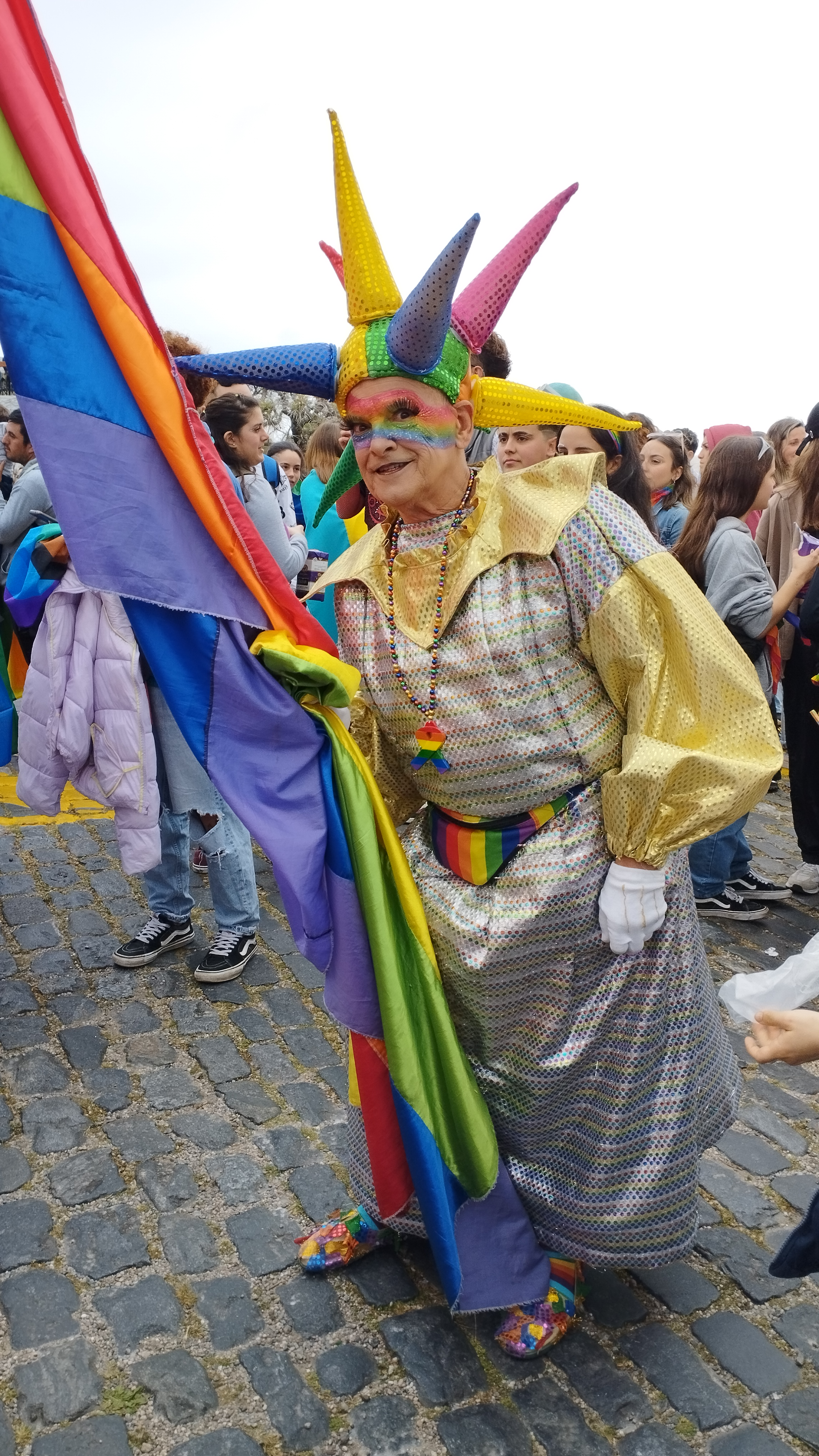
Roberto Acosta, LGBT activist, known as the Harlequin who leads the Marches for Diversity, and who was declared an illustrious figure of the city of Montevideo.

The March for Diversity (Spanish: Marcha por la Diversidad) is a public demonstration held annually in the city of Montevideo on the last Friday of September since 2005. In recent years, it has also expanded to other parts of the country.

It is the second-largest annual demonstration in Uruguay in terms of attendance, surpassed only by the March of Silence. The event takes place as part of the activities held during Diversity Month and was declared of ministerial interest by the Ministry of Social Development (MIDES) in 2012.

== Characteristics and history ==
The event is organized by the Coordinating Committee for the March for Diversity, which brings together social organizations advocating for the expansion of rights for members of Uruguay's LGBT community. These groups fight for "a pluralistic society in which different ways of being are recognized and valued." In this spirit, the organizers state that "the march is not only a celebration of sexual diversity, but also a commitment to the broader struggle for a more egalitarian society in every sense."

The march currently begins at Plaza de Cagancha, where the "March Pre-Event" is also organized. This includes stands and activities that start the day before and continue until the time of departure. The event ends at Plaza Primero de Mayo, in front of the Legislative Palace of Uruguay. In 2017, the main demand was for the passage of a Comprehensive Law for Trans People. In 2019, the rallying cry was "Fear is not the way."

The steadily growing turnout year after year is one of the main reasons the march is now also being held in other cities across Uruguay. These include Colonia del Sacramento, the cities of Las Piedras and Santa Lucía in the department of Canelones, and the cities of Minas and José Pedro Varela in the department of Lavalleja, among others.

The first precedent was a gathering in Plaza Libertad in Montevideo on June 28, 1992, held in recognition of International LGBT Pride Day. The first march took place the following year, named the Homosexual Pride March, and the Montevideo Departmental Government authorized it to proceed from the Obelisk to the esplanade of the University of the Republic, under heavy police surveillance.

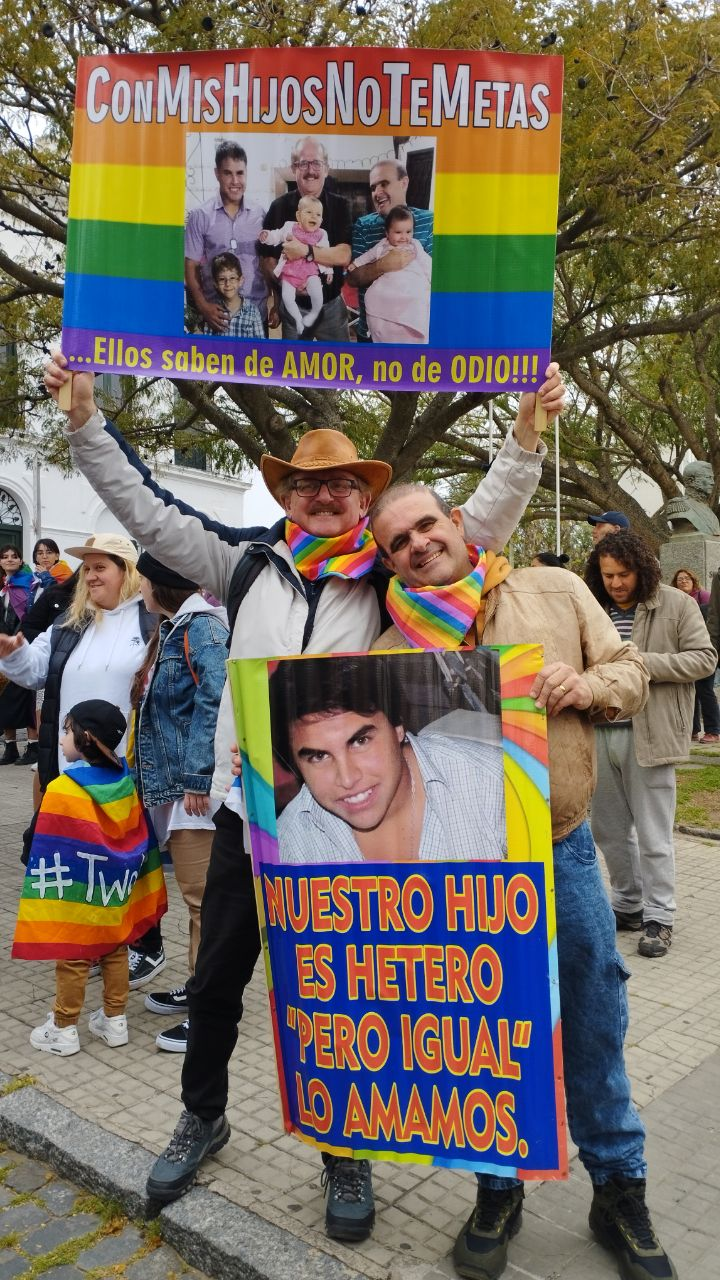
Rubén and Mario, LGBT activists who became the first same-sex couple to legally adopt a child in Latin America.

In 1997, with the support of city council members Margarita Percovich and Jorge Zabalza, the march organizers succeeded in having the Montevideo Departmental Board establish the first Diversity Week. The event broadened the conversation to include other groups, such as Afro-descendants, women, and people living with HIV. According to D'Avenia, "At that time, reflecting a regional trend, the term 'gay pride' began to be replaced, not just in form but in content, by 'sexual diversity.' In the 1990s, the debate on depathologization gave way to a new political stance: the issue was no longer merely discrimination, but civil and human rights. These changes led to the March for Diversity beginning to diverge from the Gay Pride March. The decision, which caused some division, was backed by a Latin American consensus that each community should have its own reference dates."

Roberto Acosta has had a long trajectory as an activist within the LGBT community. He is widely recognized as the person who leads the marches dressed as a Harlequin, wearing a hat in the colors of diversity and carrying the rainbow flag that symbolizes the LGBT movement. On September 26, 2018, he was officially declared an Illustrious Citizen of the city of Montevideo. On that occasion, it was said of him: "He has become a symbol of past struggles, of the progress made in recent years, and of the demands that guide the present and future of the movement for diversity and equality."

Miguel and Mario are a married gay activist couple who have participated in the March for Diversity since its first edition in 1992. Originally from Mercedes, they adopted Camilo in 1997, becoming the first homoparental family in the Americas to legally adopt a child.

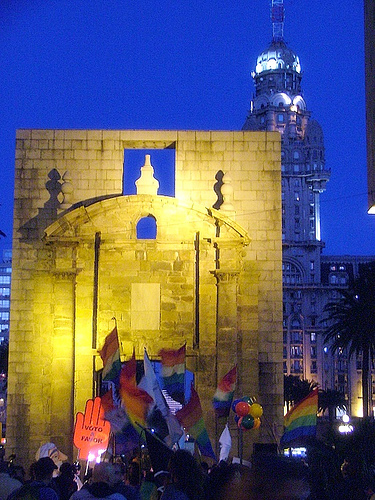
Photo of the 2006 march in front of the Puerta de la Ciudadela.

=== March for Diversity Coordination Committee ===
The Coordinadora de la Marcha por la Diversidad (March for Diversity Coordination Committee) was created in 2004 after many years of discussion. It was formed by social organizations with common goals: “the expansion of rights in society, the advocacy for a secular state, and the promotion of a culture that is inclusive and free from discrimination based on ethnicity, class, or any other grounds.”

In the 2017 official declaration, the committee stated:

We understand that diversity is a value in itself that encompasses all the struggles we must undertake to live in a more equal society. That is why the March for Diversity represents a celebration of freedom, of differences, of multiplicity—a joyful display of a varied, pluralistic society, always in a spirit of joy and respect. It is an invitation to build a world free of discrimination, free of hierarchies, free of injustice: an egalitarian world.

In 2016, the organizations that formed the Coordination Committee included: Ovejas Negras, Mujeres en el Horno, Mizangas, Proderechos, Unión Trans del Uruguay (UTRU), Área Académica Queer, FEUU (Federation of University Students of Uruguay), Gender Secretariat of the PIT-CNT, the Uruguayan Network of Positive Youth and Adolescents (RUJAP), Llamale H, and Multimostro Colectivo.

In 2017, the March for Diversity Coordination Committee was composed of the following groups: Ovejas Negras, Mizangas, Mujeres en el Horno, Proderechos, Unión Trans del Uruguay (UTRU), FEUU, the Gender Department of the PIT-CNT, the Uruguayan Network of Positive Youth and Adolescents (RUJAP), Multimostro Colectivo, La Garganta Poderosa Uruguay, MásVIHdas, the Youth Department of the PIT-CNT, Colectivo Catalejo, Cotidiano Mujer, and Colectiva Disonante.

In 2018, the groups that formed part of the Coordinadora included: Ovejas Negras, Mizangas, Mujeres en el Horno, FEUU, the Gender Department of the PIT-CNT, Multimostro Colectivo, Encuentro de Feministas Diversas, MediaRed, GEDUCA, ATRU (Asociación Trans del Uruguay), the Council of the Charrúa Nation of Uruguay, Celeste Deporte y Diversidad, ADASU Uruguay, MásVIHdas, the Youth Department of the PIT-CNT, Colectivo Catalejo, and Cotidiano Mujer.

In 2024, the March for Diversity Coordinating Committee was composed of 15 organizations: Asociación de Asistentes Sociales del Uruguay; Celebro la Diversidad Santa Lucía; Colectivo Diverso de Las Piedras; Montevideo Gay Men's Chorus; Youth Department of the PIT-CNT; Federation of University Students of Uruguay; Grupo Visión Nocturna; Migues Diverso; Organization of Sex Workers; Ovejas Negras; Gender, Equity and Sexual Diversity Secretariat of the PIT-CNT; Servicio Paz y Justicia; Trans Boys Uruguay; Unión Trans-Disidente Maldonado/Montevideo; and Uruguay Fetish.

March for Diversity by City and Year of Inception
Locality	Department	Since
Bella Unión	Artigas	2023
Castillos	Rocha	2022
Colonia	Colonia	2016
Chuy	Rocha	2023
Durazno	Durazno	2023
Las Piedras	Canelones	2015
Melo	Cerro Largo	2019
Migues	Canelones	2023
Minas	Lavalleja	2023
Montevideo	Montevideo	1993
Pando	Canelones	2023
Paysandú	Paysandú	2023
Rivera	Rivera	2017
Rocha	Rocha	2023
San Carlos	Maldonado	2021
Santa Lucía	Canelones	2023
Salto	Salto	2008
Tacuarembó	Tacuarembó	2023
Treinta y Tres	Treinta y Tres	2021
Trinidad	Flores	2023
Young	Río Negro	2023

=== Month of Diversity ===
In Resolution No. 5377/08 issued in 2008 by the Municipality of Montevideo, the month of September was officially declared as the Month of Sexual Diversity.

The Ministry of Education and Culture (MEC), in collaboration with other ministries, the Supreme Court of Justice, the Congress of Intendants, ANEP, CODICEN, the University of the Republic, and various civil society organizations, forms part of the National Coordinating Council for Sexual Diversity. This council was created on December 2, 2015, by the then President of the Republic and is led by the National Directorate for Sociocultural Promotion under the Ministry of Social Development (MIDES).

== Slogans ==
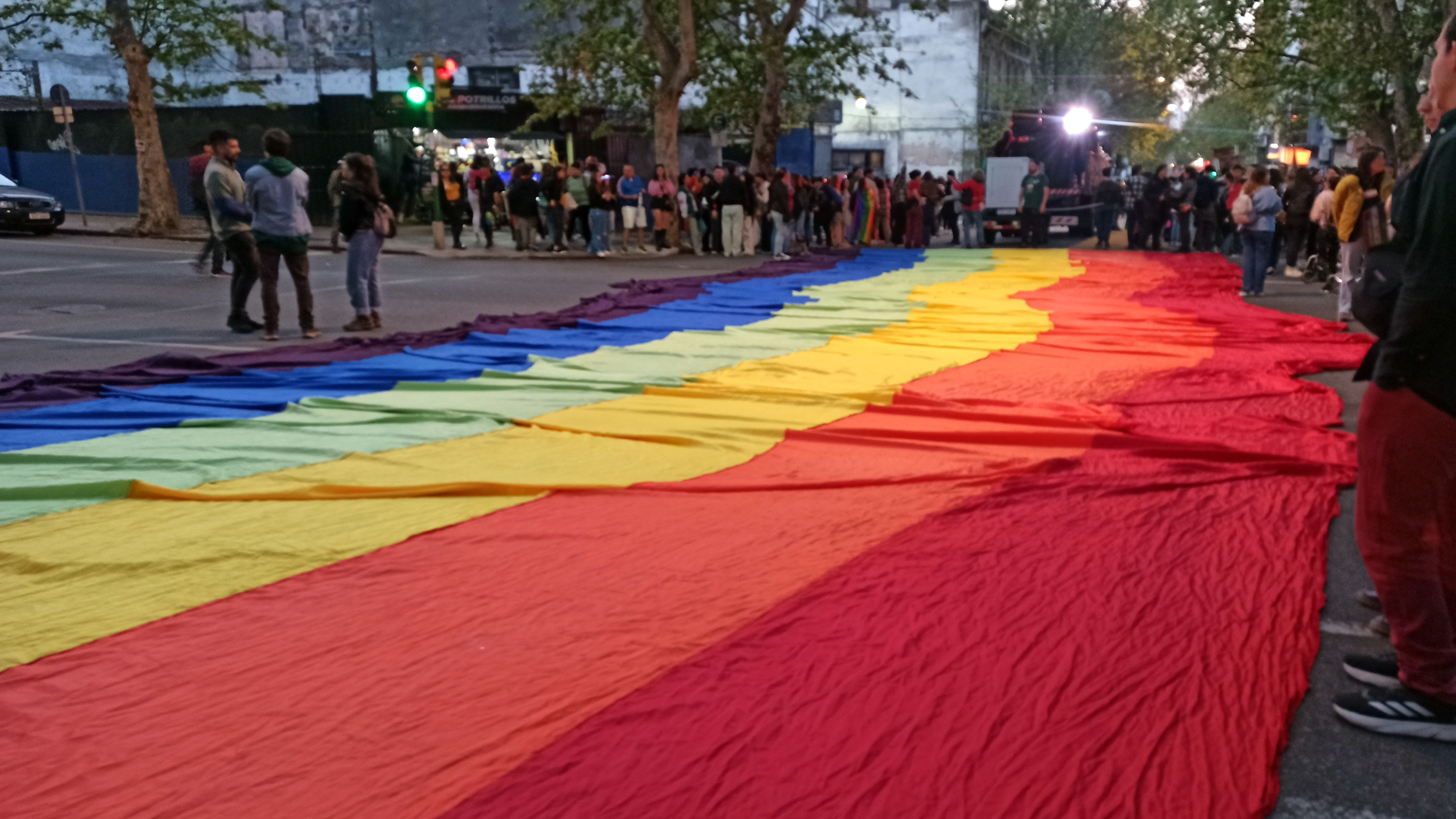
Traditional diversity flag used in the marches. 27/9/2024

- 2024, Until Rights Become Reality
- 2023, Enough of Impunity and the Plundering of Rights
- 2022, The Streets Are Ours, the State Must Respond
- 2021, Absent State, Our Struggle Is Present. This edition of the march was named in honor of Gloria Álvez Mariño.
- 2020, Pride Means Struggle
- 2019, Never Back in the Closet
- 2018, Trans Law Nowǃ
- 2017, Diversity Is Struggle and Resistance. For a Comprehensive Law for Trans People.
- 2016, Discrimination Is Also Violence – Don’t Let Indifference Win!
- 2015, 10 Years of Joy and Rebellion – Now Let’s Educate in Diversity!
- 2014, Not a Single Vote for Discrimination – Rights Must Not Be Rolled Back
- 2013, If You Fight, Nothing Is Impossible
- 2012, From Words to Action: Free and Equal in Dignity and Rights
- 2011, 200 Years Together
- 2010, The Same Duties... The Same Rights
- 2009, In Every Kiss, a Revolution
- 2008, Love Cannot Be Cured
- 2007, With the Strength of Unity, in the History of Diversity
- 2006, Because Without Diversity, There Is No Democracy

== See also ==
- Same-sex marriage in Uruguay
- Sexual diversity in Uruguay
