= LGBTQ history in Uruguay =

In the late 19th century, Uruguay criminalized homosexuality with a penalty of imprisonment. Although it was decriminalized in 1934, social persecution continued for decades. From the 1980s onward, the LGBTQ community started organizing with the creation of several advocacy groups and public spaces for the community.

In the 21st century, Uruguay has introduced major legal reforms, including anti-discrimination, legalizing same-sex marriages and granting them equal rights. The country has been rated as one of the most LGBTQ-friendly nations in Latin America.

== Late 19th and 20th centuries ==
In 1889, the Criminal Code of the Eastern Republic of Uruguay was promulgated, in which the Article no. 278 criminalized sodomy and homosexuality, punishable with a prison sentence of four to six years.

In 1934, Law 9414 was enacted which decriminalized homosexuality and established the equal age of consent for all, regardless of their sexual orientation or gender identity. While legally it was decriminalized, the LGBTQ community still faced persecution. In 1976, the police chief of Montevideo ordered the arrest of more than 300 homosexuals in the city, while describing it as "cleansing of the city from the pernicious activity of homosexuality".

In the 1980s, significant progress was seen in the fight for LGBTQ rights in the country. In 1984, Fundación Escorpio del Uruguay (Scorpio Foundation of Uruguay), the first LGBTQ organization in the country, was founded, which played a major role in defending the rights of the community. That same year, Mefisto, the first LGBTQ nightclub, was inaugurated in Montevideo, and the place became an important meeting point for the community. Several rainbow bars developed as safe havens for the community in the late 1980s. In 1988, Homosexuals Unidos was founded to defend the rights of homosexuals, in the face of increased police persecution on the community. In 1993, the first Gay Pride March was held in Montevideo, one of the first public and open demonstration by the community in the country.

== Later years ==
In the 21st century, significant legal reform was enacted. In 2004, Law 17817 was enacted, which declared the fight against discrimination based on sexual orientation and gender identity as a topic of national interest In 2008, the Civil Union Act came into force, which granted legal recognition and made them eligible for getting health benefits, inheritance, parental rights, and pensions. In 2009, reform in the military code allowed LGBTQ people to serve in the armed forces. In the same year, transgender people over the age of 18 were allowed to legally change their name and gender in the official documents without the need for gender affirming surgery or hormone therapies.

In 2013, the equal marriage law was enacted which made Uruguay the first country in Latin America to legalize same-sex marriage and grant them similar rights equal to heterosexual marriages. In the same year, Spartacus International Gay Guide classified Uruguay as the leading country in Latin America in terms of social acceptance of the LGBTQ community, and highlighted it as a potentially attractive destination for LGBTQ tourism, where people in this community can feel welcome and accepted.

In 2016, Uruguay received international recognition from Americas Quarterly as the most LGBT-friendly country in Latin America. In the same year, the country hosted the first international conference on LGBT rights with the participation of political leaders and activists from around the world. In 2018, the Comprehensive Law for Trans People was passed in the parliament, which granted equal rights for transgender people in the country. In 2019, there was a referendum to call a popular consultation against the Comprehensive Law, which was unsuccessful.

As per the World Bank, Uruguay has made progress in including the LGBTQ community through progressive laws that reduce discrimination, and although there are persistent challenges, the country had stood out for its focus on collecting data on LGBTI inclusion. It also said that the country has shown that promoting LGBTI rights is not only an act of justice, but also carries significant economic and social benefits.

== See also ==
- LGBT rights in the Americas
- LGBTQ rights in Uruguay
- Same-sex marriage in Uruguay
