= Karina Pankievich =

Uruguayan trans activist and a human rights defender

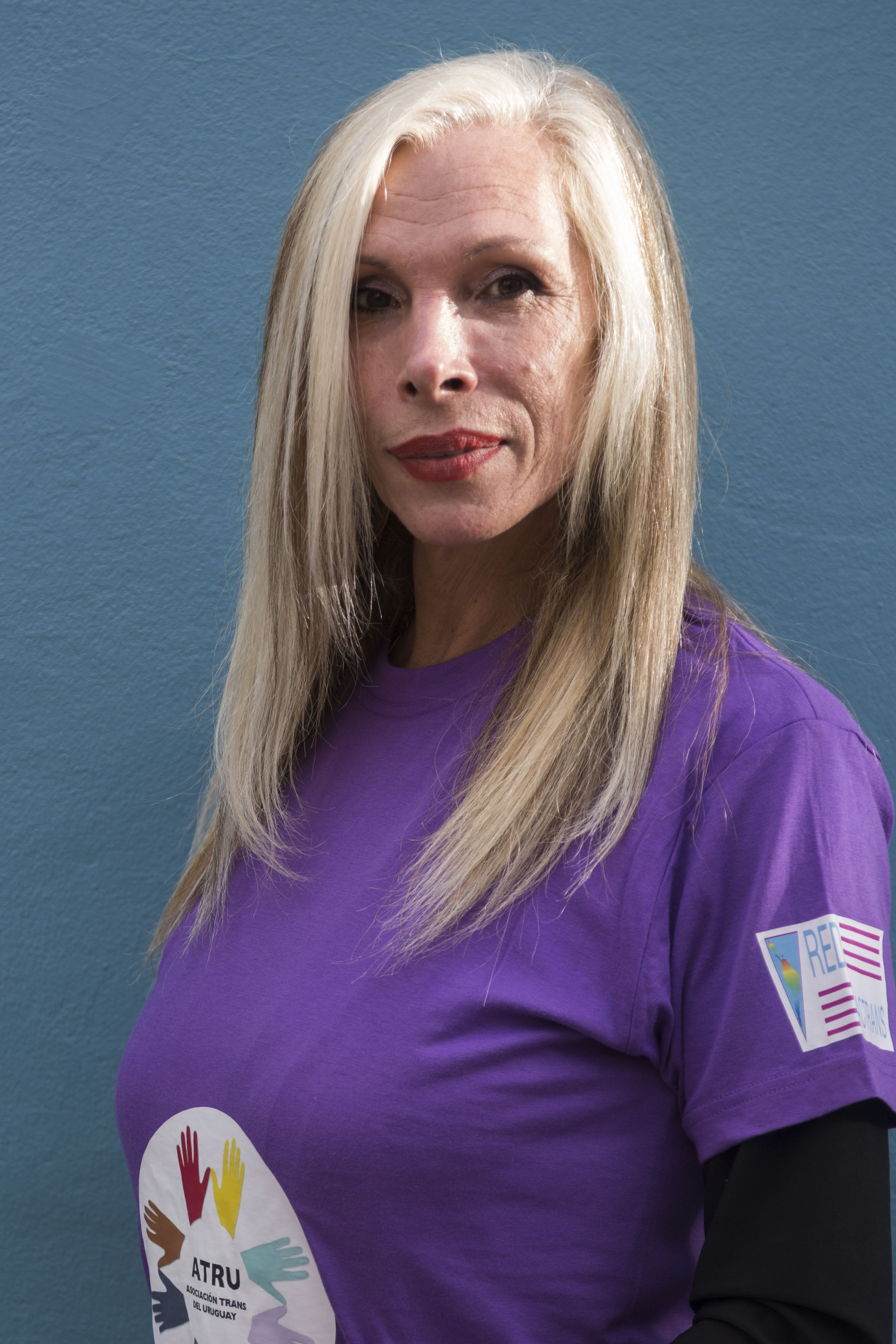
Karina Pankievich

Karina Pankievich is a Uruguayan trans rights activist. She is the president of Trans Association of Uruguay (Spanish: Asociación Trans del Uruguay, ATRU).

== Life ==
Karina moved to Montevideo at the age of 13. Since the age of 15 years, she worked as a sex worker during the dictatorship in Uruguay. The violence and oppression she faced led her to leave Uruguay. Karina moved to Brazil and Argentina, then returned to Uruguay in 1985 and found that many people in the LGBTI community wanted to fight for their human rights, but were afraid. Therefore, Karina and other activists, such as Gloria Álvez Mariño, founded the ATRU in the same year. ATRU focuses on training, supporting and mobilizing activists to promote and defend their rights.

== Works ==
ATRU is a network of trans rights groups throughout the country and reaching other countries in South America. One of the group's biggest successes was the Diversity March, which celebrates the LGBTI community in Uruguay. In 2019, the Diversity March involved more than 130,000 people. She participated in a documentary project titled "Trans women without transphobia against HIV - AIDS" for the Trans National Base Organization (OTBN). This documentary covers cases of trans women human rights violations during 2017 in Uruguay. In 2018, the trans community in Uruguay obtained a law that guaranteed their rights. In 2019, the Parliament of Uruguay wanted to revoke the referendum.

== See also ==
- LGBT rights in Uruguay
