= LGBTQ rights in Uruguay =

- Uruguay
- Legal status: Legal since 1934
- Gender identity: Transgender people allowed to change legal gender without a diagnosis, hormone therapy, sterilization or surgery
- Military: LGBTQ+ allowed to serve openly
- Discrimination protections: Sexual orientation or identity protections since 2004 (see below)

Family rights
- Recognition of relationships: Civil unions since 2008; Same-sex marriage since 2013
- Adoption: Full adoption rights since 2009

Lesbian, gay, bisexual, transgender, and queer (LGBTQ) rights in Uruguay rank among the highest in the world. Same-sex sexual activity has been legal with an equal age of consent since 1934. Anti-discrimination laws protecting LGBT people have been in place since 2004. Civil unions for same-sex couples have been allowed since 2008 and same-sex marriages since 2013, in accordance with the nation's same-sex marriage law passed in early 2013. Additionally, same-sex couples have been allowed to jointly adopt since 2009 and gay, lesbian and bisexual people are allowed to serve openly in the military. Finally, in 2018, a new law guaranteed the human rights of the trans population.

In 2016, Americas Quarterly named Uruguay the most LGBT-friendly country in Latin America, calling the nation "a model for social inclusion in Latin America". It also hosted the first international LGBT rights conference in the region in July 2016, with hundreds of diplomats, politicians and activists from around the world addressing LGBT issues. A large majority of Uruguayans support same-sex marriage.

== Law regarding same-sex sexual activity ==
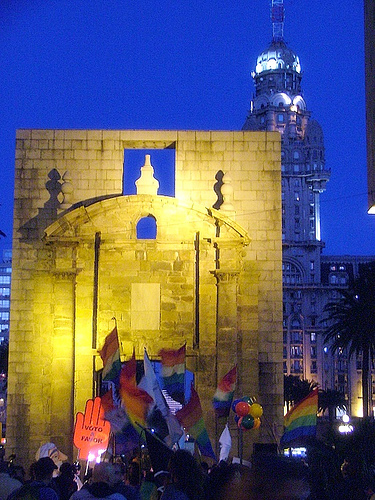
Gay Pride Day in Montevideo, Uruguay.

Same-sex sexual activity was decriminalized in 1934. The age of consent became equal at 15, regardless of sexual orientation and/or gender.

== Recognition of same-sex relationships ==
Same-sex couples have been allowed to marry since August 2013, and have had access to civil unions, which do not grant all the benefits and responsibilities of marriage, since 2008.

Uruguay was the first Latin American country to legalize civil unions under national legislation. Under the legislation, couples must be together for at least five years and sign a registry. The couples will receive health benefits, inheritance, parenting and pension rights. The bill was passed in Parliament on 30 November 2007 after having been passed in a slightly different form in the Senate earlier in February 2007; the bill was passed by both chambers in the same form on 19 December, and signed into law by President Tabaré Vázquez on 27 December. It came into effect on 1 January 2008.

In June 2012, a judicial court in Uruguay granted recognition to a same-sex marriage licensed in Spain, creating a paradoxical situation, in which Uruguay recognizes same-sex marriages established in any country but Uruguay, and Uruguayans who marry elsewhere can petition a judge to recognize their marriage under Uruguayan law. The court also held that local laws permit same-sex marriage, even if they do not say so explicitly. The ruling was appealed, however, and rendered moot when Uruguay's same-sex marriage law went into effect.

In July 2010, lawmakers of the ruling Broad Front announced their intention to legalize same-sex marriage. In 2011, a same-sex marriage bill was introduced to Parliament. In December 2012, the bill passed the Chamber of Representatives by a vote of 81–6, and passed the Senate on 2 April 2013 by a 23–8 vote. Due to the Senate changing some aspects of the bill, the Chamber of Representatives re-voted on the bill on 11 April 2013, and approved it by a vote of 71 to 21, completing the legislative process to enable same-sex couples to marry in the nation. The legislatively approved law was signed by President Jose Mujica on 3 May, and went into full effect on 5 August 2013.

== Adoption and family planning ==
Since September 2009, same-sex couples in a civil union can jointly adopt. The law enabling this was approved by the Chamber of Representatives on 28 August 2009 and by the Senate on 9 September 2009. Uruguay was the first country in Latin America to allow same-sex couples to adopt children.

17 out of 23 senators voted in favour of the move. After the vote, Senator Margarita Percovich said: "It is a right for the boys and the girls, not a right for the adults. It streamlines the adoption process and does not discriminate". Diego Sempol, a representative of the gay rights group, Black Sheep, said: "This law is a significant step toward recognizing the rights of homosexual couples". Nicolas Cotugno, archbishop of Montevideo, had previously said it would be a "serious error to accept the adoption of children by homosexual couples", claiming it was "not about religion, philosophy or sociology. It's something which is mainly about the respect of human nature itself". He also claimed: "The Church cannot accept a family made up of two people of the same sex. These are people who unite and live their life together, but the Church does not consider that a family. A child is not something you make. I don't want to be too harsh in my comment, but with all due respect, a child is not a pet". Senator Francisco Gallinal of the National Party claimed: "The family is the bedrock of society and this measure weakens it. For us, allowing children to be adopted by same-sex couples is conditioning the child's free will."

Additionally, the same-sex marriage law approved in 2013 allows lesbian couples to access in vitro fertilisation.

On 3 October 2018, a family judge ruled that the Ministry of Education and Culture had discriminated when it prohibited an unmarried lesbian couple from listing both of their surnames on their twin daughters' records. The judge ruled that this was discrimination on account of sexual orientation as heterosexual couples in Uruguay are not obligated to be married in order to give their children their respective surnames. The lesbian couple, named Karina and Fernanda, met in 2015, and their twin daughters, Belen and Juliet, were born through assisted reproductive technology. Media outlets reported that, following the ruling, several other unmarried lesbian couples had applied to have their child/children carry both their surnames. Minister of Education María Julia Muñoz said that it would not appeal the court ruling.

== Discrimination protections ==
Since 2003, incitement to hatred on the grounds of sexual orientation and "sexual identity" has been prohibited. In addition, article 149ter of the Penal Code provides for enhanced penalties for crimes motivated by "sexual orientation" or "sexual identity". In 2004, an anti-discrimination law was passed to create an Honorary Commission to Combat Racial Discrimination, Xenophobia and other forms of Discrimination (Spanish: Comisión Honoraria contra el Racismo, la Xenofobia y toda otra forma de Discriminación), including sexual orientation and sexual identity discrimination. The commission is intended to investigate allegations of unlawful discriminatory conduct.

== Military service ==
Since May 2009, gay and bisexual people have been allowed to serve openly in the military of Uruguay, after the Defence Minister signed a decree stating that military recruitment policy would no longer discriminate on the basis of sexual orientation.

== Gender identity and expression ==
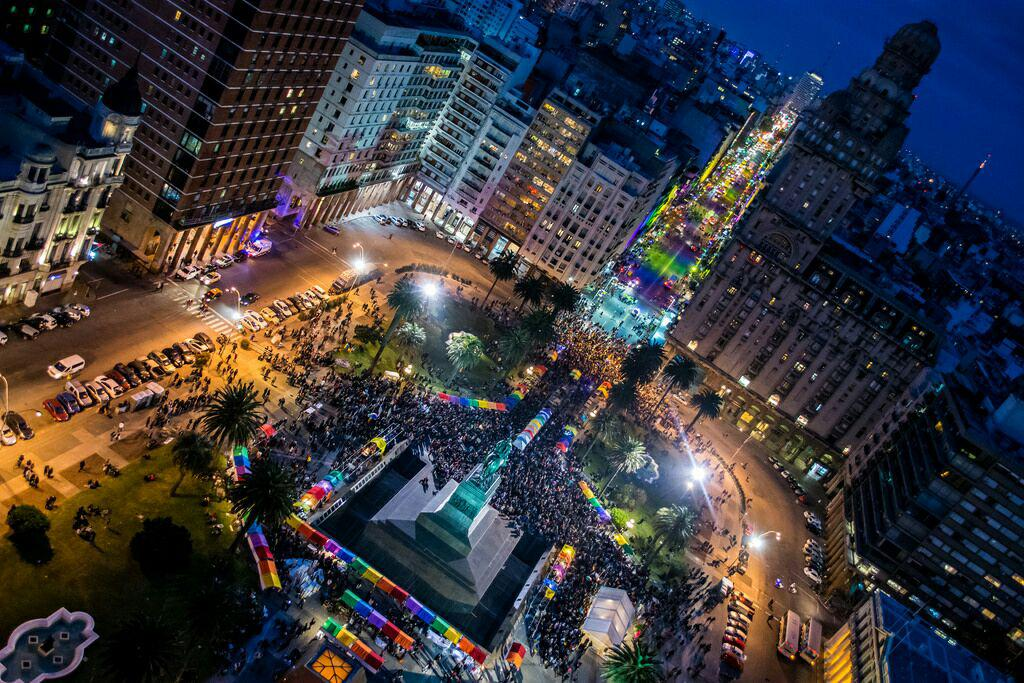
Montevideo Gay Pride Parade 2017

In October 2009, in a 51–2 vote in the Chamber of Representatives and 20–0 in the Senate, the General Assembly passed a law allowing transgender people over the age of 18 to change their name and legal gender on official documents, so that it is in line with their gender identity. Since October 2018, sex reassignment surgery, hormone therapy or any form of diagnosis are not requirements to alter one's gender on official documents.

The estimated 1,000 transgender Uruguayans have a life expectancy of around 35 to 45 years of age, when the national average is 77. They have a very high level of marginality in terms of health, education and employment. 25% had left their home before the age of 18 after being rejected by their family, 87% did not finish secondary school and suffered discrimination in the educational field and 67% became prostitutes to generate income, according to figures from the Faculty of Social Sciences at the University of the Republic. Other studies show that about 75% have been expelled from the education system, and that only 23% have access to formal employment. In addition, during the Uruguayan Dictatorship, the transgender population suffered severe torture, sexual violence and unjustified imprisonment. September 2018 reports indicated that six trans women had died since discussions of a revised transgender bill began in early 2017.

In October 2018, in a 62–26 vote in the Chamber of Representatives and 17–12 in the Senate, the General Assembly passed the Comprehensive Law for Trans Persons (Spanish: Ley Integral Para Personas Trans) that allows minors to change legal gender with parental consent. The law also established a framework to revert past discriminatory state actions, including providing monetary reparations to transgender individuals persecuted during the Uruguayan Dictatorship (estimated to be around 50 people). Furthermore, it mandates that transgender people receive 1 percent of public and private educational scholarships. The law stipulates the "free development of personality according to their chosen gender identity", and calls on the Government to ensure that transgender people are treated respectfully by authorities, included in housing programmes, have access to education, and are not denied health services. In complying with the new law, the Obras Sanitarias del Estado (the state water company) began offering jobs for transgender people in July 2019.

Between November 2018 and March 2019, about 69,360 signatures were collected for a petition to trigger a "pre-referendum" against the law. The petition was presented by National Party members Carlos Iafigliola and Álvaro Dastugue to the Electoral Court in late March 2019. The ruling Broad Front expressed "concerns" about "an onslaught of misinformation" concerning the law, arguing that the promoters of the campaign against the law had used "false" arguments and criticised a "campaign of lies". The party urged for a boycott. The Popular Unity rejected the call for the referendum. The Episcopal Conference of Uruguay of the Catholic Church published a letter from the Archbishop of Montevideo, Cardinal Daniel Sturla, in which it states that although he is against several articles of the law, because they are "based on gender ideology" and are "incompatible with Christian anthropology", he did not sign the repeal petition because the "Catholic Church has to be on the side of those who suffer and have suffered". The letter further states that the position of the religious institution is to say "No to discrimination, yes to respect." The United Nations expressed concern about the referendum initiative. The Medical Union of Uruguay (SMU) and the National Institution for Human Rights (INDDH) rejected it as well, with the latter warning of a "devastating impact" and that it would be "a setback in the recognition of fundamental rights" for transgender people. The pre-referendum on the law occurred on 4 August 2019. If 25% of the electoral roll, about 650,000 people, had voted in favor, a consultation for its repeal would have taken place. However, only about 10% of voters took part. As such, the law will remain in force and no general referendum will be held. Carlos Iafigliola, one of the initiators of the initiative, lamented that even members of his party—the National Party—did not participate.

Although Law 19,684 (article 4c) recognizes non-binary gender persons in its definitions, there is no third gender marker option available other than female and male. According to the "Non-binary people survey 2022" one of the reasons that influence non-binary people not to use the legal gender change procedure is because there is no non-binary gender option.

== Intersex rights ==
Article 22 of Law No. 19580 on violence against women based on gender (Ley N° 19580 de violencia hacia las mujeres basada en género), in force since January 2018, establishes the protocolization of interventions regarding intersex persons, prohibiting unnecessary medical procedures for children and teenagers.

== Conversion therapy ==
Adopted in 2017, the Law No. 19529 on Mental Health (Ley N° 19529 de Salud Mental) states that in no case a diagnosis can be made in the field of mental health on the exclusive basis of sexual orientation and gender identity.

== Blood donation ==
Previously, gay and bisexual men could donate blood in Uruguay, provided they hadn't had sex for 12 months.

But from 16 December 2020, the rules changed, and now they can donate blood under the same conditions as the rest of the population.

== Living conditions ==
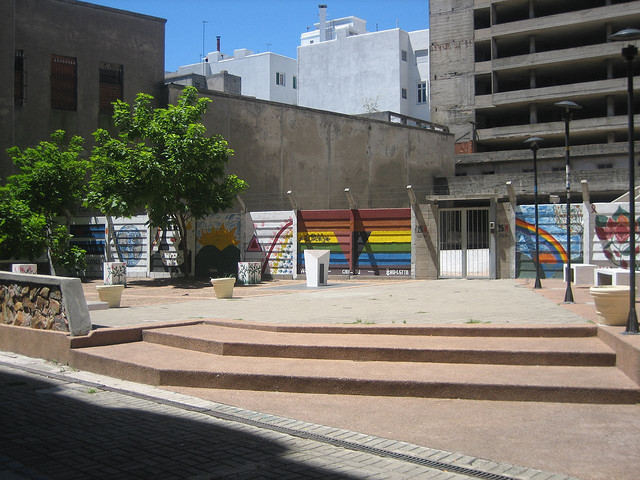
The "Sexual Diversity Monument" in Montevideo. In the centre is a triangular prism, reading: Honrar la diversidad es honrar la vida. Montevideo por el respeto a todo género de identidad y orientación sexual. Año 2005.

Uruguay is regarded as a global leader in human rights and LGBT rights, with legislation in place protecting LGBT people from discrimination and allowing same-sex couples to wed and adopt. The "Gay Happiness Index" (GHI) published based on a 2015 poll by PlanetRomeo lists Uruguay at rank five with a GHI score of 73, on par with countries such as Canada, Norway, Sweden, Denmark and Iceland. Societal acceptance of homosexuality and same-sex relationships is very high, with a 2014 poll finding that about 71% of Uruguayans supported same-sex marriage (the highest in South America and the second highest in the Americas behind Canada). Nevertheless, transgender people still face discrimination and stigma. According to the State Health Services Administration (ASSE), life expectancy for transgender people is just 45 years old. About two-thirds of transgender Uruguayans have reported being victim of physical violence.

The Montevideo Pride parade has taken place annually since the 1990s. In 2018, the event was attended by an estimated 120,000 people. It usually is celebrated on the last Friday of September, and has turned into one of Uruguay's largest public events. Other events include Punta Pride, held annually in Punta del Este in February. Montevideo is frequently referred to as one of the most gay-friendly cities in the world. There are several gay bars, restaurants and pubs in the city.

Gloria Meneses, known as "the mother of travestis" is an early and notable activist, who lived in Montevideo.

== Summary table ==
Unofficial flag of the Uruguayan LGBT community

Same-sex sexual activity legal	Yes (Since 1934)
Equal age of consent (15)	Yes (Since 1934)
Anti-discrimination laws in employment only	Yes (Since 2004)
Anti-discrimination laws in the provision of goods and services	Yes (Since 2004)
Anti-discrimination laws in all other areas (incl. indirect discrimination, hate speech)	Yes (Since 2003)
Hate crime law includes sexual orientation and sexual identity	Yes (Since 2003)
Recognition of same-sex couples	Yes (Since 2008)
Same-sex marriages	Yes (Since 2013)
Stepchild adoption by same-sex couples	Yes (Since 2009)
Joint adoption by same-sex couples	Yes (Since 2009)
LGBT people allowed to serve openly in the military	Yes (Since 2009)
Right to change legal gender	Yes (Since 2009)
Intersex minors protected from invasive surgical procedures	Yes (Since 2018)
Third gender option	No
Access to IVF for lesbians	Yes (Since 2013)
Automatic parenthood for both spouses after birth	Yes (Since 2013)
Conversion therapy banned on minors	Yes (Since 2017)
Commercial surrogacy for gay male couples	No (Banned regardless of sexual orientation)
MSMs allowed to donate blood	Yes (Since 2020)

== See also ==
- Human rights in Uruguay
- Karina Pankievich, Uruguayan trans activist
- LGBTQ history in Uruguay
- LGBTQ rights in the Americas
- Same-sex marriage in Uruguay
