= Gloria Álvez Mariño =

Uruguayan trans rights activist (1943–2021)

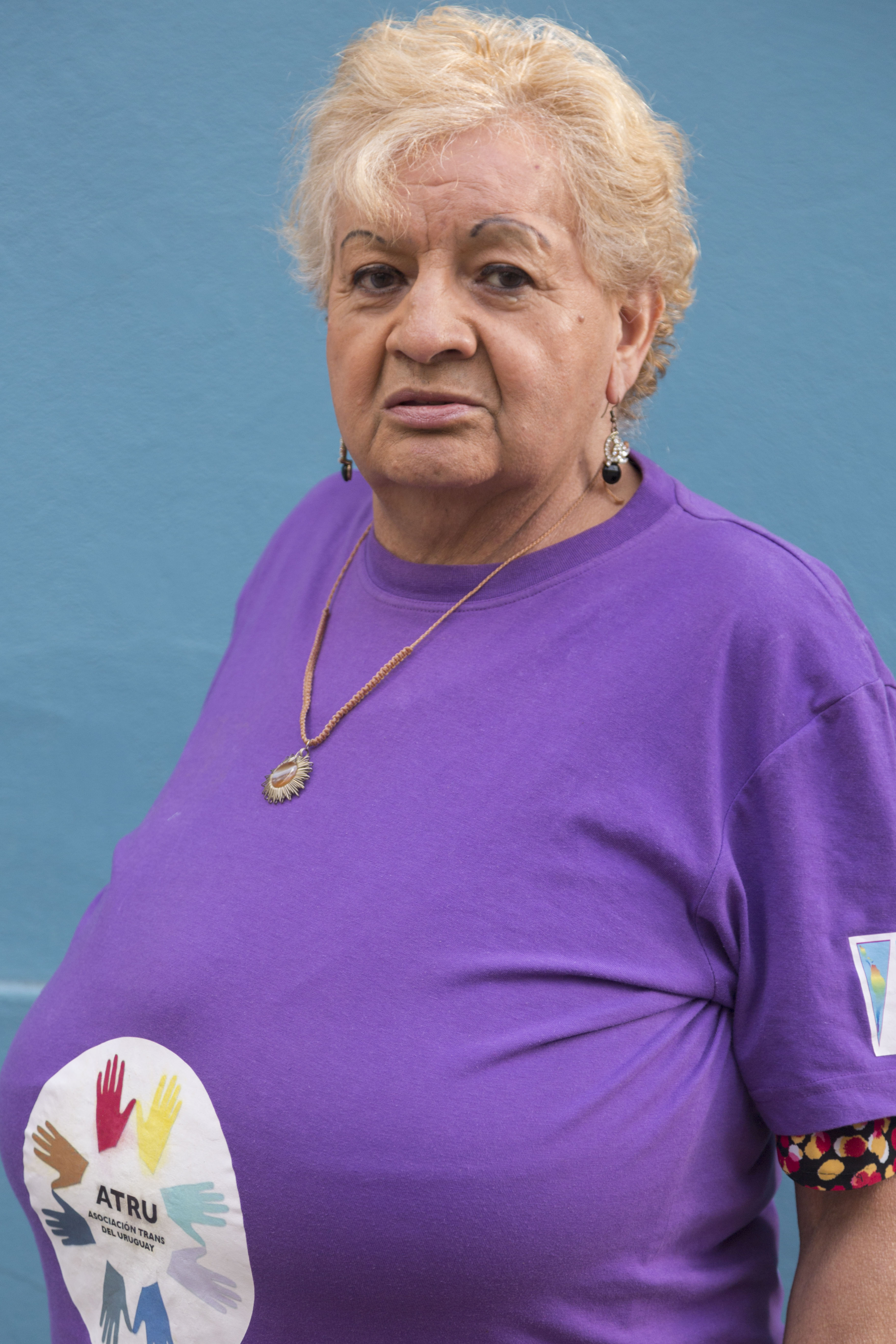
- Born: 15 September 1943; Salto, Uruguay
- Died: 30 May 2021 (aged 77); Montevideo, Uruguay
- Occupation: Activist
- Known for: Trans rights activism

Gloria Álvez Mariño (15 September 1943 – 30 May 2021) was a Uruguayan trans rights activist. She was a founder of the Travesti Organizing Table (MCT) (Spanish: Mesa Coordinadora de Travestis), which later became Trans Association of Uruguay (ATRU) (Spanish: Asociación Trans del Uruguay). Mariño was also the president and secretary of ATRU.

== Biography ==
=== Early life and oppression ===
Mariño was born in Salto, Uruguay on 15 September 1943. In 1954, she was treated as a guinea pig for doctors attempting conversion therapy and was given electric shocks. Due to this violence, she left Salto and moved to Montevideo at age 17, where she eventually joined the sex industry.

During the dictatorship of the nation and into the post-dictatorship era, military personnel and police confined and tortured Mariño and other trans women. These state actors referred to trans women, such as Mariño, as "passive pedophiles". During the dictatorship, police targeted trans women sex workers and arrested, kept in dungeons, beat, and used cattle prods on them.

=== Activism ===
She was well known for her militancy in her demands for the rights of LGBT people. Much of her effort was dealing with the HIV/AIDS crisis, both in her home country and abroad. For example, she distributed condoms to people, particularly trans women sex workers. She also participated in forums and presented reports on social and institutional violence against trans people, and against the sexual exploitation of children and adolescents.

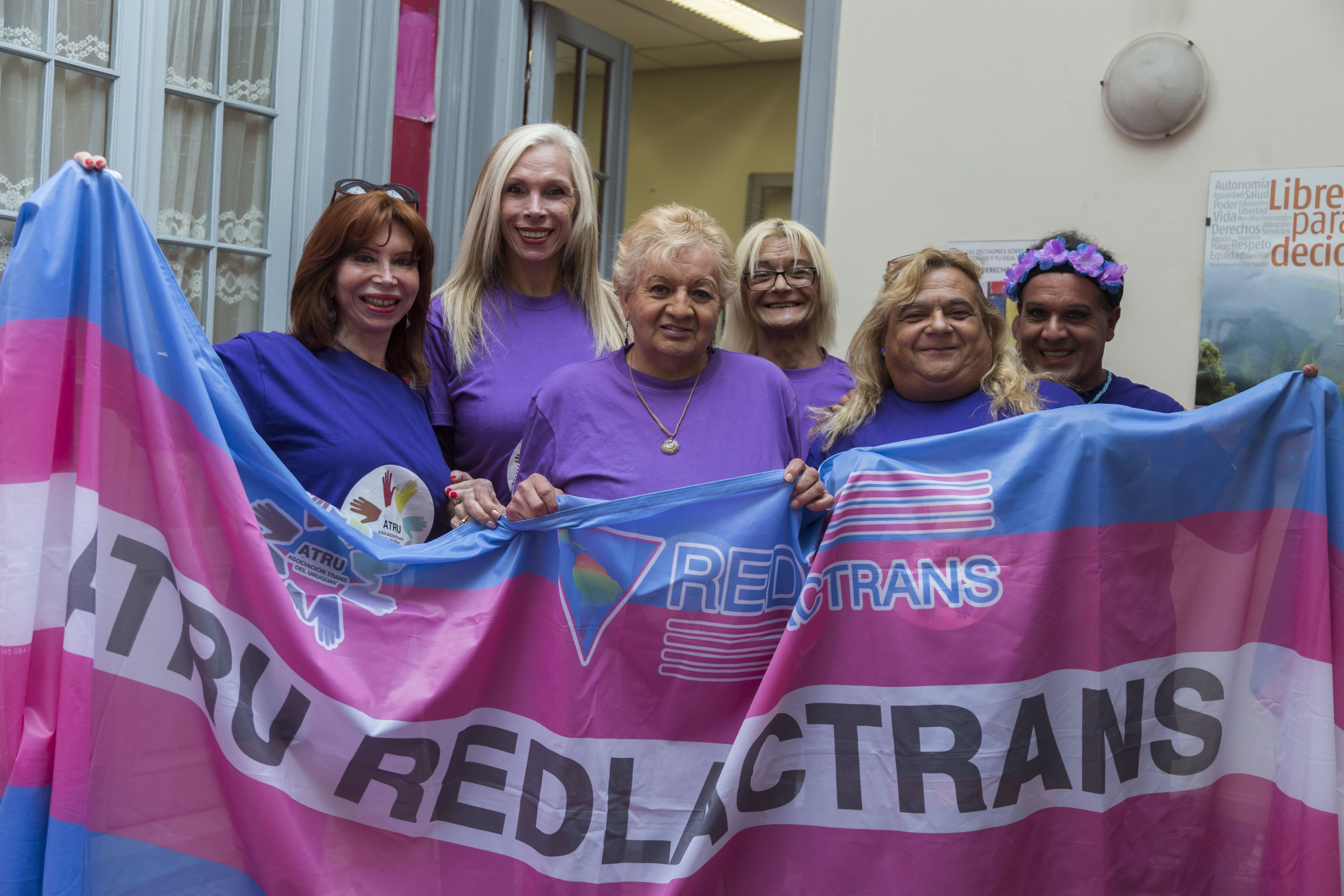
Gloria Álvez Mariño with other activists in ATRU and RedLacTrans holding a Transgender flag. She is the third from left.

In 1991, she founded the first trans collective in Uruguay: the Travesti Organizing Table (MCT) (now the ATRU). The organization has at least 500 trans women involved along with may gay men and allies.

Within the framework of the 1999-2002 economic crisis of Uruguay, she built a space for collective learning and debate around LGBT issues and become an interlocutor with the Uruguayan government. In 2002, the National Commission for the Protection of Sex Work was established. In this space, Mariño was able to denounce abuses and institutional violence against trans people, especially those in the sex industry.

Later in life, she worked as a Uruguayan coordinator, along with Karina Pankievich, for the Latin American and Caribbean Network of Trans People (RedLacTrans).

In her 30 years of militant activism under the umbrella of trans rights, she helped elaborate bills that recognize and protect trans women and sex workers, including the Sex Work Law (Law No. 17.515), Law for the Regulation of the Right to Gender Identity (Law No. 18.620) and the Comprehensive Law for Trans Persons (Law No. 19.684).

== Religion ==
Mariño belonged to the Afro-Brazilian religion Umbanda. She was devoted to the deity Oshun, who represents beauty, love, and femininity. Since Oshun is associated with the number eight, this was Mariño's lucky number.

== Death ==
Mariño was told she would receive the COVID-19 vaccine, and was excited by this. However, it did not come before she caught and died from the illness.

== Recognition ==
Mariño was recognized in Uruguay and the world more broadly for her activism. Her photos are part of the collective memoriabilia of trans people as a part of Archivo Sociedades en Movimiento (ASM). The chant of the 2021 March for Diversity by Cotidiano Mujer remembers Mariño, stating:

Hoy en particular, marchamos y recordamos a Gloria Alvez Mariño, compañera entrañable de ATRU fallecida este año. Referente nacional e internacional de la lucha por la diversidad sexual y por los derechos de las personas trans. Hasta siempre Gloria!!! Today in particular, we march and remember Gloria Alvez Mariño, a dear companion of ATRU who died this year. She is a national and international reference in the fight for sexual diversity and for the rights of trans people. Godspeed Gloria!!!

Collette Spinetti, the director of the Trans Collective of Uruguay, wrote that "Perder la memoria de Gloria sería perder la historia del movimiento trans" (English: "To lose the memory of Gloria would be to lose the history of the trans movement"). She was honored by Ana Olivera to Uruguayan representatives.
