= Same-sex marriage in Mexico =

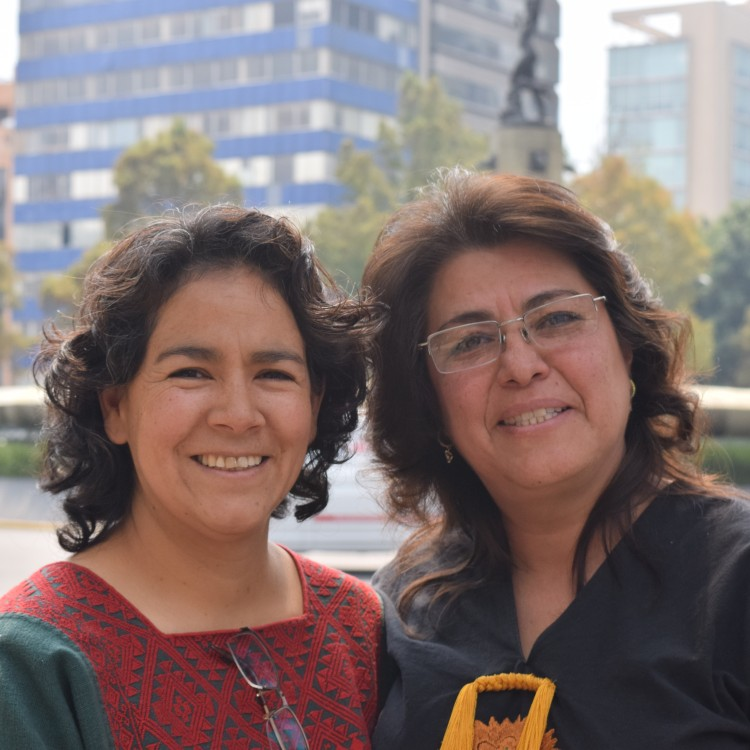
Lol Kin Castañeda and Judith Vázquez (r), the first same-sex couple married in Mexico City and Mexico (2010).

Same-sex marriage is legally recognized and performed throughout Mexico since 2022. On 11 August 2010 the Supreme Court of Justice of the Nation ruled that same-sex marriages performed anywhere within Mexico must be recognized by the 31 states without exception, and fundamental spousal rights except for adoption (such as alimony payments, inheritance rights, and the coverage of spouses by the federal social security system) have also applied to same-sex couples across the country. Mexico was the fifth country in North America (Note: After Canada, the United States, Costa Rica, and Cuba) and the 33rd worldwide to allow same-sex couples to marry nationwide.

Only civil marriages are recognized by Mexican law, and all proceedings fall under state legislation. On 12 June 2015, the Supreme Court of Justice of the Nation ruled that state bans on same-sex marriage violate the federal constitution. The court's ruling is considered a "jurisprudential thesis" and did not invalidate any state laws, but required judges and courts throughout Mexico to approve all applications for same-sex marriages, and any marriage law that was changed and did not recognize same-sex marriage would be declared unconstitutional and invalidated.

By October 2022, Mexico City and all Mexican states had legalized same-sex marriage, either by legislation, executive action, or Supreme Court order. However, marital rights are not necessarily equal when it comes to adoption: only 22 of the 31 states, plus Mexico City, have civil codes that allow same-sex couples to adopt, though in other states same-sex couples can adopt through the court system under jurisprudence established by the Supreme Court. In 2 of the 31 states, marriage licenses are issued to same-sex couples despite not being allowed under state law; they may take more time to process or be more expensive than licenses for opposite-sex couples, and there is a possibility that future administrations might stop issuing licensees.

Same-sex civil unions (Spanish: sociedad de convivencia, pronounced [sosjeˈðað ðe kombiˈβensja]) (Note: Defined by law in Campeche as sociedad civil de convivencia, in Coahuila as pacto civil de solidaridad, in Colima as enlace conyugal, in Jalisco as libre convivencia, and in Tlaxcala as sociedad de convivencia solidaria.) are legally performed in Mexico City and in the states of Campeche, Coahuila, Michoacán, Tlaxcala and Veracruz. From 2013 to 2016, they were also performed in the state of Colima, but were replaced by same-sex marriage legislation. They were also performed in Jalisco beginning in 2014, but the law was struck down on procedural grounds in 2018.

== History ==
On 9 November 2006, after several years of consideration, the Legislative Assembly of Mexico City approved a civil union law called Ley de Sociedades de Convivencia. It was the first such law in Mexico, soon followed by the northern state of Coahuila in January 2007.

In late November 2009, the leading party in the Legislative Assembly of Mexico City, the Party of the Democratic Revolution (PRD), announced that it was introducing an amendment to the Civil Code to legalize same-sex marriage in Mexico City, a project endorsed by the local Head of Government, Marcelo Ebrard, but strongly opposed by the second-largest political force in the country, the right-of-center National Action Party (PAN) and the Roman Catholic Church. The bill found support from over 600 non-governmental organizations, including the International Lesbian, Gay, Bisexual, Trans and Intersex Association (ILGA) and Amnesty International. On 21 December 2009, Mexico City became the first Latin American jurisdiction to legalize same-sex marriage. The law became effective on 4 March 2010. On 5 August 2010, the Supreme Court voted 8–2 to uphold the constitutionality of Mexico City's same-sex marriage law. The Court later ruled on 10 August 2010 that Mexico City marriages are valid throughout the entire country.

On 28 November 2011, the first two same-sex marriages occurred in Quintana Roo after discovering that the state's Civil Code did not explicitly prohibit same-sex marriage, but these marriages were later annulled by the Governor of Quintana Roo in April 2012. In May 2012, the Secretary of State of Quintana Roo reversed the annulments and allowed for future same-sex marriages to be performed in the state.

A 2012 Oaxaca case was pivotal in opening the door to legal same-sex marriage in every state in Mexico, through the recurso de amparo process. Using international decisions, whose verdicts serve as legal precedent in Mexican courts, such as the protections in the Atala Riffo and Daughters v. Chile case, the U.S. cases Loving v. Virginia and Brown v. Board of Education and Mexico's own anti-discrimination laws, the Supreme Court ruled on 5 December 2012 that: 1) Laws limiting marriage to one man and one woman, or for the purposes of perpetuating the species, violate federal law requiring that they "correspond to all persons without any distinction" and 2) That such laws are unconstitutional on the basis of discrimination by sexual orientation and usurpation of the right, not only of the individual but also the couple's right, to form a family. The ruling did not directly overturn the impugned laws, but established that marriages obtained by injunction (amparo) can be performed in any state, regardless of whether the state Civil Code has been changed.

A landmark decision, issued on 29 January 2014, was the first injunction for marriage recognition in Puebla. The case involved a same-sex couple who legally married in Mexico City in 2012 and filed for spousal benefits with the Mexican Social Security Institute (IMSS) in the state of Puebla, but were denied. Because the complainant died during the injunction process, a lower court had dismissed the case, but the Supreme Court granted the injunction and ordered recognition of the marriage by both the state of Puebla and the IMSS. The injunction required IMSS to extend benefits it offered to married heterosexual couples to same-sex couples anywhere in Mexico who are married or in civil unions.

The Supreme Court's Tesis jurisprudencial 1a./J. 43/2015 (10a.) stated that state bans on same-sex marriage violate Articles 1 and 4 of the Constitution of Mexico

A ruling by the Supreme Court on 12 June 2015 stated that state bans on same-sex marriage violate Articles 1 and 4 of the Constitution of Mexico. The court's ruling is considered a "jurisprudential thesis" and did not invalidate any state laws, meaning same-sex couples denied the right to wed would still have to seek individual injunctions in court. The ruling standardized the procedures for judges and courts throughout Mexico to approve all applications for same-sex marriages, and made the approval mandatory. The ruling was published in the country's Judicial Gazette on 19 June 2015 and became binding on 22 June 2015. Some have suggested the ruling "effectively legalizes" same-sex marriage in Mexico, though without legislative change, civil registrars are still bound to follow state laws. Indeed, the Supreme Court does not have the legal power to strike down all the states' same-sex marriage bans. It can only do so one at a time and under specific circumstances.

The ruling states:

"Marriage. The law of any federative entity that, on the one hand, considers that the purpose of it [marriage] is procreation and/or that defines it as that which is celebrated between a man and a woman, is unconstitutional." (Matrimonio. La ley de cualquier entidad federativa que, por un lado, considere que la finalidad de aquél es la procreación y/o que lo defina como el que se celebra entre un hombre y una mujer, es inconstitucional.)

On 20 December 2015, the National Human Rights Commission submitted a general recommendation to all state executive and legislative bodies, requesting them to allow same-sex marriages in their jurisdictions. The Commission considers differentiated marriage constructions for same-sex couples (such as civil unions) to be discriminatory.

On 17 May 2016, President Enrique Peña Nieto announced he had signed an initiative to amend Article 4 of the Constitution to legalize same-sex marriage nationwide. Any amendment to the Constitution requires support of at least a two-thirds majority in Congress and ratification by a simple majority of the 31 states. He also submitted a bill to make appropriate changes in the Civil Code. Chairman of the Committee on Constitutional Issues of the Chamber of Deputies, Daniel Ordóñez Hernández, announced in June 2016 that the President's initiative would be debated by the committee later in the year. Ordoñez also said that 47,000 letters expressing opposition to the initiative were received though none of them were signed. On 9 November 2016, the committee rejected the initiative by 19 votes to 8.

On 30 November 2016, the Supreme Court unanimously declared that six articles of the Law of the Institute of Social Security and Social Services of State Workers (ISSSTE; Ley del Instituto de Seguridad y Servicios Sociales de los Trabajadores del Estado) were unconstitutional because they discriminated against same-sex couples. The Court found that the wording of articles 6, 39, 40, 131 and 135, and sections I and II of the ISSSTE Act violated the rights of same-sex couples to affiliate as beneficiaries of the institute, and thus, those articles violate the principle of equality and non-discrimination established in Articles 1 and 123 of the Constitution. A further ruling issued by the Supreme Court holding that same-sex couples in Mexico have a nationwide right to establish and maintain a family life, whether through procreation, adoption or other means derived from scientific advances, took effect on 30 January 2017.

The 2018 general elections resulted in the National Regeneration Movement (MORENA), a left-wing party that supports same-sex marriage, winning the majority or plurality of legislative seats in 13 states where same-sex marriage was not legal at the time. MORENA along with the Labor Party also won an absolute majority in the Chamber of Deputies and the Senate. In October 2018, shortly after the beginning of the new legislative term, PRD Senator Juan Zepeda Hernández introduced a draft proposal to legalize same-sex marriage nationwide in Mexico. On 18 December 2019, the ruling party introduced a constitutional amendment to legalize same-sex marriage at the federal level, upgrade civil unions to marriage, and require all states to adjust their laws correspondingly within three months of passage.

In September 2018, MORENA Senator Germán Martínez introduced a draft proposal to codify certain court rulings pertaining to the legal rights of same-sex couples into law, namely social security benefits and the right to a widow or widower's pension. On 6 November 2018, the Senate unanimously (110–0) approved the bill, and it unanimously (415–0) passed the Chamber of Deputies later that month. The bill was gazetted on 29 November 2018.

On 19 October 2018, a federal court ruled that Mexico must recognize same-sex marriages performed in Mexican consulates and embassies abroad as long as one partner is a Mexican citizen. The plaintiffs in the case, activist Daniel Berezowsky Ramirez and Jaime Chavez Alor, married at the Mexican consulate in New York City on 26 November. In late November, Senator Ricardo Monreal introduced a bill to Congress to allow same-sex marriages in Mexican consulates without the need for couples to obtain a court injunction. On 16 May 2019, the Secretary of Foreign Affairs issued a decree authorizing same-sex marriages at Mexican consulates.

=== Constitutional wording ===
The Constitution of Mexico does not explicitly define nor ban same-sex marriage. The Constitution does contain various articles protecting the "integrity of the family" and the "fraternity and equality of rights of all" and forbidding "any form of discrimination, based on [...] sexual orientation, marital status, [...] which violates the human dignity or seeks to annul or diminish the rights and freedoms of the people". For these reasons, the Supreme Court has ruled that banning same-sex marriage is unconstitutional.

Article 4 provides that men and women have an equal right to marry, and states that "the law shall protect the organization and development of the family." (Note: In Spanish: Esta protegerá la organización y el desarrollo de la familia. In Nahuatl: Inin kin manauis nejchikolis uan iueixka iuikaluan. In Yucatec Maya: Le je'ela' yaan u kanáantik u nu'ukbesajil yéetel u jóok'ol táanil le láak'tsililo'. In Tzeltal: Ja' inito yame skolta te mach'a stsobo sbaik sok ta sp'oleselbel te alnich'ane. In Tzotzil: Ja' ta sk'elbe k'u sba smelolal stsob sbaik xchi'uk slekubtasel smuk'ubtasel uts' alal. In Mixtec: Ndihi ñivi iyo cha cuiti cha cua cachi ñi cha cua savaha cha vaha chi ñi chi iqui cuñu ñi, ta cha vaha iyo chi cha cua cuu chi. In Zapotec: Ne laaca laani nga gusiroobani, ne gutagulisaani xquenda biaani binni ti guibani ca jneza. In Otomi: Nuna mädi ra mutsi ne ra te nuya mengu. In Totonac: Ja'é namakgtakgalha ixtalakaxlan xawa ixlitatlanit litalakgapasni. In Chʼol: Iliyi mi ikäntyañ bajche' mi ichumtyäl lakpi'älob cha'añ mi ip'äty-esañ wembä ichumtyäl tyi lakmajchil. In Mazatec: Jè kjoatéxoma siikonda ní nga mi ki mé katama la koni 'sín nga siíxájtín ko nga ma katamiìjin ra jngo ni'ya xita. In Huastec: Ax neets kin k'aniy in yanel jant'in ti neets ti puwel in yanel. In Mazahua: Nu tjurꞹ nu nge k'o ra pjorꞹ ja ra mimiji, ja ra b'ꞹntjoji ñe ja ra nok'ꞹ texe in dyojui. In Tlapanec: Xú mambàyú xú makuwíin gajmaá xú magajiin xàbù. In Purépecha: I kwách'akwati tánkurhikwani ka kw'íripikwa sïrukwichiri. In Mixe: A ëda ley je'e nëwa'an guwa'anaamp jadu'un ja tu' jëën tu' tëjkpë ajxy oy jyak'yeegët. In Tarahumara: 'Échi kó'á tibúma, natuíka nocháa´mi kíti kó a'lá kánílika retemáka perélima.)

=== México Igualitario Project ===
The activist group México Igualitario is pursuing a legal strategy to win same-sex marriage state-by-state through court action. When a court in Mexico rules that an existing law is unconstitutional in five separate and consecutive amparos, using identical language in each ruling, this creates jurisprudence against that law and bounds the state legislatures to change the law. This process is called recurso de amparo. When a same-sex couple is denied the right to marry, they can file an amparo with a court to request that they be allowed to legally marry. Since 2015, the courts have been obliged to rule in favor of same-sex couples seeking marriage certificates. An amparo may be invoked when a person feels their rights have been violated. The process is not expensive, but is "time-consuming". The English word "injunction" can be used to refer to amparos. Despite the legal requirement for the states to legalize same-sex marriage after 5 amparo rulings, this has often not been followed through. In Chihuahua, prior to the legalization of same-sex marriage there in 2015, almost 20 injunctions were carried out. Same-sex marriages by amparo have occurred in every state.

=== Actions of unconstitutionality ===
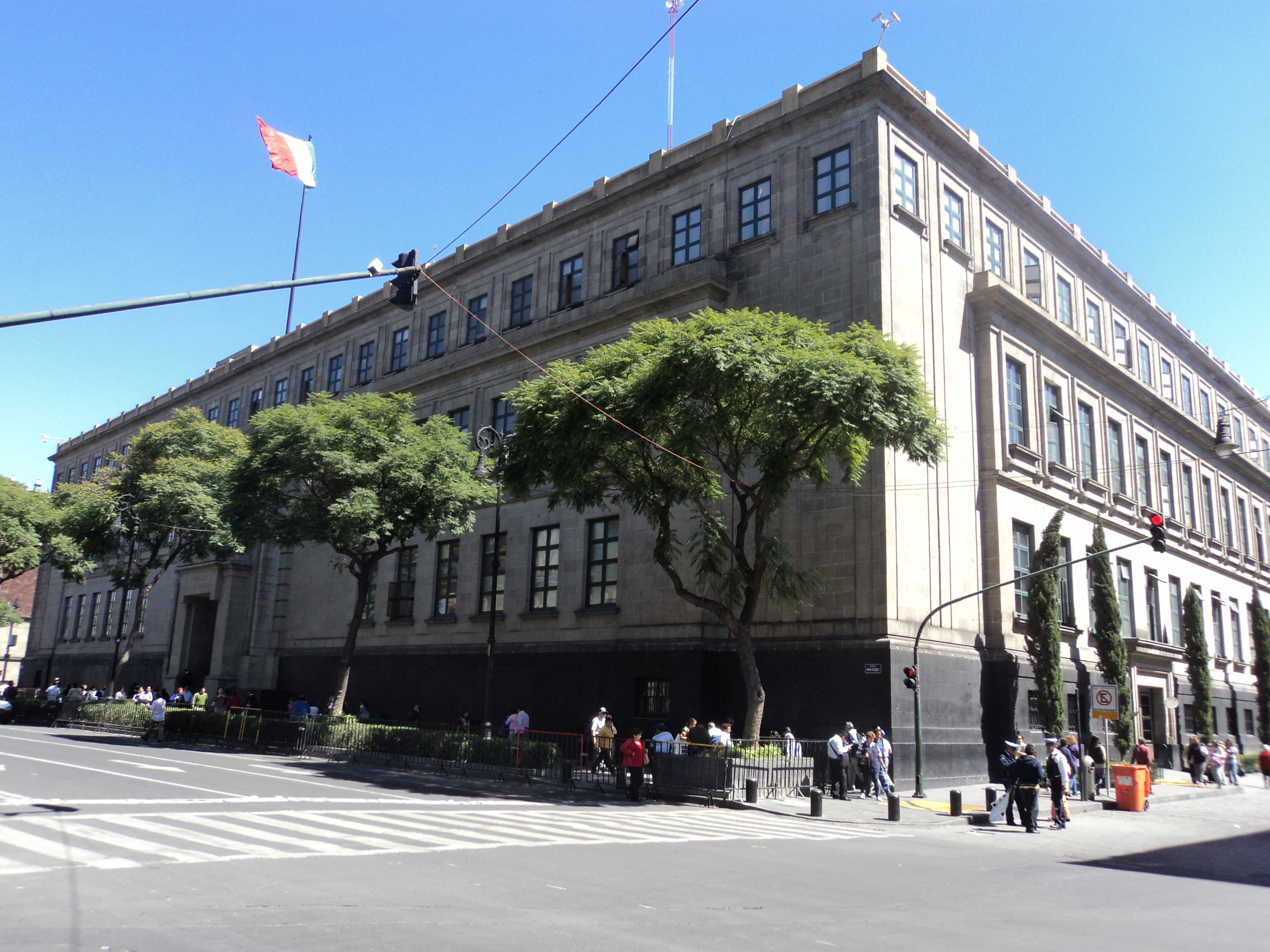
The Supreme Court (Spanish: Suprema Corte de Justicia de la Nación) directly reviews actions of unconstitutionality.

An "action of unconstitutionality" (Spanish: acción de inconstitucionalidad) is a lawsuit seeking to determine if a certain law is unconstitutional. In Mexico, they can only be filed within 30 days after the law has come into force. As many state marriage laws in Mexico are decades-old, LGBT groups cannot file an action of unconstitutionality against these laws. However, if these laws are modified by the state legislatures, then this qualifies for an action of unconstitutionality. For instance, in 2016, the Congress of Puebla modified its marriage laws, but left intact provisions outlawing same-sex marriages. LGBT groups quickly filed an action of unconstitutionality. Actions of unconstitutionality are reviewed by the full bench of the Supreme Court. The Court decides whether these laws are constitutional, and if they are not, they are struck down and thereafter null and void. As of June 2022, six states (Aguascalientes, Chiapas, Jalisco, Nuevo León, Puebla, and Veracruz) have had their same-sex marriage bans struck down in this way.

=== 2018 Inter-American Court of Human Rights advisory opinion ===
On 9 January 2018, the Inter-American Court of Human Rights issued an advisory opinion that states party to the American Convention on Human Rights should grant same-sex couples accession to all existing domestic legal systems of family registration, including marriage, along with all rights that derive from marriage. LGBT advocacy groups in Mexico urged the government to abide by the advisory opinion, and fully legalize same-sex marriage.

== By state ==
How same-sex marriage was legalized in each state
Federal entity	Date of enactment/ruling	Date effective	Date of codification (if different)	Adoption rights	Legalization method	Details
Aguascalientes	2 April 2019	16 August 2019 (Note: Rulings of the Supreme Court officially take effect on the day they are published in the Official Journal (Diario Oficial de la Federación). Despite this, in several of the relevant states, the state Civil Registry and many local municipalities chose to issue marriage certificates to same-sex couples prior to this date. In Chiapas, the first same-sex marriage occurred on 30 October 2017, and in Nuevo León on 11 March 2019, for instance.)	TBD	Yes	Judicial decree	Ruling of the Supreme Court
Baja California	3 November 2017	3 November 2017	16 June 2021	Yes	Governmental decree, legislative statute and constitutional amendment	Governmental decree. Later codified by the Congress of Baja California and ratified by a majority of the state's municipalities
Baja California Sur	27 June 2019	29 June 2019		No (Law passed November 2022, vetoed March 2024)	Legislative statute	Passed by the Congress of Baja California Sur
Campeche	10 May 2016	20 May 2016		Yes	Legislative statute	Passed by the Congress of Campeche
Chiapas	11 July 2017	11 May 2018	26 December 2024	Yes	Judicial decree and legislative statute	Ruling of the Supreme Court later codified by the state congress
(Chihuahua (state)) Chihuahua	11 June 2015	12 June 2015	TBD	Yes	Gubernatorial decree.	Continued by new governor in 2021.
Coahuila	1 September 2014	17 September 2014		Yes	Legislative statute	Passed by the Congress of Coahuila
Colima	25 May 2016	12 June 2016		Yes	Legislative statute	Passed by the Congress of Colima
Durango	16 September 2022	19 September 2022	10 October 2022	Yes	Gubernatorial decree and legislative statute	Issued by the Governor of Durango. Later codified by the Congress of Durango
Guanajuato	20 December 2021	20 December 2021	4 December 2025	Yes	Governmental decree and gubernatorial decree and legislative statute	Directive issued by the state's Secretary General of Government, followed by Governor's decree. The directive expired on 26 September 2024, but marriages continued. Later codified by the Congress of Guanajuato.
Guerrero	25 October 2022	31 December 2022		No	Legislative statute	Passed by the Congress of Guerrero, previously performed only in some municipalities
(Hidalgo (state)) Hidalgo	24 May 2019	11 June 2019		Yes	Legislative statute	Passed by the Congress of Hidalgo
Jalisco	26 January 2016	21 April 2016	9 April 2022	Yes	Judicial decree and legislative statute	Ruling of the Supreme Court. Later codified by the Congress of Jalisco
(State of Mexico) Mexico	11 October 2022	2 November 2022		No Law has not been updated, but adoptions are allowed.	Legislative statute	Passed by the Congress of the State of Mexico
Mexico City	29 December 2009	4 March 2010		Yes	Legislative statute and constitutional amendment	Passed by the Legislative Assembly of Mexico City
Michoacán	18 May 2016	23 June 2016		Yes	Legislative statute	Passed by the Congress of Michoacán
Morelos	18 May 2016	5 July 2016		Yes	Legislative statute and constitutional amendment	Passed by the Congress of Morelos and ratified by a majority of the state's municipalities
Nayarit	17 December 2015	23 December 2015		Yes (Since 2022)	Legislative statute	Passed by the Congress of Nayarit
Nuevo León	19 February 2019	31 May 2019	14 June 2023	Yes	Judicial decree and legislative statute	Ruling of the Supreme Court. Later codified by the Congress of Nuevo León
Oaxaca	26 August 2018	26 August 2018	5 October 2019	No	Administrative decision and legislative statute	Order of the State Director of the Civil Registry. Later codified by the Congress of Oaxaca
Puebla	1 August 2017	16 February 2018	11 November 2020	Yes	Judicial decree and legislative statute	Ruling of the Supreme Court. Later codified by the Congress of Puebla
Querétaro	22 September 2021	12 November 2021		Yes	Legislative statute	Passed by the Congress of Querétaro
Quintana Roo	3 May 2012	3 May 2012		Yes	Administrative decision	Decision by the state's Secretary of State
San Luis Potosí	17 May 2019	21 May 2019		Yes	Legislative statute	Passed by the Congress of San Luis Potosí
Sinaloa	15 June 2021	30 June 2021		No	Legislative statute	Passed by the Congress of Sinaloa as ordered by a federal court
Sonora	23 September 2021	22 October 2021		No Law has not been updated, but adoptions are allowed.	Legislative statute	Passed by the Congress of Sonora
Tabasco	19 October 2022	27 October 2022		Yes (Since April 2024)	Legislative statute	Passed by the Congress of Tabasco
Tamaulipas	26 October 2022	19 November 2022		Yes	Legislative statute	Passed by the Congress of Tamaulipas
Tlaxcala	8 December 2020	24 December 2020		No Law has not been updated, but adoptions are allowed.	Legislative statute	Passed by the Congress of Tlaxcala
Veracruz	30 May 2022	13 June 2022		Yes	Judicial decree and legislative statute	Ruling of the Supreme Court. Later codified by the Congress of Veracruz.
Yucatán	1 March 2022	4 March 2022		Yes The Law on Adoption is written in a gender-neutral fashion.	Constitutional amendment and legislative statute	Passed by the Congress of Yucatán
Zacatecas	14 December 2021	30 December 2021		No Law has not been updated, but adoptions are allowed.	Legislative statute	Passed by the Congress of Zacatecas

=== Mexico City ===
Civil unions

States performing civil unions in Mexico Gender-neutral civil unions. Former civil unions for same-sex couples, replaced by marriage. Civil unions never performed.

Being the seat of the Powers of the Union, Mexico City did not belong to any particular state but to all. After years of demanding greater political autonomy, residents were given the right to directly elect the Head of Government of Mexico City and the representatives of the unicameral Legislative Assembly by popular vote in 1997. For the following two decades, the center-left Party of the Democratic Revolution (PRD) controlled both political powers.

In the early 2000s, Enoé Uranga, an openly lesbian politician and activist, unsuccessfully pushed a bill that would have legalized same-sex civil unions in Mexico City under the name Ley de Sociedades de Convivencia (LSC). Despite being passed four times by legislative commissions, the bill repeatedly got stuck in plenary voting for its sensitive nature, which could be attributed to the widespread opposition from right-wing groups and then Head of Government Andrés Manuel López Obrador's ambiguity concerning the bill. Nonetheless, since new left-wing Head of Government Marcelo Ebrard was expected to take power in December 2006, the Assembly decided to take up the bill and approved it in a 43–17 vote on 9 November.

The law was well received by feminist and LGBT groups, including Emilio Álvarez Icaza, then-chairman of Mexico City's Human Rights Commission, who declared that "the law was not a threat to anyone in particular and that it will be a matter of time before it shows positive consequences for different social groups." It was strongly opposed by conservative groups such as the National Parents' Union and the Roman Catholic Church, which labeled the assemblymen who voted for the law as "sinners" and complained it was "vengeance against the Catholic Church from the more radical groups from the left, who felt it was a demand for justice". The law officially took effect on 16 March 2007. Mexico City's first same-sex civil union was between Jorge Cerpa, a 31-year-old economist, and Antonio Medina, a 38-year-old journalist. By December 2009, 736 same-sex civil unions had taken place in the city, of which 24 had been annulled (3%).

In early September 2014, modifications to the civil union agreement were drafted to eliminate discrimination on the basis of sexual orientation and dissolution support. In essence, the law had provided that upon termination, domestic partners were only allowed support for a period equal to half the length of the partnership. The Supreme Court ruled that the provision was discriminatory as it accorded differential treatment in cases of partnership for cohabitation, marriage or concubinage.

Year	Unions	Annulled
2007	257	10
2008	268	14
2009	211	14
Total	736	24

Marriage

On 24 November 2009, PRD Assemblyman David Razú proposed a bill to legalize same-sex marriage in Mexico City. Luis González Plascencia, chairman of the Human Rights Commission of Mexico City, backed the bill and said that it was up to the Legislative Assembly to consider LGBT adoption. The International Lesbian, Gay, Bisexual, Trans and Intersex Association (ILGA), Amnesty International, the AIDS Healthcare Foundation and over 600 non-governmental organizations supported the legalization of same-sex marriage in Mexico City. The conservative National Action Party (PAN) announced it would either go to the courts to appeal the law or demand a referendum. However, a referendum on same-sex marriage was rejected by the Legislative Assembly in a 36–22 vote on 18 December 2009. On 21 December 2009, the Legislative Assembly legalized same-sex marriage (39–20) in Mexico City. The bill changed the definition of marriage in the city's Civil Code from "a free union between a man and a woman" to "a free union between two people." The law grants same-sex couples the same rights as opposite-sex couples, including adopting children. PAN vowed to challenge the law in the courts. On 29 December 2009, Head of Government Marcelo Ebrard signed the bill into law, which became effective on 4 March 2010. On 5 August, the Supreme Court voted 8–2 to uphold the constitutionality of Mexico City's same-sex marriage law. The Court further ruled on 10 August 2010 that Mexico City marriages are valid throughout the country.

In early January 2017, the Constituent Assembly of Mexico City voted, in its plenary session, 68–11 to fully enshrine same-sex marriage in the Mexico City Constitution.

=== Aguascalientes ===
From 2014 onwards, multiple same-sex marriage, concubinage and civil union bills were proposed in Aguascalientes, though all of them stalled in Congress due to opposition from the ruling National Action Party.

An action of unconstitutionality was filed in 2018 by the State Human Rights Commission of Aguascalientes, challenging articles 143, 144 and 313bis of the Civil Code, which limited marriage to opposite-sex couples to "perpetuate the species". On 2 April 2019, the full bench of the Supreme Court ruled unanimously that the state's same-sex marriage ban was discriminatory against same-sex couples and unconstitutional. The ruling went into effect upon publication in the Official Gazette of the Federation on 16 August 2019, though the Civil Registry had already begun issuing same-sex marriage certificates prior to this date. Nevertheless, the text of the law still refers to marriage as between a man and a woman.

=== Baja California ===
On 23 August 2010, shortly after the ruling of the Supreme Court requiring all states to recognise same-sex marriages validly performed in other states, state legislators introduced an amendment to article 7 of the Constitution of Baja California, adding the definition of marriage as being "the union of a man and a woman". On 29 September 2010, the Congress of Baja California voted 18–1 in favor of the amendment, and after approval by municipalities, it was published on 27 May 2011. On 13 November 2014, the federal Supreme Court ruled that the state's ban on same-sex marriage was unconstitutional.

A bill was introduced to the Baja California Congress on 12 February 2015 to legalize same-sex marriage in the state by changing article 7 of the state Constitution. However, the legislation was stalled for years by opponents of same-sex marriage.

On 3 November 2017, the Government of Baja California announced that it would cease to enforce its same-sex marriage ban and that the Civil Registry will begin accepting applications for marriage licenses by same-sex couples.

The Congress of Baja California passed a bill legalizing same-sex marriage by a vote of 18–4 on 16 June 2021. The bill modified the Constitution to remove the ban on same-sex marriage added back in 2011. The amendment entered into force on 17 July 2021 after three of Baja California's six municipalities ratified it and the three others were deemed to have accepted it by taking no action ahead of the 30-day time period to consider the amendment. The amendment took effect on 9 August, one day after being published in the government gazette.

=== Baja California Sur ===
A same-sex marriage bill was first proposed in Baja California Sur on 9 April 2010 by the organization La Comunidad Sudcaliforniana en Diversidad Sexual. No action was taken by the state Congress. The July 2018 elections resulted in the National Regeneration Movement and other supportive parties winning a majority of legislative seats in Congress. On 27 June 2019, the state Congress approved a bill to legalize same-sex marriage in a 14–5 vote with one abstention. It was signed by Governor Carlos Mendoza Davis the same day and published in the official journal on 28 June 2019. The law took effect the following day. The Congress of Baja California Sur passed a bill allowing same-sex couples to adopt on 16 November 2022, but it was vetoed in March 2024. In June 2023, the Baja California Sur Congress approved a citizen initiated bill that expands the recognition of concubinage to same-sex couples.

=== Campeche ===
In April 2016, Campeche Governor Alejandro Moreno Cárdenas submitted a same-sex marriage bill to the state Congress, which was approved on 10 May 2016. The law was published in the official state gazette on 16 May 2016 and came into effect on 20 May 2016. Campeche became the seventh state to allow same-sex marriage without the need for a court order.

=== Chiapas ===
On 6 April 2016, an action of unconstitutionality was filed with the Supreme Court. The Supreme Court ruled, in a 9–2 decision, on 11 July 2017 that the heterosexual definition of marriage in the Civil Code was unconstitutional, legalizing same-sex marriage in Chiapas and eliminating the need for a court injunction. The ruling came into effect upon publication in the Official Gazette of the Federation on 11 May 2018. Nonetheless, the Civil Registry began accepting marriage applications from same-sex couples from 30 October 2017, and same-sex couples have been able to marry since that date.

On 26 December 2024, a bill to codify same-sex marriage into the state Civil Code was passed by the state congress with 30 votes in favor and 2 abstentions.

=== Chihuahua ===
On 11 June 2015, Governor César Duarte Jáquez announced the state would no longer prevent same-sex marriages, making Chihuahua the fourth jurisdiction to legalize same-sex marriage. Duarte Jáquez announced that licenses would be available by 12 June 2015. On 16 June 2015, the president of the state Congress announced that it would debate the legal codification of the executive decision. Additionally, according to the state National System for Integral Family Development, same-sex couples are allowed to adopt jointly in Chihuahua.

In February 2017, the Supreme Court ruled that the state's Civil Code was unconstitutional because it has not yet been modified to reflect the legalization of same-sex marriage. The Supreme Court ordered the state Congress to change its Civil Code within 90 days. However, the Congress refused to do so. In October 2018, the 10th District Court ruled that should the Congress fail to update its laws "soon", it would hold legislators in contempt and order their dismissal from office.

=== Coahuila ===
The legalization of same-sex civil unions in Coahuila had started to be discussed as early as November 2006, simultaneously with the discussion then ongoing in Mexico City. On 11 January 2007, the state Congress legalized same-sex civil unions under the name pacto civil de solidaridad, which gave property and inheritance rights to same-sex couples. Twenty days after the law had passed, the country's first same-sex civil union took place in Saltillo. It was between 29-year-olds Karina Almaguer and Karla Lopez, a lesbian couple from Tamaulipas.

On 5 March 2013, Congressman Samuel Acevedo Flores, from the Social Democratic Party, introduced a bill to the Congress of Coahuila to legalize same-sex marriages and adoption by same-sex couples. On 11 February 2014, Congress approved the adoption bill and passed the same-sex marriage bill on 1 September 2014. It took effect on 17 September, and the first couple married on 20 September.

=== Colima ===
In July 2009, the Party of the Democratic Revolution (PRD) introduced a formal initiative to legalize civil unions in the western state of Colima. Nevertheless, the following month, the state Congress decided not to take up the initiative, following widespread opposition from right-wing groups. In December 2009, Governor Mario Anguiano Moreno agreed to discuss the legalization of civil unions and adoption by same-sex couples.

On 4 July 2013, the state Congress approved a new form of union called enlace conyugal (conjugal bond) for same-sex couples, which according to Deputy Martín Flores Castañeda grants the same rights and obligations as marriage.

A bill to legalize same-sex marriage in the state was unanimously approved by the Congress of Colima on 25 May 2016. The bill was passed 24 to 0. The existing same-sex civil union law was repealed simultaneously. The same-sex marriage law was published in the state's official gazette on 11 June 2016 and came into effect on 12 June 2016. The new law allows couples who previously contracted civil unions before the legislation was repealed to have them recognized by the state or converted to a marriage. It also allows same-sex couples to adopt children jointly.

=== Durango ===
Same-sex marriage became legal in Durango state on 19 September 2022, with a decree from the state governor.

In September 2013, PRD Deputy Israel Soto Peña introduced a bill to legalize same sex marriage in the state. On 10 April 2014, the bill was rejected on the basis that it would not sufficiently address the legal changes necessary to correct the Civil Code. In May, Soto Peña announced that he would revamp the initiative and resubmit it, which he did on 1 November 2014.

On 10 February 2016, the Justice Commission of the Congress of Durango approved a draft bill to legalize same-sex marriage in the state. However, the bill's plenary discussion was postponed for 6 months to organize discussions on the matter and to inform legislators on the subject before a vote. On 31 January 2017, Congress rejected the bill, in a 15–4 vote with 4 abstentions. The bill proposed by PAN was supported by both the PRD and PAN, but was opposed by the PRI.

The July 2018 elections resulted in MORENA, PRD and the Labor Party, pro-same-sex marriage parties, winning the majority of legislative seats in Durango.

In July 2022 a federal judge ordered the Durango Congress to consider an abandoned same-sex-marriage bill in their next session, due to the critical number of amparos having been reached. The ruling does not require a particular vote, but does require legislators to go on record as to whether they will comply with the Supreme Court ruling. On 16 September 2022, the newly elected governor Esteban Villegas Villarreal published a decree for same-sex marriage.

Five days later, on 21 September 2022, the Congress of Durango voted 15–9 to pass a bill codifying the right to same-sex marriage and non-discrimination based on sexual orientation, religion, disability, or health status by marriage officiants.

=== Guanajuato ===
Same-sex marriage became legal in Guanajuato on 20 December 2021, when government secretary Libia García Muñoz Ledo announced that the right to marry would be extended to any two people regardless of gender in strict adherence to the constitutions of Mexico and Guanajuato, precedents of the Supreme Court of Justice of the Nation, and requirements under the International Covenant on Civil and Political Rights.

In response to the first amparo approval, on 21 February 2014, the PRD introduced a bill to Congress to amend the Guanajuato Civil Code so as to allow same-sex marriages. The plan was endorsed by the PRI, but on 13 April 2015, the Justice Committee, with a majority from the state's ruling PAN party, voted 3–2 to shelve both bills citing PAN's objection to same-sex unions. On 29 April 2016, the Guanajuato City Council unanimously passed a resolution allowing a lesbian couple to marry in the municipality. Additionally, they urged Governor Miguel Márquez Márquez to change the Civil Code to allow for same-sex marriages. In October 2018, PRD Deputy Isidoro Bazaldúa Lugo introduced a same-sex marriage bill to Congress. Guanajuato was the 23rd Mexican state to approve same-sex marriage.

The Congress of Guanajuato approved a bill to codify same-sex marriage, including access to adoption, into state law on 4 December 2025.

=== Guerrero ===
The Congress of Guerrero passed a same-sex marriage bill on 25 October 2022, by 38–6. The bill also recognizes same-sex concubinage. The bill was finally published on 30 December 2022, taking effect the next day.

After the Supreme Court ruling went into effect on 22 June 2015, officials in Guerrero began announcing plans for a series of collective group weddings. Governor Rogelio Ortega submitted a same-sex marriage bill to Congress on 7 July 2015. Legislators complained that they would have preferred to have the bill passed before marriages took place, but it was not feasible in the available time-frame. On 10 July 2015, 20 same-sex couples were married by Governor Ortega in Acapulco. On 13 January 2016, the head of the Civil Registry of Acapulco stated that the 20 same-sex marriages that occurred on 10 July 2015 in Acapulco were void, as there was no law to permit same-sex marriage in the state. On 13 February 2016, a day before mass Valentine's Day weddings were planned statewide, the head of Guerrero's State Civil Registry department announced that same-sex couples could marry in any jurisdiction willing to marry the couples and criticised Acapulco's Civil Registry and other civil registries throughout the state for not allowing the weddings. The department head stated that same-sex marriages conducted in Guerrero would be legally valid. Some other Guerreran municipalities, such as Chilpancingo de los Bravo and Zihuatanejo de Azueta, began to marry same-sex couples. In August 2020, Acapulco announced that it would perform same-sex marriages.

=== Hidalgo ===
As Mexico City and Coahuila had recently legalized civil unions, a similar proposal was introduced in Hidalgo in July 2007. However, it stalled and never reached a vote. In October 2013, the state Congress indicated there was not sufficient "maturity" in the society to accept same-sex marriage and that it would instead consider a conjugal partnership bill.

The 2018 elections resulted in the National Regeneration Movement (MORENA) winning the majority of legislative seats in Congress. After the election, a same-sex marriage bill was introduced to the state Congress. The bill was approved on 14 May 2019 in a vote of 18–2 with 8 abstentions. Governor Omar Fayad signed the bill on 24 May. It was published in the official journal on 10 June 2019 and took effect the following day.

=== Jalisco ===
In April 2013, a cross-party group of deputies presented the Free Coexistence Act (Spanish: Ley de Libre Convivencia) to the state Congress. The Act established that same-sex civil unions can be performed in the state, as long as they are not considered marriages. It did not legalize adoption and mandated that civil unions be performed with a civil law notary. On 31 October 2013, the Congress of Jalisco approved the Act in a 20–15 vote, one abstained and three were absent. The law took effect on 1 January 2014. On 13 September 2018, the Supreme Court of Justice of the Nation struck down the law on procedural grounds.

The first same-sex marriage in the state occurred via injunction in December 2013. On 26 January 2016, the full bench of the Supreme Court unanimously declared the Civil Code unconstitutional for limiting marriage to heterosexual couples. The Jalisco State Civil Registry Directory changed all marriage licenses to gender-neutral on 22 March 2016 so that same-sex couples could already begin receiving them. On 21 April 2016, the Supreme Court ruling took effect after being printed in the Official Gazette of the Federation.

On 12 May 2016, the Congress of Jalisco instructed all the state's municipalities to issue marriage licenses to same-sex couples. In June 2017, a bill removing the heterosexual definition of marriage and inserting a gender-neutral definition was introduced to Congress.

On 6 April 2022, the Congress of Jalisco passed a bill codifying same-sex marriage into law, on a vote of 26–8 with 3 abstentions.

=== México ===
In 2008, an initiative for the legalization of civil unions was launched in the State of México, but never advanced. In 2010, a citizen's initiative to legalize same-sex marriage was presented to Congress. After three years, it had not been reviewed, so in mid-2013 PRD Deputy Octavio Martínez introduced a same-sex marriage bill. The state Governor submitted a new marriage bill, while PRD submitted a proposal to legalize same-sex adoption on 5 March 2015. Neither bill was brought to a vote.

On 11 October 2022, the Congress of the State of Mexico voted 49–12 with six abstentions to pass a bill legalizing same-sex marriage and concubinage. It was published on 1 November 2022, and took effect the next day.

=== Michoacán ===
On 27 August 2015, the Justice and Human Rights Committee announced it would enact a civil union law for same-sex couples. It was approved unanimously in a 34–0 vote by the Congress of Michoacán on 7 September 2015. The law was published on 30 September 2015 in the state's official journal.

On 9 February 2016, the Justice and Human Rights Committee approved a Family Code that would allow same-sex marriage and joint adoption. It was stated that the Michoacán Congress would vote on the proposal in the coming days. However, the vote was postponed until sometime in May 2016. On 18 May 2016, the state Congress eventually approved the proposal by a vote of 27 in favor, none opposed and 8 abstentions. The law was published in the state's official diary on 22 June 2016 and came into effect on 23 June. The law allows couples to adopt children jointly.

=== Morelos ===
On 18 May 2016, the Congress of Morelos voted 20 to 6 to approve a constitutional change to legalize same-sex marriage. A constitutional amendment requires the ratification of at least 17 of the 33 municipalities in the state. The 33 municipalities had until 25 June 2016 to act on the amendment. At the end of the process, a total of 17 municipalities had ratified the constitutional change and 15 had voted against ratification, while 1 municipality was awarded an extra week, although the clear majority being in favor meant that same-sex marriage would become legal in the state. The law was promulgated and published in the state's official gazette on 4 July 2016. It took effect on 5 July. The state adoption agency clarified that the law shall allow same-sex couples to adopt jointly as the process is open to all spouses in Morelos.

=== Nayarit ===
On 25 June 2015, Deputy Luis Manuel Hernández Escobedo introduced a bill allowing same-sex couples to marry and making the definition of concubinage gender-neutral. On 17 December 2015, the state Congress approved the bill in a 26–1 vote with 1 abstention. The bill was published in the official journal, following Governor Roberto Sandoval Castañeda's signature, on 22 December 2015, and took effect the following day.

=== Nuevo León ===
On 17 June 2015, the New Alliance Party announced their intention to introduce a same-sex marriage bill. An Independent congressman announced his intention to submit his own civil union proposal with the support of the ruling PAN. On 22 June 2015, New Alliance member and Congress President, María Dolores Leal Cantú, presented the same-sex marriage bill. On 16 May 2016, the president of the Legislative Commission of the state Congress announced that the bill would be voted upon sometime in September, but this did not happen.

An action of unconstitutionality against Nuevo León's same-sex marriage ban was filed in February 2018. On 19 February 2019, the Supreme Court declared articles 140 and 148 of the state Civil Code unconstitutional, fully legalizing same-sex marriage in Nuevo León. The ruling came into effect on 31 May 2019 upon publication in the Official Gazette of the Federation.

The law was amended to formally permit same-sex marriage on 14 June 2023.

=== Oaxaca ===
On 26 August 2012, a federal court judge ordered the state of Oaxaca to perform same-sex marriages based on a constitutional amendment which bans discrimination based on sexual orientation. This ruling was reviewed by the Supreme Court, which issued a unanimous ruling against the ban on same-sex marriage.

In July 2017, a same-sex couple was successful in getting married without first receiving a court order. From late August 2018, the Civil Registry has allowed same-sex couples to marry without the need for an amparo. However, the process took three business days, compared with two hours for opposite-sex couples.

On 28 August 2019, the Congress of Oaxaca passed legislation bringing the state into line with the executive order.

=== Puebla ===
On 7 December 2006, a similar civil union bill to that of Mexico City was proposed in Puebla, but it faced strong opposition and criticism from deputies of the Institutional Revolutionary Party (PRI) and the National Action Party (PAN), who declared that "the traditional family is the only social model, and there cannot be another one." Though proposals were presented in 2011 and repeatedly introduced in successive years, no change to the law was approved by the legislatures.

On 27 April 2016, an action of unconstitutionality was filed before the Supreme Court. On 1 August 2017, the Supreme Court unanimously declared same-sex marriage to be legal in Puebla, striking down the Civil Code which limited marriage to one man and one woman for the purpose of procreation, and eliminating the need for individual amparos. The ruling came into effect on 16 February 2018, after publication in the Official Diary of the Federation. Shortly after the ruling, Puebla officials confirmed that same-sex couples are allowed to adopt.

The Congress of Puebla passed a bill codifying the legality of same-sex marriage on 3 November 2020.

=== Querétaro ===
The Legislature of Querétaro passed a bill to amend the state civil code to allow same-sex marriage on 22 September 2021. It will take effect upon publication in the official gazette.

On 21 July 2015, the civil registrar of the municipality of Santiago de Querétaro, which comprises 46% of the state's population, announced that same-sex couples may marry in the municipality without the need for an amparo. As of January 2017, seven other municipalities in the state are marrying same-sex couples without requiring them to receive an amparo beforehand: Amealco de Bonfil, Cadereyta de Montes, Ezequiel Montes, Huimilpan, Pedro Escobedo, San Joaquín and Tolimán, comprising 60% of the state's population altogether. The state legislature legalized same-sex marriage statewide on 22 September 2021.

=== Quintana Roo ===
Same-sex marriages can be performed in Quintana Roo after a decision by the state's Secretary of State. In November 2011, some public officials in the state began performing same-sex marriages after reviewing the state's Civil Code. The Civil Code of Quintana Roo does not state sex or gender requirements for marriage, only specifying "people interested in getting married". A same-sex couple filed for a marriage license in Cancún and Chetumal after discovering this legal quirk, but both cities rejected their applications, arguing that a man-woman marriage was implied. The couple then applied in Lázaro Cárdenas Municipality, where authorities accepted the application. Quintana Roo's first two same-sex marriages were held in the community of Kantunilkin on 28 November 2011. In May 2012, the Secretary of State issued a decision allowing for future same-sex marriages to be performed in Quintana Roo.

In November 2014, it was announced that a bill to officially legalize same-sex marriage in the state would be introduced and voted on in the current legislative session, thereby replacing the loophole used by couples. In May 2017, a new same-sex marriage bill was introduced to the state Congress.

=== San Luis Potosí ===
On 28 April 2014, a citizens' initiative to legalize same-sex marriage was submitted to the Congress of San Luis Potosí. On 8 August 2014, the Deputy Chairman of the Commission on Human Rights and Gender Equity, Miguel Maza Hernández, said that analysis of the proposal would begin. On 17 June 2015, Maza Hernández announced the state's commitment to extending marriage to same-sex couples and stated that deliberations would happen after the June 2015 Supreme Court ruling declaring all laws against same-sex marriage unconstitutional is published in the judicial gazette. On 6 June 2016, it was announced that a special committee would study the marriage bill and vote on it within 90 days. In November 2016, the state Congress voted against the bill legalizing same-sex marriage. One PRD deputy, who mistakenly voted against the bill, announced that he would introduce a new same-sex marriage proposal in 2017.

The new bill was introduced in October 2017. It was approved by the state Congress on 16 May 2019, in a vote of 14–12, with 1 abstention and signed by the Governor on 20 May 2019.

=== Sinaloa ===
In January 2013, the Family Code of the state of Sinaloa was changed to limit marriage or cohabitation to couples consisting of a man and a woman. Three injunctions were filed to contest the changes, but two were dismissed.

On 2 September 2014, Deputy Sandra Lara launched an initiative to amend articles 40 and 165 of the Family Code and allow for same-sex marriage in the state. In February 2015, the conservative National Action Party (PAN) introduced a civil union bill which would have banned children of same-sex partners from residing with their same-sex parents. In July 2017, PAN and the New Alliance Party of Sinaloa announced their support for same-sex marriages. According to a September 2017 poll, 57% of Sinaloans supported same-sex marriage. The July 2018 elections resulted in MORENA, a pro-same-sex marriage party, winning the majority of legislative seats in Sinaloa.

On 25 November 2016, the Supreme Court issued its fifth resolution against Sinaloa's same-sex marriage ban. The Court declared the state's same-sex marriage ban unconstitutional, void and inoperable. According to local LGBT activists however, state authorities deliberately delayed the legalization of same-sex marriage. On 15 May 2018, following approximately 17 months of delay, the Supreme Court ordered the state to legalize same-sex marriage within 90 days or face unspecified consequences. However, that deadline also passed without the state legalizing same-sex marriage. On 19 June 2019, Congress rejected proposed same-sex marriage legislation by 20 to 18, including six legislators from MORENA voting against.

On 12 June 2021, a federal court ordered the Sinaloa Congress to legalize same-sex marriage within three days, with any legislators who vote against the bill to be found in contempt of court and unable to run for or hold office for seven years. On 15 June 2021, the Sinaloa Congress voted 23–0 to pass the bill legalizing same-sex marriage in the state, with all dissenters marking themselves absent for the vote. It took effect one day after being published in the official gazette on 29 June 2021.

=== Sonora ===
Same-sex couples could marry only with the assistance of an amparo (court order) until 11 May 2016, when the Director of the State Civil Registry, Martha Julissa Bojórquez Castillo, announced that same-sex couples could begin marrying in the state without the need for an amparo. However, on 18 May 2016, the Governor ordered all civil registries in the state to retain the existing statutory ban on same-sex marriage and only provide same-sex couples with marriage certificates if they successfully receive an amparo.

In September 2017, all political parties in the state agreed to begin analyzing a proposed same-sex marriage bill. The bill's main sponsor said he was hopeful it would be accepted.

The July 2018 elections resulted in pro-same-sex marriage parties winning a majority of legislative seats in Sonora. On 23 September 2021, the Congress of Sonora passed a bill legalizing same-sex marriage throughout the state. It went into force on 22 October.

=== Tabasco ===
The Congress of Tabasco passed a bill to reform the state civil code to allow same-sex marriage on 19 October 2022. It was scheduled to take effect on 30 October 2022.

After Mexico City's Legislative Assembly legalized same-sex marriages and LGBT adoption in December 2009, debate resurged in states where civil unions had been previously proposed. In 2009, in the southeastern state of Tabasco, 20 same-sex couples sent a motion to the state Congress, asking it to allow them to marry. The state's largest political parties, the Institutional Revolutionary Party (PRI) and the Party of the Democratic Revolution (PRD), announced their support for same-sex marriage in 2010. Despite the support of political parties, there was no legislative will to change the law, so in April 2014 an initiative to reform Article 154 of the Civil Code of the State of Tabasco and legalize same-sex marriage was presented by the organization Tabasco Unites for Diversity and Sexual Health (Spanish: Tabasqueños Unidos por la Diversidad y la Salud Sexual; Tudyssex). PRD submitted its own same-sex marriage and adoption bill on 3 July 2015.

The July 2018 elections resulted in MORENA, a pro-same-sex marriage party, winning the majority of legislative seats and the governorship. The Congress passed the same-sex marriage bill on 19 October 2022 with a 23–5 vote. It was signed by Governor Carlos Manuel Merino Campos, and published in the official state journal on 26 October, taking effect the next day.

=== Tamaulipas ===
The Congress of Tamaulipas passed a bill to reform the state civil code to allow same-sex marriage on 26 October 2022 in a 23–12 vote. It was the final state to legalize same-sex marriage.

In 2011, a bill to provide "coexistence" for same-sex couples was promoted by local organizations in Tamaulipas. In 2012, organizers presented legislators with 25,000 signatures in favor of same-sex marriage. In 2013, the PRD agreed to bring the issue to the Congress of Tamaulipas and support the proposal. In June 2015, Deputy Olga Sosa Ruiz confirmed that the Congress of Tamaulipas was working on a bill to legalize same-sex marriage. She stated that the reform is complex as they are attempting to remove all discriminatory terms and are working with the Gender Equality Commission. She predicted that the law would be passed within the next legislative session, though no bill has passed as of October 2022.

In September 2018, the Supreme Court began proceedings against Tamaulipas' same-sex marriage ban. On 16 November 2018, the Court issued its fifth resolution against Tamaulipas, declaring the state's marriage ban unconstitutional and ordering the state to modify it within 180 business days.

Tamaulipas was one of four states without same-sex marriage where pro-same-sex marriage parties did not win a majority of legislative seats in the 2018 election. However, the other three had all passed same-sex marriage legislation by early 2022. A state deputy filed a lawsuit with the Supreme Court against the state, to force it to comply with the earlier ruling. A bill to legalize same-sex marriage was passed through the commission stage on a 14–1 vote on 19 October 2022. It was then passed by the unicameral Congress of Tamaulipas on 26 October 2022 with 23 votes in favour and 12 against, and was published in the government gazette on 18 November.

=== Tlaxcala ===
On 29 December 2016, the Congress of Tlaxcala approved a coexistence bill. The bill established civil unions, under the name sociedad de convivencia solidaria, which provides cohabiting same-sex and opposite-sex couples with many of the same rights and obligations of marriage. It was published in the official journal, following the Governor's signature, on 11 January 2017 and took effect the following day.

On 13 October 2017, the New Alliance Party introduced a same-sex marriage bill to the State Congress. The July 2018 elections resulted in MORENA and the Labor Party, pro-same-sex marriage parties, winning the majority of legislative seats in Tlaxcala.

On 8 December 2020, the Congress of Tlaxcala approved a marriage-equality bill in a 16–3 vote.

=== Veracruz ===
Same-sex marriage was approved by the Congress of Veracruz in a 38–4 vote on 2 June 2022, three days after the Supreme Court of Justice of the Nation ruled that articles of the state Civil Code that barred same-sex couples from marriage were invalid.

Congress had previously enacted recognition of same-sex concubinage in May 2020.

In September 2016, the head of Veracruz's adoption agency announced that same-sex couples may adopt children jointly in the state. In April 2017, the Civil Registry of Xalapa announced its support for same-sex marriage. On 20 February 2017, Governor Miguel Ángel Yunes issued an executive order legalizing same-sex marriage in the state. Four days later, following protests from Catholic groups, Governor Yunes repealed the order. Following the repeal of the order, LGBT activists announced they were filing a case to legalize same-sex marriage in the state. On 20 July 2017, the case against the Governor and the state's same-sex marriage ban was filed before the Fourth District Court.

On 7 November 2017, the Court issued its ruling in the case, declaring the state's ban on same-sex marriage unconstitutional. Some LGBT groups had suggested that the ruling effectively legalizes same-sex marriage in the state, though state officials announced that they would continue to enforce the state's marriage ban.

In July 2018, as one of their last actions before leaving office, PAN submitted a proposal to Congress to explicitly ban same-sex marriage in the state Constitution. It failed to pass, with 32 deputies in favor, 10 against and 2 abstentions. It needed 33 votes to pass, thus failing by one vote.

=== Yucatán ===
The Yucatán state congress legalized same-sex marriage in a unanimous vote on 1 March 2022, after it overwhelmingly approved a state constitutional amendment in August 2021 that would permit same-sex marriage legislation.

The local Congress had overwhelmingly approved a constitutional ban on same-sex marriage in a 24–1 vote on 21 July 2009. The bill was promoted by right-wing organization Pro Yucatán Network to reject all efforts by people of the same sex to form a family and adopt children. PAN politicians justified the ban alleging that "there still aren't adequate conditions within Yucatán society to allow for unions between people of the same sex". The event led to protests outside the local Congress by LGBT organizations, whose leaders were expected to appeal the case to the Supreme Court.

Political party	Members	Yes	No
Institutional Revolutionary Party	14	14	
National Action Party	9	9	
Party of the Democratic Revolution	1		1
Labor Party / Convergence	1	1	
Total	25	24	1

On 17 May 2014, a group of civil society organizations brought a legal action before the Constitutional Court of the State of Yucatán under the guise of "correcting a legislative omission." It was the first time a mechanism to correct an omission had been used in Mexico as the basis of a suit. The organizations claimed 10 injunctions had been approved in the state without legislative action. The suit asked for Articles 49 and 94 of the Family Code which limit marriage to one man and one woman to be "considered in the broadest sense and that the gender of its members be undefined." On 2 March 2015, the Yucatán court dismissed the appeal for constitutional action to change the Civil Code. Supporters of amending the code vowed to appeal the decision. In June 2015, they filed a lawsuit against the Yucatán court in federal court. The suit argued that the Yucatán court's decision was flawed as the Constitution prohibits discrimination on the basis of sexual orientation. After postponing a hearing five times, the Supreme Court dismissed the lawsuit on 31 May 2017.

On 24 May 2016, a prominent member of the state Congress stated that Yucatán would wait for the Congress of the Union to legislate on same-sex marriage before taking the necessary steps to legalize it. In September 2017, the Yucatán Congress unanimously approved a PRD-proposed bill to begin discussion on issues that had previously been neglected and not discussed, including same-sex marriage. On 15 August 2018, Governor Rolando Zapata Bello introduced bills to amend the state Constitution and Family Code to legalize same-sex marriage. On 10 April 2019, the state Congress rejected an amendment to repeal the constitutional ban on same-sex marriage, in a 9–15 vote. In response to the failure to pass legislation, the 17th Pride Parade in Mérida saw the unprecedented participation of around 8,000 people. A second attempt at legalizing same-sex marriage failed on 15 July 2019, with 15 votes against and 9 votes in favor.

On 25 August 2021, the Congress of Yucatán approved in a 20–5 vote a bill that would repeal the heterosexual definition of marriage in the state constitution, thus allowing same-sex marriage. The bill was signed by the Governor on 3 September 2021 and published on 7 September 2021. Congress had 180 days from that date (i.e., until 6 March 2022) to amend all laws, including the Family Code, to conform with the new wording of the constitution. The state congress voted unanimously to pass secondary legislation allowing same-sex marriage on 1 March 2022.

=== Zacatecas ===
On 18 June 2015, a member of PRD announced that she would submit a bill to reform the state's Civil and Family Codes to give same-sex couples the same rights as heterosexual married couples.

The July 2018 elections resulted in pro-same-sex marriage parties winning a majority of legislative seats in Zacatecas.

On 14 February 2019, the city of Zacatecas announced it would begin issuing same-sex marriage certificates. Despite claims from the Governor that the marriages would be void, and calls from Bishop Sigifredo Noriega to stop the marriages, the first couple married on 23 February. The municipality of Cuauhtémoc followed suit on 1 March, while a new same-sex marriage bill was introduced to the state Congress around that time. Villanueva followed suit on 20 May 2019.

On 14 August 2019, the state Congress rejected a bill to legalize same-sex marriage, in 11–13 vote, with 2 abstentions.

On 14 December 2021, the state Congress approved a bill to legalize same-sex marriage, in 18–10 vote, with 1 abstention. It took effect on 30 December 2021, the day after its publication in the official gazette.

== Marriage statistics ==
In 2020, 335,563 marriages were celebrated in Mexico. Of these, 2,476 (0.7%) were between same-sex partners.

== Public opinion ==
Public support of same-sex marriage in Mexico, as of 2017 > 60% > 50% > 40%

In a Parametría poll, conducted from 17 to 20 November 2006, 1,200 Mexican adults were asked if they would support a constitutional amendment that would legalize same-sex marriage in Mexico. 17% responded yes, 61% said no and 14% had no opinion. The same poll showed 28% in support of same-sex civil unions, 41% were opposed and 28% had no opinion. From 27 to 30 November 2009, major newspaper El Universal polled 1,000 Mexico City citizens concerning the legalization of same-sex marriage in the city. 50% supported it, 38% were against it and 12% had no idea. The same poll showed that support was stronger among the youngest population (age: 18–29), 67%, and weaker among the oldest (age: 50-onwards), 38%. With 48%, the most cited reason was "right of choice" for the supporters, followed by "everybody is equal" with 14%. 39% of the opposers cited "it is not normal" as the main reason to not support same-sex marriage, followed by "we lose values" with 18%.

Guillermo Bustamante Manilla, a PAN member and president of the National Union of Parents of Families (Spanish: Unión Nacional de Padres de Familia), as well as the father of Guillermo Bustamante Artasánchez, a law director of the Secretary of the Interior, opposes abortion and same-sex civil unions and has described the latter as "anti-natural." He has publicly asked voters not to cast votes for "abortionists" parties and those who are in favor of homosexual relationships.

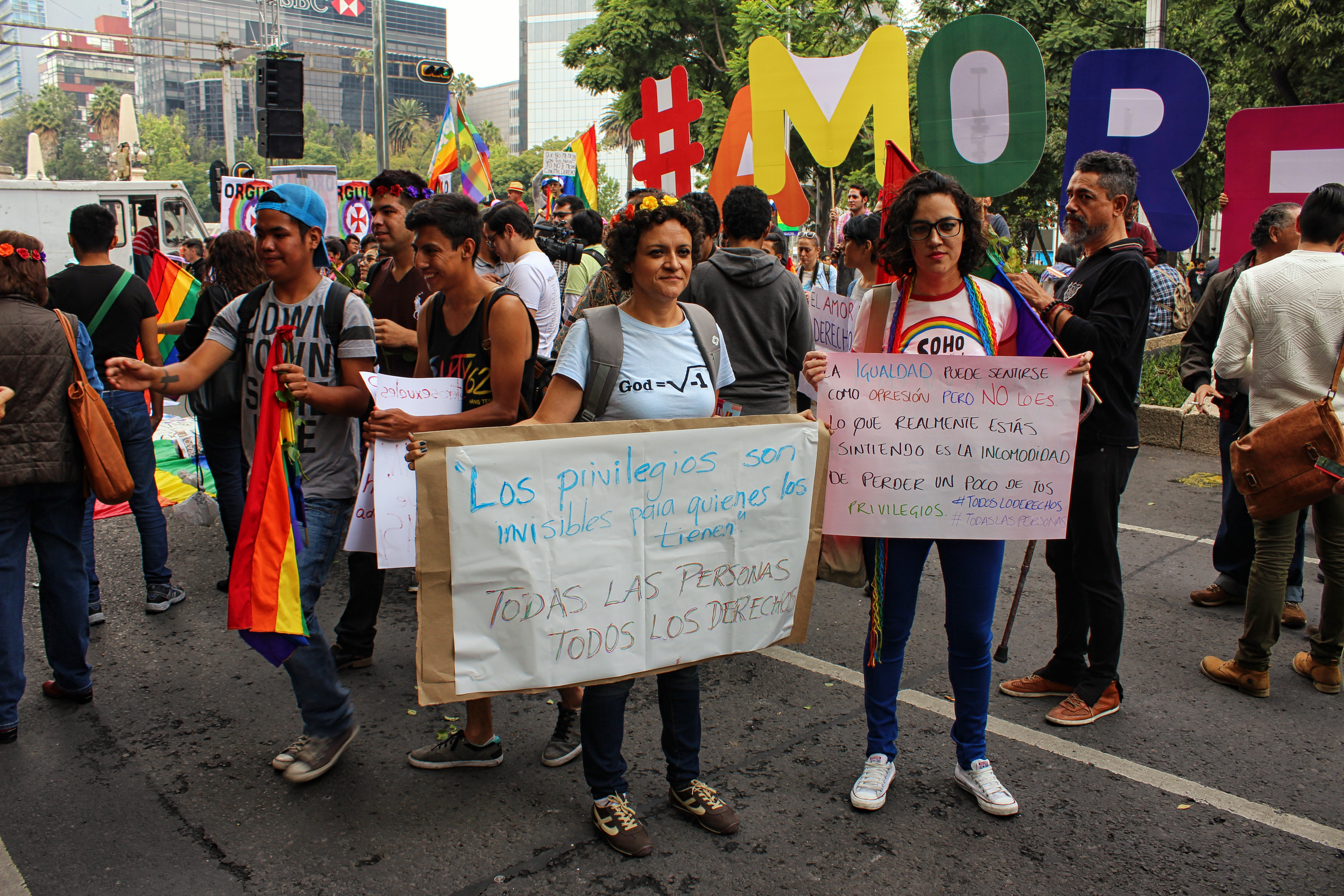
The Marcha TodosSomosFamilia in Mexico City in 2016, campaigning for same-sex marriage rights

A study conducted by Vanderbilt University in 2010 concluded that 37.8% of Mexicans supported same-sex marriage.

A poll conducted in July 2013 found a significant increase in support for same-sex marriage, with 52% of Mexicans in favour of legalising same-sex marriage. When broken down by religion, support was 52% among Roman Catholics and 62% among non-religious people. However, in the same poll, only 24% of respondents supported same-sex adoption.

According to a Pew Research Center survey, conducted between 30 October and 12 November 2013, 49% of Mexicans supported same-sex marriage, 43% were opposed.

In early 2014, the Strategic Communication Cabinet, a statistical consulting services company, published a report called "Social Intolerance in Mexico", in which polls that covered several social issues were conducted in the 45 largest cities and municipalities. The study found that the strongest support for same-sex marriages was registered in Mexico City, Tijuana, San Luis Potosí, Colima and La Paz; whereas it was the weakest in Durango, Ciudad Victoria, Aguascalientes, Chihuahua and Monterrey. Additionally, adoption by same-sex couples was more widely accepted in Mexico City, the border cities of Tijuana and Ciudad Juárez, as well as Xalapa and Cancún; meanwhile the least support was found in Chihuahua, Guadalajara, Aguascalientes, Durango and Campeche.

Following President Enrique Peña Nieto's proposal to legalize same-sex marriage in Mexico in May 2016, a poll on the issue was carried out by Gabinete de Comunicación Estratégica. 69% of respondents were in favor of the change. 64% said they saw it as an advance in the recognition of human rights. Public opinion changed radically over the course of 16 years. In 2000, 62% felt that same-sex marriage should not be allowed under any circumstances. In 2016, only 25% felt that way. In addition, a BGC-Excélsior survey conducted the same month found similar numbers: 65% of Mexicans expressed support for same-sex marriage. However, a poll conducted by Parametría that same month found completely opposite figures. According to the polling firm, 59% of Mexicans opposed same-sex marriage.

The 2017 AmericasBarometer showed that 51% of Mexicans supported same-sex marriage.

A 2017 survey by the National Institute of Statistics and Geography (INEGI) found that opposition to same-sex marriage was most marked in southern Mexico, namely the states of Chiapas (58.7%), Tabasco (56.5%), Campeche (56.1%), Veracruz (54.3%) and Guerrero (54.0%). It was lowest in the central and northwestern parts of the country, with Mexico City (28.6%), Baja California (30.7%), Sonora (31.4%), Querétaro (32.4%) and México (33.8%) being the five states/districts with the least opposition. Overall, 42.6% men and 38.5% women in Mexico opposed same-sex marriage.

A study by the National Institute of Statistics and Geography (INEGI) in 2022 indicated that 76% of Mexicans supported same-sex marriage.

A Pew Research Center poll conducted between February and May 2023 showed that 63% of Mexicans supported same-sex marriage, 32% were opposed and 5% did not know or refused to answer. When divided by age, support was 77% among 18-39-year-olds and 49% among 40-plus-year-olds.

== See also ==
- LGBT rights in Mexico
- Recognition of same-sex unions in the Americas
