= Same-sex marriage in Yucatán =

Same-sex marriage has been legal in Yucatán since 4 March 2022. On 1 March, the Congress of Yucatán passed same-sex marriage legislation by a unanimous 25–0 vote. The law, supported by Governor Mauricio Vila Dosal, took effect three days later, making Yucatán the 25th Mexican state to legalize same-sex marriage. Previously, same-sex couples were only able to marry in Yucatán, and in the rest of Mexico, through the judicial recurso de amparo remedy. The first same-sex marriage in Yucatán occurred in Mérida in August 2013. In June 2015, the Supreme Court of Justice of the Nation ruled that the Constitution of Mexico guarantees same-sex couples the right to marry and standardized the procedures for courts to approve applications for same-sex marriages through the amparo remedy.

Yucatán was one of only three states to have enacted a constitutional ban on same-sex marriages, amending the State Constitution in 2009 to define marriage as being between heterosexual couples. Congress passed legislation repealing this constitutional ban on 25 August 2021. The repeal bill entered into force on 7 September 2021.

== Legal history ==
=== Background ===
The Supreme Court of Justice of the Nation ruled on 12 June 2015 that state bans on same-sex marriage are unconstitutional nationwide. The court's ruling is considered a "jurisprudential thesis" and did not invalidate state laws, meaning that same-sex couples denied the right to marry would still have to seek individual amparos (Spanish pronunciation: [amˈpaɾo]; Yucatec Maya: áantaj p’is óolalo’) in court. The ruling standardized the procedures for judges and courts throughout Mexico to approve all applications for same-sex marriages and made the approval mandatory. Specifically, the court ruled that bans on same-sex marriage violate Articles 1 and 4 of the Constitution of Mexico. Article 1 of the Constitution states:

Any form of discrimination, based on ethnic or national origin, gender, age, disabilities, social status, medical conditions, religion, opinions, sexual orientation, marital status, or any other form, which violates the human dignity or seeks to annul or diminish the rights and freedoms of the people, is prohibited. (Note: In some official and indigenous languages of Yucatán: Spanish: Queda prohibida toda discriminación motivada por origen étnico o nacional, el género, la edad, las discapacidades, la condición social, las condiciones de salud, la religión, las opiniones, las preferencias sexuales, el estado civil o cualquier otra que atente contra la dignidad humana y tenga por objeto anular o menoscabar los derechos y libertades de las personas.; Yucatec Maya: Ku we’et’el tuláakal péech’ óolal chéen tu yóok’olal u ch’i’ibalil wáaj u nojlu’umil u taalbal máak, u wíiniknáalil, u ja'abil, u yaayaj óolalil, bix yanil u kuxtal yéetel u toj óolalil, u yoksajk’uujil, ba'ax yaan tu tuukul, máax uts tu yich, bix anil tu táan kaaj, wáaj tu yóok’olal uláak’ ba’al beetik k’aas ti’ u tsikbe’enil máak, yéetel u tuukulil u xu’ulsik wáaj u péets’ óoltik u páajtalil yéetel u jáalk’abilo’ob máak.)

On 26 March 2013, a same-sex couple, Ricardo Arturo Góngora and Javier Carrillo Esquivel, applied for a marriage license at the civil registry office in Mérida. Officials rejected their application, arguing that the State Constitution defined marriage as the "union of a man and a woman" and that same-sex couples were therefore unable to legally marry. The couple challenged the decision, and on 1 July the Third District Court recognized that they had the right to marry. The government announced it would not appeal the court ruling, and they became the first same-sex couple to marry in Yucatán on 8 August. Subsequently, six more couples applied for marriage licenses on 14 August. They filed individual amparos, with three of them being approved on 4 and 15 November and 17 December 2013 by the courts in the First, Fourth and Third districts, respectively. The first lesbian marriage took place in Mérida on 6 January 2014 for one of the plaintiff couples. A second lesbian couple married on 25 January, and a male couple were married on 18 February 2014. Between January and March 2017, fifteen same-sex couples were married in Yucatán using the recurso de amparo remedy, compared to sixteen couples during all of 2016.

On 17 May 2014, a group of civil society organizations filed a lawsuit with the Constitutional Court of Yucatán, arguing that although ten amparos had been approved in the preceding months, the Congress had failed to amend local laws to allow same-sex marriage. The plaintiffs asked that article 49 of the Family Code and Article 94 of the Constitution, which limited marriage to "one man and one woman", be "considered in the broadest sense and that the gender of its members be undefined." On 26 February 2015, the court announced that it would rule on 2 March whether the state ban on same-sex marriage violated the Constitution of Mexico. Instead, on 2 March the court dismissed the challenge. Activists vowed to appeal the decision. They filed an appeal with the Supreme Court in June 2015. The activists argued that the ban was unconstitutional as the Mexican Constitution prohibits discrimination on the basis of sexual orientation. After postponing a hearing five times, the Supreme Court dismissed the lawsuit on 31 May 2017.

=== Constitutional restrictions ===
On 21 July 2009, the Congress of Yucatán approved a constitutional ban on same-sex marriage in a 24–1 vote. The law, promoted by the right-wing organization Pro Yucatán Network, raised heterosexual marriage and families to the constitutional level. Specifically, Article 94 was amended to read that marriage is "the union of a man and a woman". This was widely interpreted as an effort to preempt the legalization of same-sex marriage in the state, as any future attempt to permit it would similarly necessitate a constitutional amendment and a two-thirds majority in Congress. Politicians from the conservative National Action Party (PAN) justified the ban, alleging that "there still [wasn't] adequate conditions within Yucatán society to allow for unions between people of the same sex". The event led to protests outside the Congress building by LGBT organizations.

21 July 2009 vote in the Congress
Party	Voted for	Voted against	Abstained	Absent (Did not vote)
Institutional Revolutionary Party	14: Efraín Aguilar Góngora; Cornelio Aguilar Puc; Roger Alcocer García; Jorge Berlín Montero; Martín Castillo Ruz; Felipe Cervera Hernández; Víctor Chi Trujeque; Enrique Magadán Villamil; Ismael Peraza Valdéz; Gaspar Quintal Parra; Luis Rodríguez Canto; Gabriela Santinelli Recio; Elsa Sarabia Cruz; Marco Vela Reyes	–	–	–
National Action Party	9: José Aragón Uicab; Daniel Ávila Ruiz; Patricia Gamboa Wong; Julio Garrido Rojas; Rodolfo González Crespo; Alba Martínez Cortés; María Pavía González; Ramón Salazar Esquer; Carlota Storey Montalvo	–	–	–
Party of the Democratic Revolution	–	1: Bertha Pérez Medina	–	–
Todos Somos Yucatán (Note: Electoral alliance composed of the Labor Party and Convergence)	1: María Candila Echeverría	–	–	–
Total	24	1	0	0
Total	96.0%	4.0%	0.0%	0.0%

Yucatán had been one of only three Mexican states to enact a constitutional ban on same-sex marriage; the others being Baja California, and Colima. As of September 2021, all three of these bans have been repealed.

=== Passage of legislation in 2021 and 2022 ===
Same-sex marriage in Mexico

On 24 May 2016, Deputy Celia Rivas Rodríguez of the Institutional Revolutionary Party (PRI) said that the Congress of Yucatán would likely wait for the federal Congress of the Union to legislate on same-sex marriage before taking the necessary steps to amend local laws. On 15 August 2018, Governor Rolando Zapata Bello introduced bills to amend the Constitution and the Family Code to legalize same-sex marriage. Congress rejected the bill in a 9–15 vote on 10 April 2019. In response, a pride parade in Mérida in June saw the unprecedented participation of around 8,000 people. A second attempt at legalizing same-sex marriage failed on 15 July 2019, again with 15 votes against and 9 votes in favor. In both cases, Congress voted against same-sex marriage in a secret vote, without the public being able to have knowledge of the votes cast by their representatives. This was controversial, and several activists from the Collective for the Protection of All Families of Yucatán (Colectivo de Protección de Todas las Familias de Yucatán) filed a legal challenge with the Supreme Court arguing that this was unconstitutional. On 18 August 2021, the Supreme Court ordered an "open and transparent" re-vote in Congress. Two months earlier, a federal court in Sinaloa had ordered that state's legislature to legalize same-sex marriage, with any legislators voting against to be found in contempt of court and unable to run for or hold office for seven years. Fearful that lawmakers in Yucatán could face similar charges, Congress was widely expected to approve a same-sex marriage bill in the coming days.

Legislation to remove the constitutional ban on same-sex marriage was sponsored by deputies Milagros Romero Bastarrachea and Silvia López Scoffie. The measure would also recognise same-sex concubinage. It was approved unanimously by a Congress committee, and a plenary vote was scheduled for Wednesday, 25 August 2021. Congress passed the bill on a 20–5 vote on 25 August, reaching the two-thirds majority needed to amend the Constitution. Deputy Karla Franco Blanco said that the passage of the bill "[was] in line with the fundamental principle that every individual has the right to enjoy freedoms, equal rights and protection from discrimination, as provided by the Political Constitution of [Mexico]." The law was published in the state's official gazette on 6 September 2021, and took effect the following day. Governor Mauricio Vila Dosal praised the vote. Article 94 of the Constitution of Yucatán was amended as follows: Marriage is an institution through which the legal union of two people is established, with equal rights, duties, and obligations, and with the possibility of human reproduction in a free, responsible, and informed manner. (Note: Spanish: El matrimonio es una institución por medio del cual se establece la unión jurídica de dos personas, con igualdad de derechos, deberes y obligaciones, con la posibilidad de generar la reproducción humana de manera libre, responsable e informada.)

25 August 2021 vote in the Congress
Party	Voted for	Voted against	Abstained	Absent (Did not vote)
Institutional Revolutionary Party	8: Luis Borjas Romero; Martín Castillo Ruz; Felipe Cervera Hernández; Lizzete Escobedo Salazar; Karla Franco Blanco; Lila Frías Castillo; Warnel May Escobar; María Moisés Escalante	2: Mirthea Arjona Martin; Marcos Rodríguez Ruz	–	–
National Action Party	3: Kathia Bolio Pinelo; Miguel Rodríguez Baqueiro; Paulina Viana Gómez	3: Rosa Díaz Lizama; Manuel Díaz Suárez; Víctor Sánchez Roca	–	–
National Regeneration Movement	4: Miguel Candila Noh; Leticia Euan Mis; Luis Loeza Pacheco; Fátima Perera Salazar	–	–	–
Citizens' Movement	2: Silvia López Escoffié; María Romero Bastarrachea	–	–	–
Ecologist Green Party of Mexico	1: Harry Botello Fierro	–	–	–
New Alliance Party	1: Luis Aguilar Castillo	–	–	–
Party of the Democratic Revolution	1: Mario Cuevas Mena	–	–	–
Total	20	5	0	0
Total	80.0%	20.0%	0.0%	0.0%

Although Congress modified the Constitution to repeal the ban on same-sex marriages, it did not amend the Family Code. Deputy Romero Bastarrachea said in an interview with the media after the vote that Congress would amend all statutory laws within 180 days of the bill's publication (i.e. by 6 March 2022). (Note: Page 8 of decree 413/2021 published in the official gazette on 6 September 2021: El Congreso del Estado de Yucatán, en un plazo no mayor a 180 días naturales contados a partir de la entrada en vigor de este decreto, deberá realizar las adecuaciones a la legislación secundaria que correspondan. (translating to "The Congress of the State of Yucatan, within a period not exceeding 180 calendar days from the entry into force of this decree, shall pass the appropriate secondary legislation.")) A bill to legalize same-sex marriage was introduced to Congress on 15 December 2021 by Deputy Life Goméz Herrera of Citizens' Movement. It was approved unanimously by a Congress committee on 26 February, and in a 25–0 vote by Congress on 1 March 2022. The law was published in the official gazette on 3 March, and took effect the following day. The first same-sex couple to marry in Yucatán under the new law were Irving Suárez Pérez and Luciano Martínez Tzuc, a couple for 18 years, on 4 March in Mérida.

1 March 2022 vote in the Congress
Party	Voted for	Voted against	Abstained	Absent (Did not vote)
National Action Party	14: Esteban Abraham Macari; Karem Achach Ramírez; Manuela Cocom Bolio; Luis Fernández Vidal; Abril Ferreyro Rosado; Melba Gamboa Ávila; Carmen González Martín; Dafne López Osorio; Victor Lozano Poveda; Jesús Pérez Ballote; Erik Rihani González; Raúl Romero Chel; Karla Salazar González; Ingrid Santos Díaz	–	–	–
National Regeneration Movement	4: Algeria Be Chan; Rafael Echazarreta Torres; Alejandra Novelo Segura; Jazmín Villanueva Moo	–	–	–
Institutional Revolutionary Party	3: Karla Franco Blanco; Fabiola Loeza Novelo; Gaspar Quintal Parra	–	–	–
Citizens' Movement	1: Life Gómez Herrera	–	–	–
Ecologist Green Party of Mexico	1: Harry Botello Fierro	–	–	–
New Alliance Party	1: José Gutiérrez González	–	–	–
Party of the Democratic Revolution	1: Eduardo Sobrino Sierra	–	–	–
Total	25	0	0	0
Total	100.0%	0.0%	0.0%	0.0%

In public discourse, same-sex marriage is commonly known as matrimonio igualitario (pronounced [matɾiˈmonjo jɣwaliˈtaɾjo]) or matrimonio para todos (pronounced [matɾiˈmonjo ˈpaɾa ˈtoðos]) in Spanish, and as ts’o’okol beel tia’al tuláakal (pronounced [ˈtzʼó̰ːkol ɓèːl tiˈá̰ːl tuˈláːkal]) in Yucatec Maya.

== Native Mexicans ==
While many Indigenous cultures historically practiced polygamy to some extent, there are no records of same-sex marriages being performed in these cultures in the way they are commonly defined in Western legal systems. However, many Indigenous communities recognize identities and relationships that may be placed on the LGBT spectrum. The Yucatec Maya recognized certain forms of institutionalised same-sex relations. Some shamans engaged in homosexual acts with their patients, and priests engaged in ritualized homosexual acts with their gods. Anthropologist Walter Lee Williams wrote with respect to the Yucatec Maya: "After my arrival in Yucatán, I soon learned that the society provides a de facto acceptance of same-sex relations for males. It did not take long to establish contacts, and my informants suggested that a large majority of the male population is at certain times sexually active with other males. This usually occurs in the years between thirteen and thirty, when sexual desire is strongest, but it also involves men older than that. Marriage to a woman does not seem to have much effect on the occurrence and amount of homosexual behavior." Carvings, rituals and stories were explicit about sexual diversity.

== Marriage statistics ==
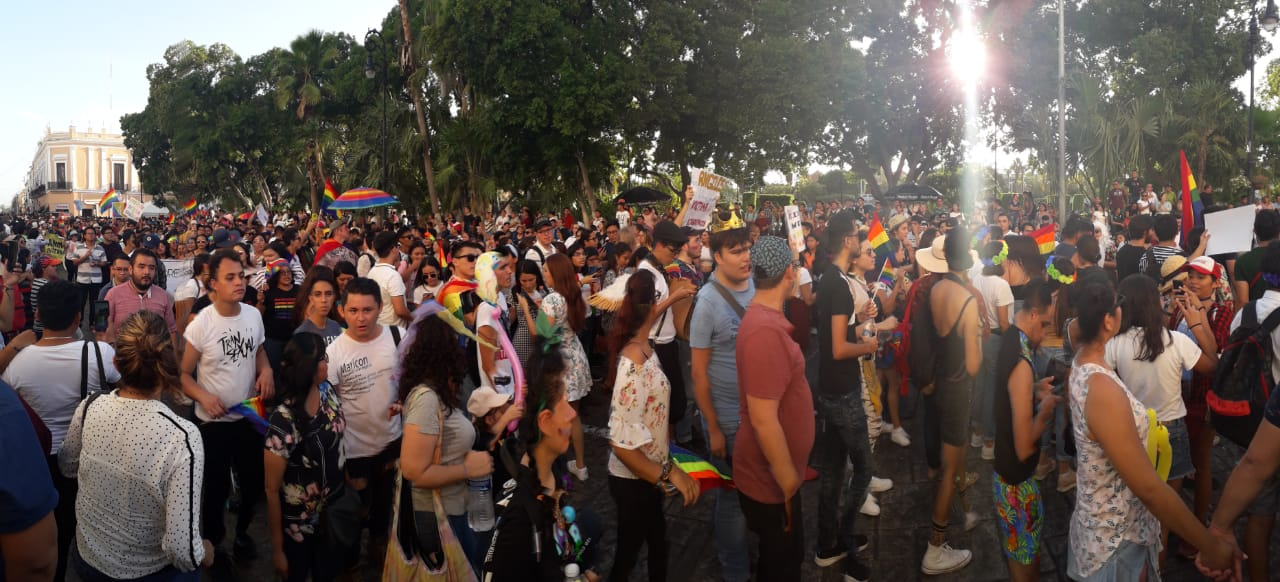
Participants at a pride parade in Mérida calling for the legalization of same-sex marriage, 8 June 2019

The following table shows the number of same-sex marriages performed in Yucatán since 2023 as reported by the National Institute of Statistics and Geography.

Number of marriages performed in Yucatán
Year	Same-sex			Opposite-sex	Total	% same-sex
Year	Female	Male	Total	Opposite-sex	Total	% same-sex
2023	17	21	38	9,448	9,486	0.40%
2024	17	4	21	9,497	9,518	0.22%
2025	36	20	56	11,238	11,294	0.50%

== Public opinion ==
According to a 2018 survey by the National Institute of Statistics and Geography, 43% of the Yucatán public opposed same-sex marriage.

== See also ==
- Same-sex marriage in Mexico
- LGBT rights in Mexico
