= Same-sex marriage in Campeche =

Same-sex marriage has been legal in Campeche since 20 May 2016. In April 2016, Governor Alejandro Moreno Cárdenas introduced a same-sex marriage bill to the Congress of Campeche, which approved it on 10 May by 34 votes to 1 with support from all political parties. The law entered into force 10 days later. Campeche was the sixth Mexican state to legalize same-sex marriage. Previously, same-sex couples were only able to marry in Campeche, and in the rest of Mexico, through the judicial recurso de amparo remedy. The first same-sex marriage in Campeche occurred in San Francisco de Campeche in August 2014. In June 2015, the Supreme Court of Justice of the Nation ruled that the Constitution of Mexico guarantees same-sex couples the right to marry and standardized the procedures for courts to approve applications for same-sex marriages through the amparo remedy.

Congress also enacted a law permitting same-sex civil unions in December 2013, which provide several of the rights and benefits of marriage.

== Civil unions ==
On 11 April 2013, the Party of the Democratic Revolution (PRD) introduced a measure to legalize civil unions (Spanish: sociedad civil de convivencia, pronounced [sosjeˈðað siˈβil de kombiˈβensja]; Yucatec Maya: láak’ bix múul kuxtalil, pronounced [láːkʔ biʃ múːl kuʃtaˈlil]). The bill was passed unanimously by the Congress of Campeche on 20 December 2013 and, while it applies to both same-sex and opposite-sex couples, it does not provide couples with the same rights, benefits and obligations as marriage. A notable distinction is that civil unions are not registered with the civil registry but rather with the Public Registry of Property and Commerce (Registro Público de la Propiedad y de Comercio).

On 11 August 2015, the Supreme Court of Justice of the Nation ruled in a 9–1 decision that Campeche's ban on same-sex couples adopting children was unconstitutional. The court struck down article 19 of the civil union law, which had outlawed adoption by same-sex partners, and set a constitutional precedent that all similar bans in Mexico were unconstitutional. Children's rights were cited as the main reason for the court decision. President of the Supreme Court Luis María Aguilar Morales wrote that "[he] [saw] no problem for a child to be adopted in a society of co-existence, which has precisely this purpose. Are we going to prefer to have children in the streets, which according to statistics exceed 100,000? We attend, of course, and perhaps with the same intensity or more, to the interests of the child." On 23 September 2016, the Supreme Court finalised the ruling in the adoption case against Campeche and issued a nationwide jurisprudence which binds all lower court judges to rule in favor of same-sex couples seeking adoption and parental rights. Campeche's ban on same-sex adoption was lifted on 26 September.

== Same-sex marriage ==
Same-sex marriage in Mexico

=== Passage of legislation in 2016 ===
On 31 March 2014, a lesbian couple, María Estrada Muñoz and Faride Cabrera Can, applied for a marriage license in San Francisco de Campeche. Officials rejected their application on the basis that same-sex couples could only enter into civil unions and could not legally marry. The Supreme Court held oral arguments, and declared the ban on same-sex marriages unconstitutional in July 2014. It permitted the plaintiff couple to marry and ordered Congress to modify the Civil Code to allow same-sex marriages. The conservative National Action Party (PAN) said it would abide by the ruling. The couple married on 30 August 2014. In September 2014, the PRD announced that eight same-sex couples, five from San Francisco de Campeche and three from Ciudad del Carmen, had sought amparos granting them the right to marry. It added that analysis of changing the marriage statutes was in progress.

On 4 April 2016, Governor Alejandro Moreno Cárdenas submitted a same-sex marriage bill to the Congress of Campeche. Shortly thereafter, the two largest parties in the state, the Institutional Revolutionary Party (PRI) and the National Action Party, announced their support for the bill. Deputies said the bill would likely be voted on sometime in May 2016. On 10 May, Congress voted 34–1 to approve the same-sex marriage bill. It was published in the official state gazette on 16 May and came into effect on 20 May.

10 May 2016 vote in the Congress
Party	Voted for	Voted against	Abstained	Absent (Did not vote)
Institutional Revolutionary Party	15: Pablo Angulo Briceño; Javier Barrera Pacheco; Laura Baqueiro Ramos; Ángela Cámara Damas; Ernesto Castillo Rosado; Ana Crisanty Villarino; Juan Damián Vera; Leticia Enríquez Cachón; Fredy Martínez Quijano; Ramón Méndez Lanz; Alejandrina Moreno Barona; Marina Sánchez Rodríguez; Julio Sansores Sansores; Guadalupe Tejocote González; Edda Uuh Xool	–	–	–
National Action Party	11: Rosario Baqueiro Acosta; María Caballero May; Janini Casanova Garcí; Aurora Ceh Reyna; Silverio Cruz Quevedo; Eliseo Fernández Montúfar; Rosario Gamboa Castillo; Ileana Herrera Pérez; Jaime Muñoz Morfín; Sandra Sánchez Díaz; Carlos Sosa Pacheco	–	–	–
Ecologist Green Party of Mexico	3: Martha Albores Avendaño; Manuel Ortega Lliteras; Luis Peralta May	–	–	–
National Regeneration Movement	2: Andrea Martínez Aguilar; Carlos Martínez Aké	1: Adriana Áviles Áviles	–	–
New Alliance Party	2: José Guzmán Chí; Elia Ocaña Hernández	–	–	–
Party of the Democratic Revolution	1: María Pérez López	–	–	–
Total	34	1	0	0
Total	97.1%	2.9%	0.0%	0.0%

Article 157 of the Civil Code was amended to read: Marriage is the union of two people who live a shared life, in which both partners must ensure mutual respect, equality, and support. Marriage is contracted by the authorities of the Civil Registry as set out in this Code and in accordance with the formalities it requires. (Note: Spanish: Establece que el matrimonio es la unión de dos personas para llevar una vida en común, en donde ambas se deben procurar respeto, igualdad y ayuda mutua. Debe celebrarse ante las autoridades del Registro Civil tal y como lo establece este Código y con las formalidades que éste exige.) In June 2016, Adriana Áviles Áviles was expelled from her party, the National Regeneration Movement (MORENA), over her decision to vote against the legislation. On 14 June, opponents of same-sex marriage filed an injunction against the new law, arguing that "it was unfairly imposed on Campechanos", and refuted allegations of homophobia. On 7 July, a federal judge ruled in favor of a stay. A spokesperson for Congress said the judge's injunction only bars the plaintiffs from marrying a partner of the same sex. According to the President of Congress, Ramón Méndez Lanz, same-sex couples can continue to marry in the state.

=== Native Mexicans ===
While many Indigenous cultures historically practiced polygamy to some extent, there are no records of same-sex marriages being performed in these cultures in the way they are commonly defined in Western legal systems. However, many Indigenous communities recognize identities and relationships that may be placed on the LGBT spectrum. The Yucatec Maya recognized certain forms of institutionalised same-sex relations. Some shamans engaged in homosexual acts with their patients, and priests engaged in ritualized homosexual acts with their gods. Anthropologist Walter Lee Williams wrote with respect to the Yucatec Maya: "After my arrival in Yucatán, I soon learned that the society provides a de facto acceptance of same-sex relations for males. It did not take long to establish contacts, and my informants suggested that a large majority of the male population is at certain times sexually active with other males. This usually occurs in the years between thirteen and thirty, when sexual desire is strongest, but it also involves men older than that. Marriage to a woman does not seem to have much effect on the occurrence and amount of homosexual behavior." Carvings, rituals and stories were explicit about sexual diversity.

=== Statistics ===
The following table shows the number of same-sex marriages performed in Campeche since legalization in 2016 as reported by the National Institute of Statistics and Geography. Figures for 2020 are lower than previous years because of the restrictions in place due to the COVID-19 pandemic.

Number of marriages performed in Campeche
Year	Same-sex			Opposite-sex	Total	% same-sex
Year	Female	Male	Total	Opposite-sex	Total	% same-sex
2016	10	6	16	4,505	4,521	0.35%
2017	15	10	25	4,310	4,335	0.58%
2018	19	13	32	4,366	4,398	0.73%
2019	22	13	35	4,575	4,610	0.76%
2020	13	11	24	2,959	2,983	0.80%
2021	43	23	66	4,866	4,932	1.33%
2022	44	19	63	4,703	4,766	1.32%
2023	46	32	78	4,897	4,975	1.57%
2024	36	13	59	4,517	4,566	1.29%
2025	42	21	63	4,455	4,518	1.39%

== Public opinion ==
A 2017 opinion poll conducted by the Strategic Communication Office (Gabinete de Comunicación Estratégica) found that 42% of Campeche residents supported same-sex marriage, one of the lowest in the nation, while 55% were opposed. According to a 2018 survey by the National Institute of Statistics and Geography, 56% of the Campeche public opposed same-sex marriage, the third highest in Mexico after Chiapas (59%) and Tabasco (56.5%).

== See also ==
- Same-sex marriage in Mexico
- LGBT rights in Mexico
