= Lizama =

Lizama is a surname. Notable people with the surname include:

- Augustin Lizama (born 1979/1980), one of the murderers of Stephanie Kuhen
- Claudio Lizama (born 1973), Chilean footballer
- Rosa Adriana Díaz Lizama (born 1973), Mexican politician
