= Same-sex marriage in Tlaxcala =

Same-sex marriage has been legal in Tlaxcala since 25 December 2020. Legislation to legalise same-sex marriage passed the Congress of Tlaxcala on 8 December 2020 by a vote of 16–3, and came into force on 25 December following Governor Marco Antonio Mena Rodríguez's signature. Tlaxcala was the nineteenth Mexican state to open marriage to same-sex couples. The state has also recognised civil unions, which grant several of the rights and benefits of marriage, for both opposite-sex and same-sex couples since 12 January 2017.

== Civil unions ==
In February 2014, Deputy Eréndira Montiel Jiménez from the Party of the Democratic Revolution (PRD) promised to introduce a partnership bill to the Congress of Tlaxcala. The proposed legislation, introduced on 3 April 2014, outlined the legal framework for a form of coexistence "that [had] the purpose of marriage or concubinage". On 29 December 2016, Congress approved the coexistence bill by 18 votes to 4. Two deputies from the National Action Party (PAN) walked out in protest as the voting took place. The bill established an institution called "solidarity cohabitation partnership" (Spanish: sociedad de convivencia solidaria, pronounced [sosjeˈðað de kombiˈβensja soliˈdaɾja]), which provides cohabiting same-sex and opposite-sex couples with many of the rights and obligations of marriage. The law was published in the official state journal on 11 January 2017, following Governor Marco Antonio Mena Rodríguez's signature, and took effect the following day.

== Same-sex marriage ==
=== Background ===
The Supreme Court of Justice of the Nation ruled on 12 June 2015 that state bans on same-sex marriage are unconstitutional nationwide. The court's ruling is considered a "jurisprudential thesis" and did not invalidate state laws, meaning that same-sex couples denied the right to marry would still have to seek individual amparos in court. The ruling standardized the procedures for judges and courts throughout Mexico to approve all applications for same-sex marriages and made the approval mandatory. Specifically, the court ruled that bans on same-sex marriage violate Articles 1 and 4 of the Constitution of Mexico. Article 1 of the Constitution states:

Any form of discrimination, based on ethnic or national origin, gender, age, disabilities, social status, medical conditions, religion, opinions, sexual orientation, marital status, or any other form, which violates the human dignity or seeks to annul or diminish the rights and freedoms of the people, is prohibited. (Note: In some official and indigenous languages of Tlaxcala: Spanish: Queda prohibida toda discriminación motivada por origen étnico o nacional, el género, la edad, las discapacidades, la condición social, las condiciones de salud, la religión, las opiniones, las preferencias sexuales, el estado civil o cualquier otra que atente contra la dignidad humana y tenga por objeto anular o menoscabar los derechos y libertades de las personas.; Nahuatl: Majmauilo nochi tlaixpinaualistli ika maseualtsitsi katli euani tomexkotlali, siuatl uan tlakatl, ininxiui, uan katli amo ueli motekipanolia, maseualmej, melauatlajkayotl, teotlanejnewili, tlatsintokilistli, kualtiloni pakilistli, sanimanyotl nemili o akinijki kichiuas tlaixpanoli ika maseual tlaixpinauali uan kipia tamantli tlaixkotonali o tlaijtlakoli tlen tlamelaualistli uan tlamakixtiistli ika maseualmej.; Otomi: Hingi tsa da t’utsa ya jä’i num’u ngu ra mengu ka ya hnini hñätho, ne ha ra ñ’oho ua ra m’ehñä, ra jeya gä mets’i, ha nxotho ra jä’i, hä ua hin’ä bojä, ha hingi dathi, ne te ma nijä pa, xa nthäti ua hin’ä ne ha ua ma n’a ngu embi t’uni ra m’ui gä mu’i di thegi di mu’i ra n’yo ya jä’i.)

In late June 2015, fifteen same-sex couples applied for marriage licenses at the civil registry office in Tlaxcala, but all were rejected. With the help of the State Human Rights Commission, they filed individual amparos in court. On 27 November 2015, a federal court granted an amparo to one of the couples. Their marriage, which was the first same-sex marriage in Tlaxcala, took place on 18 January 2016 in Ixtenco. The amparo was only granted after the Commission had interceded on their behalf.

=== Legislative action ===
A bill to legalize same-sex marriage was first presented to the Congress of Tlaxcala on 2 October 2009. The proposal was blocked by state lawmakers in 2010, and the state, along with officials from Guanajuato, Jalisco, Morelos and Sonora, later filed a formal court challenge to the passage of a same-sex marriage law in Mexico City. In June 2011, activists questioned why no action had been taken on the bill and were told that it was still "climbing the roster". Deputy María Stankiewicz Ramírez from the Institutional Revolutionary Party (PRI) announced that a same-sex marriage bill would be debated in a Congress committee sometime in July 2016, though no vote happened. On 13 October 2017, the New Alliance Party introduced a new bill to Congress.

The July 2018 elections resulted in the National Regeneration Movement (MORENA) and the Labor Party (PT), which support the legalization of same-sex marriage, winning the majority of legislative seats in Congress. In October 2018, Deputy Miguel Covarrubias Cervantes from the Party of the Democratic Revolution introduced a same-sex marriage bill to Congress. The legislation was approved by a 16–3 vote on 8 December 2020. It was published in the official state journal on 24 December, following the signature of Governor Mena Rodríguez, and took effect the following day. The law amended article 42 of the Civil Code to read: Marriage is the union of two persons with their full consent, whose purpose is to establish a shared life, in which both partners provide each other with respect, equality, and mutual support. It must be entered into before the officials designated by law and with all the formalities required by it. (Note: Spanish: El matrimonio es la unión de dos personas con su pleno consentimiento, que tiene como objeto realizar la comunidad de vida, en donde ambas se procuran respeto, igualdad y ayuda mutua. Debe celebrarse ante los funcionarios que establece la ley y con todas las solemnidades que ella exige.)

6 December 2020 vote in the Congress
Party	Voted for	Voted against	Abstained	Absent (Did not vote)
National Regeneration Movement	8: Víctor Báez López; Patricia Jaramillo García; María Mastranzo Corona; José Méndez Salgado; María Netzahuatl Ilhuicatzi; Javier Ortega Blancas; Jesús Pérez Saavedra; Mayra Vázquez Velázquez	–	–	4: Víctor Castro López; María Montiel Cerón; Miguel Piedras Díaz; Ramiro Vivanco Chedraui
Labor Party	2: Michaelle Brito Vázquez; Irma Garay Loredo	–	–	1: María Pluma Flores
National Action Party	1: Leticia Hernández Pérez	1: Omar López Avendaño	–	–
Party of the Democratic Revolution	2: Miguel Covarrubias Cervantes; Laura Flores Lozano	–	–	–
Social Encounter Party	–	2: José Garrido Cruz; Luz Vera Díaz	–	–
Citizens' Movement	1: María Casas Meneses	–	–	–
Ecologist Green Party of Mexico	–	–	–	1: Maribel León Cruz
Institutional Revolutionary Party	1: Zonia Montiel Candaneda	–	–	–
New Alliance Party	1: Luz Mata Lara	–	–	–
Total	16	3	0	6
Total	64.0%	12.0%	0.0%	24.0%

=== Statistics ===
The following table shows the number of same-sex marriages performed in Tlaxcala since 2021 as reported by the National Institute of Statistics and Geography.

Number of marriages performed in Tlaxcala
Year	Same-sex			Opposite-sex	Total	% same-sex
Year	Female	Male	Total	Opposite-sex	Total	% same-sex
2021	16	6	22	3,318	3,340	0.66%
2022	22	12	34	3,740	3,774	0.90%
2023	14	19	33	3,773	3,806	0.87%
2024	16	19	35	3,330	3,365	1.04%

== Public opinion ==
A 2017 opinion poll conducted by the Strategic Communication Office (Gabinete de Comunicación Estratégica) found that 51% of Tlaxcala residents supported same-sex marriage, while 48% were opposed. According to a 2018 survey by the National Institute of Statistics and Geography, 44% of the Tlaxcala public opposed same-sex marriage.

== See also ==
- Same-sex marriage in Mexico
- LGBT rights in Mexico
