= Same-sex marriage in Sonora =

Same-sex marriage has been legal in Sonora since 22 October 2021. On 23 September 2021, the Congress of Sonora voted 25–8 to pass a law legalizing same-sex marriage. The legislation was published in the state's official gazette on 21 October, and took effect the following day. Sonora was the 21st Mexican state to open marriage to same-sex couples.

Previously, same-sex couples could briefly marry in Sonora between 11 May and 18 May 2016. On 11 May, the civil registry announced that same-sex couples could receive marriage licenses without having to file an amparo in court. However, Governor Claudia Pavlovich Arellano ordered a stop to this directive on 18 May.

== Legal history ==
=== Background ===
An important recognition case was filed in 2013. A male same-sex couple, who had married in Mexico City in July 2012, returned to Sonora and attempted to enroll as a couple in the Institute for Social Security and Services for State Workers of Sonora, a social security program. They were denied admittance on 8 October 2012 and filed an amparo with a court in Culiacán, Sinaloa. On 9 October 2013, the court granted the amparo, ruling that the human right to form a family without discrimination had been violated.

In early May 2014, a lesbian couple was denied a marriage license in the municipality of San Luis Río Colorado. On 26 May 2014, they filed an amparo in the Fifth District Court of the Fifteenth Circuit in Mexicali, Baja California. A hearing was held on 17 September 2014, and the couple received a favorable ruling on 22 October 2014. Their wedding was scheduled to take place at the civil registry office in the small town of Luis B. Sanchez on 13 February 2015, but was held in a private home with the consent and participation of registry officials. Their wedding was the first same-sex marriage in Sonora. A second lesbian couple applied for a marriage license on 11 August 2014. Similarly to the previous couple, they were denied a license by civil registry officials and filed an amparo in court. The amparo was granted in February 2015.

On 12 June 2015, the Supreme Court of Justice of the Nation ruled that state bans on same-sex marriage are unconstitutional nationwide. The court's ruling is considered a "jurisprudential thesis" and did not invalidate state laws, meaning that same-sex couples denied the right to marry would still have to seek individual amparos in court. The ruling standardized the procedures for judges and courts throughout Mexico to approve all applications for same-sex marriages and made the approval mandatory. The court based its decision on Article 4 of the Constitution of Mexico, which respects matrimonial equality: "Man and woman are equal under the law. The law shall protect the organization and development of the family". (Note: In Spanish: El varón y la mujer son iguales ante la ley. Esta protegerá la organización y el desarrollo de la familia. In Mayo: Öw ento jamut leeytaw bicham nanancha bexre. Am suayanakeentok naw aanim anianake. In Yaqui: O’outa into jamuttat ju lei lutu’uria nanancha am eiya. Ini juka pamiliata emo nakeka a yo’oturiawamta ania. In Oʼodham: ‘ɨgai kɨlɨ kechi ‘ɨgai okaxi an nukado ‘ɨpa ‘ɨma’axi amai tɨ’iyaga ichi nukda kechi gɨ’ɨli o’obhara tama. In Seri: Ziix quiisax quih ctam xah, cmaam xah, hapaspoj caaixaj icaaitom quih iti hant yaii quih ziix tazo pte yamiisot iha. Ziix quih oaanloj xah, ziix quih iic cöisiipt ha quih chaa tintica poco tax iicp ano cösinol aha.) Emboldened by the Supreme Court ruling, same-sex couples from across the state filed amparos for the right to marry. By 1 September 2016, 26 same-sex couples had sought an amparo in Sonora, with all of them being granted by the courts.

=== Legislative action ===
A bill to legalize same-sex marriage was introduced to the Congress of Sonora by former Labor Party candidate for governor, Miguel Angel Haro Moren, in January 2010. The proposal was rejected in February 2010, and the state later filed an unsuccessful constitutional challenge against recognizing Mexico City same-sex marriages in Sonora.

On 2 August 2021, Judge Antonio Mora from the Thirteenth Federal District Court ordered Congress to pass a same-sex marriage law by December 2021. Mora wrote in his ruling that the inaction of the Sonora Congress "perpetuate the notion that same-sex couples are less deserving of recognition than heterosexual couples, thereby offending their human dignity and integrity." The court ordered changes to article 2 of the Family Code, which defined the family as being based on the "matrimonial union or concubinage of a man and a woman", article 11, which defined marriage as "the legitimate union of a man and a woman", and article 102, which explicitly banned marriages between people of the same sex. On 23 September 2021, the Congress of Sonora approved a same-sex marriage bill introduced by deputies Ivanna Celeste Taddei Arriola and Rosa Elena Trijullo, in a 25–8 vote. The bill was supported by most deputies from the National Regeneration Movement, the Institutional Revolutionary Party, the Labor Party and other smaller parties, but opposed by the conservative National Action Party. The law was published in the state's official gazette on 21 October, without newly-elected Governor Alfonso Durazo's signature, and took effect the following day, 22 October 2021.

The law ensures that married same-sex couples enjoy the same rights, benefits and responsibilities as married opposite-sex couples, including tax benefits, immigration rights, property rights, inheritance, etc. The first same-sex marriage performed under the new law was conducted in Hermosillo between Héctor Huerta and Carlos Silva on 22 October.

Article 11 of the Family Code of Sonora was amended to read as follows:

- in Spanish: El matrimonio es una institución de carácter público e interés social; es la unión legítima de dos personas, con el propósito expreso de integrar una familia, el respeto recíproco y la protección mutua. Cualquier disposición contraria a estos fines, acordada por los cónyuges, se tendrá por no puesta.
- (Marriage is a public and social institution; it is the legitimate union of two people, with the express purpose of integrating a family, reciprocal respect and mutual protection. Any provision contrary to these purposes, agreed to by the spouses, shall be deemed not established.)

Political party	Members	Yes	No	Abstain
National Regeneration Movement	14	12	2	
Institutional Revolutionary Party	4	3	1	
National Action Party	4		4	
Labor Party	3	2	1	
New Alliance Party	2	2		
Ecologist Green Party of Mexico	2	2		
Citizens' Movement	2	2		
Party of the Democratic Revolution	1	1		
Social Encounter Party	1	1		
Total	33	25	8	0

=== Brief legalization in May 2016 ===
On 11 May 2016, the director of the civil registry, Martha Julissa Bojórquez Castillo, announced that same-sex couples could begin marrying in the state without the need to file an amparo in court. She justified this by stating that more than 12 amparos had been granted to same-sex couples in Sonora, but under Mexican law, only 5 such amparos are necessary to make the state's offending provisions in the Family Code null and inoperable.

The move caused immediate backlash from conservative and evangelical groups. The civil registrar of Navojoa announced he would not comply with the decision. Several deputies from across the political spectrum, however, expressed their support for the decision and called for explicit amendments to the Family Code. On 18 May 2016, Governor Claudia Pavlovich Arellano ordered all civil registrars in the state to stop marrying same-sex couples, arguing that the Family Code of Sonora prohibited same-sex marriages and that the state would continue to abide by those laws, even though the articles in the Family Code banning same-sex marriage had already been declared inoperable and unconstitutional.

== Native Mexicans ==
Some Native Mexican peoples have traditions of two-spirit individuals who filed the role of a third gender. The Pima people call them ʼuvïkvaḍ (pronounced [ˈʔuvɨkvaɖ]; plural: ʼuʼuikvaḍ). Pima two-spirit individuals did not cross-dress but "act[ed], talk[ed], and express[ed] themselves like members of the opposite sex, showing an interest in duties and work of the other sex, and a marked preference for their companionship." According to Pima mythology, "many years ago it happened that in the Pima country there was a shortage of materials for making bows and arrows. They sent word to the Pagago. The Papago cut wood for bows and arrow-weed for arrow shafts. They also collected feathers and sinew. They put these materials in two net carrying frames. Two Papago boys placed these women's carrying devices on their backs and brought the materials to the Pima. When the boys returned home they became berdaches." It is likely that they were able to marry men. If so, this would have allowed for marriages between two biological males to be performed in the tribe.

Modern terms for a gay or lesbian person include cocpémetx (pronounced [kokˈpɛːmːɛːtχ]) in the Seri language and sebe (pronounced [ˈseβe]) in the Yaqui language, but it is not believed that they occupied a similar cultural role as the Pima ʼuvïkvaḍ.

== Marriage statistics ==
Two women married in Nogales on 5 April 2017, making them the first same-sex couple to marry in the city. A second same-sex marriage occurred in the same city later that same month. The first same-sex marriage in Guaymas was performed on 8 April 2017. By June 2017, 23 same-sex marriages had been performed in the state; 15 in Hermosillo and the remainder in Nogales, Guaymas, San Luis Río Colorado and Puerto Peñasco. 32 same-sex couples married in the state between May 2015 and November 2017.

The following table shows the number of same-sex marriages performed in Sonora since 2021 as reported by the National Institute of Statistics and Geography.

Number of marriages performed in Sonora
Year	Same-sex			Opposite-sex	Total	% same-sex
Year	Female	Male	Total	Opposite-sex	Total	% same-sex
2021	61	26	97	14,184	14,271	0.68%

== Public opinion ==
A 2017 opinion poll conducted by Gabinete de Comunicación Estratégica found that 50% of Sonora residents supported same-sex marriage, while 46% were opposed.

According to a 2018 survey by the National Institute of Statistics and Geography, 31% of the Sonora public opposed same-sex marriage, the third lowest in all of Mexico behind Baja California (31%) and Mexico City (29%)

== See also ==
- Same-sex marriage in Mexico
- LGBT rights in Mexico
