= Same-sex marriage in Tabasco =

Same-sex marriage has been legal in Tabasco since 27 October 2022. A bill to legalise same-sex marriage was passed 23–5 by the Congress of Tabasco on 19 October 2022, with support from the governing National Regeneration Movement and the Ecologist Green Party of Mexico, and signed by Governor Carlos Manuel Merino Campos. It was published in the official state journal on 26 October and took effect the next day. Tabasco was the 28th Mexican state to legalize same-sex marriage. Previously, same-sex couples were only able to marry in Tabasco, and in the rest of Mexico, through the judicial recurso de amparo remedy. The first same-sex marriage in Tabasco occurred in Villahermosa in February 2015. In June 2015, the Supreme Court of Justice of the Nation ruled that the Constitution of Mexico guarantees same-sex couples the right to marry and standardized the procedures for courts to approve applications for same-sex marriages through the amparo remedy.

== Legal history ==
=== Background ===
The Supreme Court of Justice of the Nation ruled on 12 June 2015 that state bans on same-sex marriage are unconstitutional nationwide. The court's ruling is considered a "jurisprudential thesis" and did not invalidate state laws, meaning that same-sex couples denied the right to marry would still have to seek individual amparos in court. The ruling standardized the procedures for judges and courts throughout Mexico to approve all applications for same-sex marriages and made the approval mandatory. Specifically, the court ruled that bans on same-sex marriage violate Articles 1 and 4 of the Constitution of Mexico (Spanish: Constitución Política; Chontal Maya: Tuslomjɨpom Politika). Article 1 of the Constitution states:

Any form of discrimination, based on ethnic or national origin, gender, age, disabilities, social status, medical conditions, religion, opinions, sexual orientation, marital status, or any other form, which violates the human dignity or seeks to annul or diminish the rights and freedoms of the people, is prohibited. (Note: In some official and indigenous languages of Tabasco: Spanish: Queda prohibida toda discriminación motivada por origen étnico o nacional, el género, la edad, las discapacidades, la condición social, las condiciones de salud, la religión, las opiniones, las preferencias sexuales, el estado civil o cualquier otra que atente contra la dignidad humana y tenga por objeto anular o menoscabar los derechos y libertades de las personas.; Chontal Maya: Mach uts u chenob buya uka’a yok lotla uk’a aj yokot’anob, a kaxtran t’ano’, uk’a ixik i ujap, uk’a mach yuwi, o k’ojo o uk’a mach’an u t’akin, aj ko’panob, uk’a u k’ote tan ch’uj o uk’a yoltak winik i ixik, i uk’a mach loto’ i k’ua chichka, ukɨ uchen loxtima tuba upasik kɨ lotla bajka mɨkɨ.)

On 18 February 2015, a local newspaper announced that the first same-sex marriage in Tabasco had occurred in Villahermosa on 13 February. The couple had received an amparo granting them the right to marry. By May 2017, ten same-sex marriages had been carried out through the recurso de amparo remedy.

=== Passage of legislation in 2022 ===
Same-sex marriage in Mexico

Debate surrounding the legalization of same-sex marriage and civil unions first emerged in Tabasco in 2009, simultaneously with the discussion then-ongoing in Mexico City. Following the passage of legislation legalizing same-sex marriage in Mexico City in December 2009, debate gained traction in Tabasco. In 2009, a group of twenty same-sex couples sent a motion to the Congress of Tabasco asking that they be allowed to marry. The state's largest political parties, the Institutional Revolutionary Party (PRI) and the Party of the Democratic Revolution (PRD), announced their support for same-sex marriage in 2010. Nonetheless, there was little legislative will to change the marriage statutes. As a result, a popular initiative to reform article 154 of the Civil Code to legalize same-sex marriage was presented by the LGBT organization Tabasqueños United for Diversity and Sexual Health (Tudyssex; Tabasqueños Unidos por la Diversidad y la Salud Sexual) in April 2014, but it stalled in Congress. The Party of the Democratic Revolution submitted another same-sex marriage bill on 3 July 2015. On 18 May 2016, a deputy said there was majority support for the bill in Congress, but eventually no vote happened. The July 2018 elections resulted in the National Regeneration Movement (MORENA), which supports the legalization of same-sex marriage, winning the governorship and the majority of legislative seats in Congress. In November 2021, Tudyssex criticised the legislative inaction, with reports that MORENA was reluctant to pass same-sex marriage legislation due to opposition from conservative groups. In April 2022, activists said they were working with MORENA deputies to introduce a bill legalizing same-sex marriage.

A same-sex marriage bill was introduced to Congress on 12 October 2022 by Deputy José Hernández Díaz. It was approved by a Congress committee on 17 October with 4 votes in favour and 2 abstentions, and a final vote was scheduled for Wednesday, 19 October. Congress passed the bill on 19 October by 23 votes to 5 with 7 abstentions. Deputy Emilio Contreras Martínez de Escobar, a supporter of the legislation, said that "[i]t [was] necessary that, as representatives of society, we listen and represent society through this type of legislative actions". Opponents of the legislation organised prayer rallies outside the Congress building. The law was signed by Governor Carlos Manuel Merino Campos, and published in the official state journal on 26 October. It took effect the next day. Article 154 of the Civil Code was amended to read: Marriage is the free union of two people, over eighteen years of age, regardless of gender, to form a shared life in which both provide each other with respect, equality, and mutual support. (Note: Spanish: El matrimonio, es la unión libre de dos personas, mayores dieciocho años de edad, indistintamente del género, para realizar la comunidad de vida, en donde ambos se procuran respeto, igualdad y ayuda mutua.)

19 October 2022 vote in the Congress
Party	Voted for	Voted against	Abstained	Absent (Did not vote)
National Regeneration Movement	18: Euclides Alejandro Alejandro; Rosana Arcia Félix; Laura Ávalos Magaña; Jorge Bracamonte Hernández; Emilio Contreras Martínez de Escobar; David Coutiño Méndez; Rita Gálvez Bonora; Karla Garrido Perea; José Hernández Díaz; Jaime Lastra Bastar; Dariana Lemarroy de la Fuente; Marlene Martínez Ruíz; María Morales López; Ana Núñez de Dios; Jesús Ochoa Hernández; Isabel Orueta Hernández; Diana Rodríguez Morales; Rafael Sánchez Cabrales	–	3: David Gómez Cerino; Jesús Selván García; Dolores Zubieta Ruiz	–
Party of the Democratic Revolution	–	3: Juan Álvarez Carrillo; José Flores Morales; Beatriz Vasconcelos Pérez	3: Shirley Herrera Dagdug; Héctor Peralta Grappin; Joandra Rodríguez Pérez	–
Institutional Revolutionary Party	2: Martiza Jiménez Pérez; Katia Ornelas Gil	2: Fabián Granier Calles; Héctor Peralta Grappin	–	–
Ecologist Green Party of Mexico	3: Norma Aranguren Rosique; Miguel Moheno Piñera; Miguel Vélez Mier y Concha	–	–	–
Citizens' Movement	–	–	1: Casilda Ruíz Agustín	–
Total	23	5	7	0
Total	65.7%	14.3%	20.0%	0.0%

== Marriage statistics ==
The following table shows the number of same-sex marriages performed in Tabasco since legalization in 2022 as reported by the National Institute of Statistics and Geography.

Number of marriages performed in Tabasco
Year	Same-sex			Opposite-sex	Total	% same-sex
Year	Female	Male	Total	Opposite-sex	Total	% same-sex
2022	20	7	27	13,345	13,372	0.20%
2023	109	44	153	12,859	13,012	1.18%
2024	73	45	118	12,431	12,549	0.94%
2025	46	32	78	10,152	10,230	0.76%

== Public opinion ==
According to a 2018 survey by the National Institute of Statistics and Geography, 56.5% of the Tabasco public opposed same-sex marriage, the second highest in Mexico after the neighboring state of Chiapas at 59%.

== See also ==
- Same-sex marriage in Mexico
- LGBT rights in Mexico
