= List of Mexican state congresses =

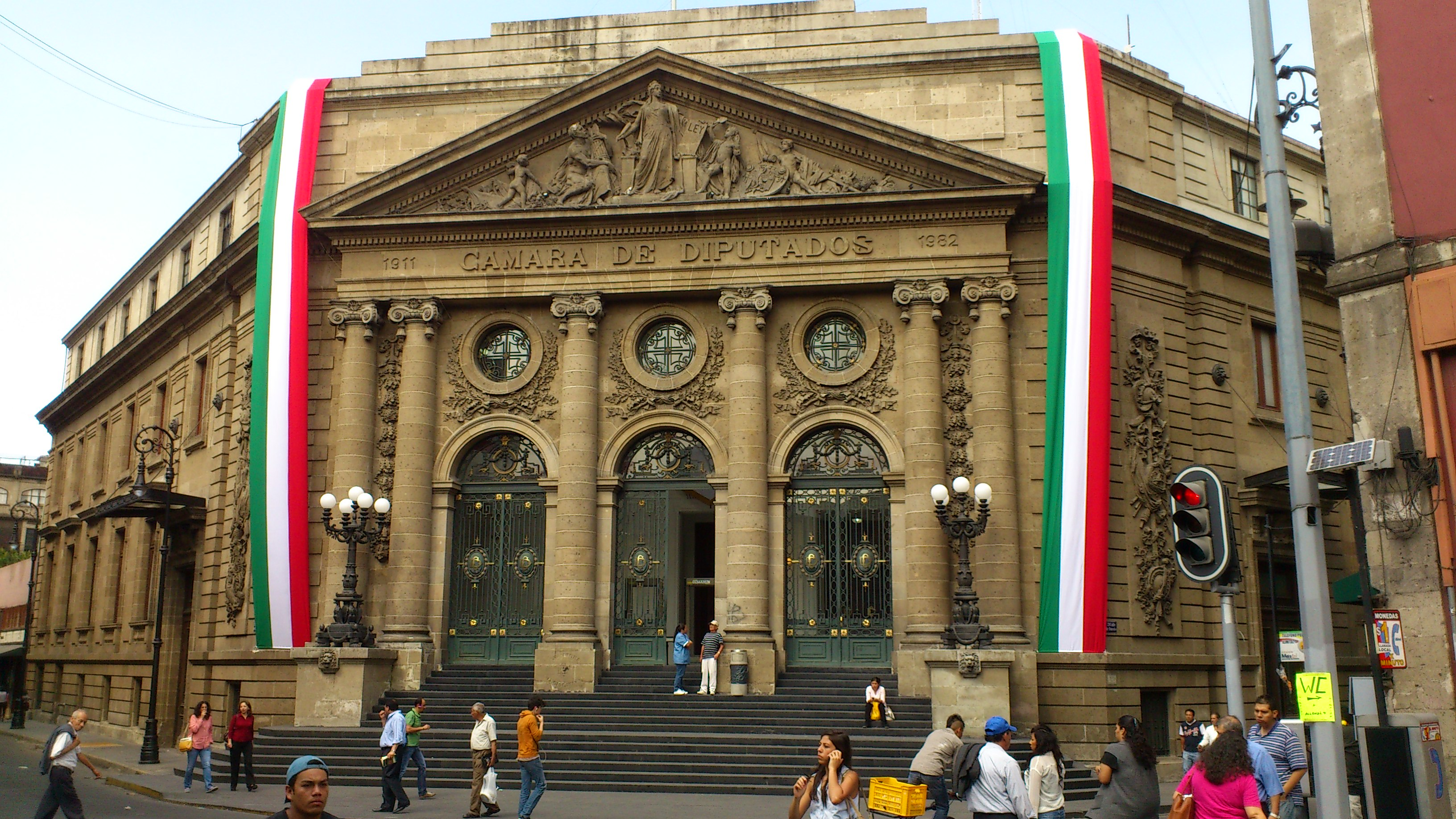
Donceles Legislative Palace, seat of the Congress of Mexico City, the youngest local congress of all (created on September 17, 2018).

The congresses of the federal entities of Mexico are the depositary bodies of the legislative power in the thirty-one states and Mexico City. Conformed as unicameral assemblies, they are composed of deputies elected under the principles of relative majority and by proportional representation, in accordance with the specific regulations of local laws, but following the general bases of the federal constitution. All states, including Mexico City, use the presidential system form of government.

Its members are elected by universal vote under the two principles already mentioned; the former directly and the others according to the multi-member list system established by federal law. The term of office is three years with the option of immediate reelection, as long as it is representing the party or coalition that originally nominated the deputy.

For each titular deputy, an alternate is elected; This being the one who will make up for the temporary or permanent absences of his running mate. Its characteristics and general bases are supported by section II of article 116 of the Political Constitution of the United Mexican States.

The legislative powers and capacities of these institutions are framed in those policies in which the states are autonomous (internal regime, budget, income, social development, public security, prosecution and administration of justice) that are not contemplated in the federal order and that are not exclusively awarded to the Congress of the Union, so that each state has their own legislature whereby laws affecting the state are made.

== List of congresses ==
Congress	Deputies			Creation date
Congress	FPTP	PR	Total	Creation date
Congress of Aguascalientes	18 (67%)	9 (33%)	27	November 8, 1846
Congress of Baja California	17 (68%)	8 (32%)	25	November 30, 1953
Congress of Baja California Sur	16 (76%)	5 (24%)	21	November 25, 1974
Congress of Campeche	21 (60%)	14 (40%)	35	March 2, 1861
Congress of Chiapas	24 (60%)	16 (40%)	40	January 5, 1865
Congress of Chihuahua	22 (67%)	11 (33%)	33	September 4, 1823
Congress of Mexico City	33 (50%)	33 (50%)	66	September 17, 2018
Congress of Coahuila	16 (64%)	9 (36%)	25	August 15, 1824
Congress of Colima	16 (64%)	9 (36%)	25	July 19, 1857
Congress of Durango	15 (60%)	10 (40%)	25	July 20, 1827
Congress of Guanajuato	22 (61%)	14 (39%)	36	March 25, 1824
Congress of Guerrero	28 (61%)	18 (39%)	46	January 30, 1850
Congress of Hidalgo	18 (60%)	12 (40%)	30	May 16, 1869
Congress of Jalisco	20 (53%)	18 (47%)	38	September 8, 1823
Congress of the State of Mexico	45 (60%)	30 (40%)	75	March 2, 1824
Congress of Michoacán	24 (60%)	16 (40%)	40	April 6, 1824
Congress of Morelos	12 (60%)	8 (40%)	20	July 28, 1869
Congress of Nayarit	18 (60%)	12 (40%)	30	December 25, 1917
Congress of Nuevo León	26 (62%)	16 (38%)	42	August 1, 1824
Congress of Oaxaca	25 (60%)	17 (40%)	42	July 1, 1823
Congress of Puebla	26 (63%)	15 (37%)	41	March 19, 1824
Legislature of Querétaro	15 (60%)	10 (40%)	25	February 12, 1824
Congress of Quintana Roo	15 (60%)	10 (40%)	25	November 25, 1974
Congress of San Luis Potosí	15 (56%)	12 (44%)	27	April 21, 1824
Congress of Sinaloa	24 (60%)	16 (40%)	40	March 13, 1831
Congress of Sonora	21 (64%)	12 (36%)	33	September 19, 1824
Congress of Tabasco	21 (60%)	14 (40%)	35	May 3, 1824
Congress of Tamaulipas	22 (61%)	14 (39%)	36	May 7, 1824
Congress of Tlaxcala	15 (60%)	10 (40%)	25	June 1, 1857
Congress of Veracruz	30 (60%)	20 (40%)	50	May 9, 1824
Congress of Yucatán	21 (60%)	14 (40%)	35	August 20, 1823
Congress of Zacatecas	18 (60%)	12 (40%)	30	October 19, 1823
Total	679	444	1123	—

== Composition by political parties ==
Composition of state congresses as of 2025
State	Legislative term								Local parties		Total
State	Legislative term	National Action Party (Mexico)	Institutional Revolutionary Party	Party of the Democratic Revolution	Labor Party (Mexico)	Ecologist Green Party of Mexico	Citizens' Movement (Mexico)	Morena (political party)	Local parties	Independent or no party	Total
Aguascalientes	2024−2027	15	1	2	-	1	1	7	-	–	27
Baja California	2024−2027	3	1	-	1	2	1	14	2	1	25
Baja California Sur	2024−2027	1	1	-	7	1	–	9	2	–	21
Campeche	2024−2027	2	3	-	2	2	10	16	–	-	35
Chiapas	2024−2027	1	3	-	6	9	1	17	3	–	40
Chihuahua	2024−2027	12	4	-	1	1	2	12	-	1	33
Mexico City	2024−2027	15	2	2	4	10	3	24	-	6	66
Coahuila	2024−2026	5	10	2	1	1	-	5	1	–	25
Colima	2024−2027	2	3	-	3	3	2	11	1	-	25
Durango	2024−2027	5	7	-	-	2	1	10	–	–	25
Guanajuato	2024−2027	16	3	1	1	2	2	11	–	-	36
Guerrero	2024−2027	1	6	4	4	6	2	23	-	–	46
Hidalgo	2024−2027	1	2	1	2	2	2	16	4	-	30
Jalisco	2024−2027	5	3	-	2	2	11	9	5	1	38
State of Mexico	2024−2027	7	7	2	9	9	4	36	-	1	75
Michoacán	2024−2027	4	2	3	5	6	2	14	–	4	40
Morelos	2024−2027	4	1	-	2	1	1	10	1	-	20
Nayarit	2024−2027	3	1	-	4	4	–	15	3	-	30
Nuevo León	2024−2027	10	10	1	1	1	9	9	-	1	42
Oaxaca	2024−2027	-	1	-	3	3	1	28	3	3	42
Puebla	2024−2027	5	1	-	6	7	1	17	4	–	41
Querétaro	2024−2027	7	1	-	1	2	2	10	–	2	25
Quintana Roo	2024−2027	2	1	-	3	5	1	13	–	–	25
San Luis Potosí	2024−2027	4	2	-	4	9	1	6	1	-	27
Sinaloa	2024−2027	2	3	-	1	6	2	24	2	–	40
Sonora	2024−2027	1	2	1	4	4	2	11	6	2	33
Tabasco	2024−2027	-	1	4	3	3	3	21	–	–	35
Tamaulipas	2024−2027	7	1	-	1	1	2	24	–	–	36
Tlaxcala	2024−2027	1	1	2	2	3	-	11	5	-	25
Veracruz	2024−2027	4	-	-	2	5	2	34	-	3	50
Yucatán	2024−2027	12	2	-	1	1	2	17	–	-	35
Zacatecas	2024−2027	4	4	3	2	3	2	11	1	-	30
Total	–	161	90	28	88	117	75	495	44	25	1123

Totals by political parties (2025)
Party	Number of state legislators
Morena	495
PAN	161
PVEM	117
PRI	90
PT	88
MC	75
Local parties	44
PRD	28
Independent or no party	25

== See also ==
- List of current state governors in Mexico
- State governments of Mexico
- List of political parties in Mexico
