= Legislature of Querétaro =

State legislature in Mexico

Legislature of the Free and Sovereign State of Querétaro Legislatura del Estado Libre y Soberano de Querétaro
- LXI Legislature

Type
- Type: Unicameral

Leadership
- President: María Georgina Guzmán Álvarez, PVEM
- Vice President: Mauricio Cárdenas Palacios, PAN
- First Secretary: Arturo Maximiliano García Pérez, Morena
- Second Secretary: Luis Gerardo Ángeles Herrera, PAN

Structure
- Seats: 25
- Political groups: Morena (10) PAN (7) Independent (2) MC (2) PVEM (2) PRI (1) PT (1)
- Length of term: 3 years
- Authority: Second Section, Chapter IV of the Constitution of the State of Querétaro

Elections
- Voting system: First-past-the-post for 15 seats through uninominal districts and Proportional representation for 10 seats through a state-wide list
- Last election: June 2, 2024
- Next election: 2027

Website
- legislaturaqueretaro.gob.mx

The Legislature of the Free and Sovereign State of Querétaro (Spanish: Legislatura del Estado Libre y Soberano de Querétaro) is the unicameral legislature of the Mexican State of Querétaro, invested with the State's legislative power. Unlike in other States of Mexico, where the deliberative body is called "Congress" (Spanish: Congreso), Querétaro's Constitution states that the name of the State's deliberative body is "Legislature" (Spanish: Legislatura).

Deputies to the Legislature serve a term of 3 years, renewable three times, serving a maximum of four consecutive periods. The last election was held on June 6, 2021. The Legislature is currently composed of 25 deputies, 15 of which are elected through plurality voting in uninominal districts, while the remaining 10 are elected via proportional representation in a state-wide list.

== See also ==
- List of Mexican state congresses
