= Congress of the State of Mexico =

Congress of the State of Mexico Congreso del Estado de México
- LXII Legislature

Type
- Type: Unicameral

History
- Founded: September 1821

Structure
- Seats: 75
- Political groups: MORENA (39) PVEM (9) PT (8) PRI (7) PAN (6) MC (4) PRD (2)
- Salary: $79,874.60 MXN

Elections
- Voting system: First-past-the-post for 45 electoral district seats and Mixed-member proportional representation for 30 seats
- Last election: 2 June 2024

Meeting place
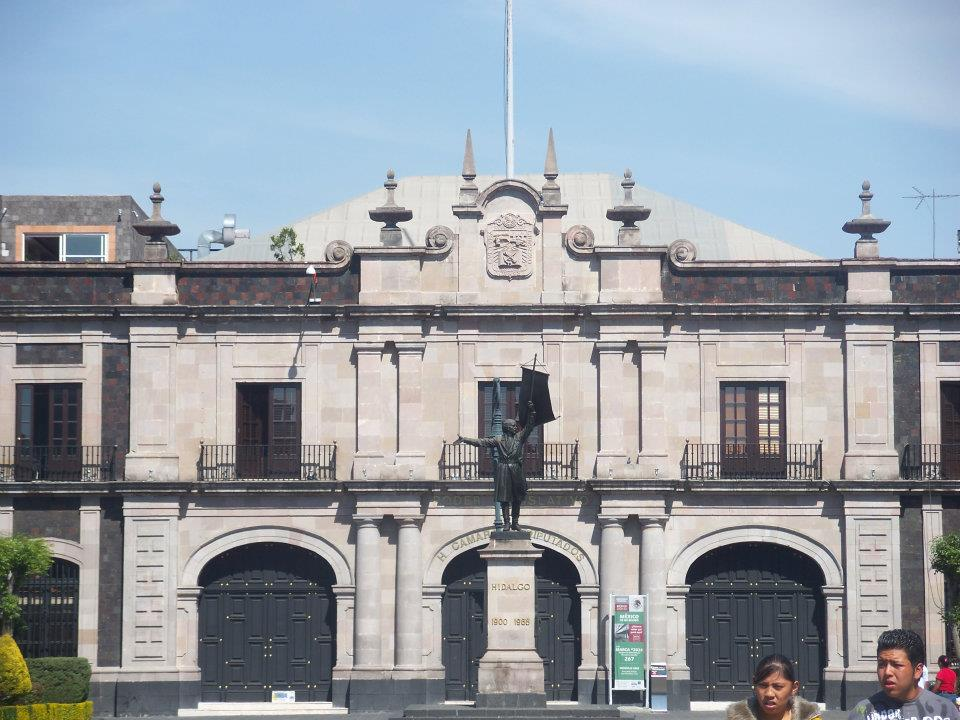
- Recinto del Poder Legislativo, Toluca, Mexico, Mexico

Website
- LX Legislatura del Estado de México

The Congress of the State of México (Spanish: Congreso del Estado de México) is the legislative branch of the government of the State of Mexico. The unicameral Congress is the governmental deliberative body of the State of Mexico, which is equal to, and independent of, the executive.

At present it is composed of an assembly of 75 deputies, 45 of whom are elected in electoral districts on a first-past-the-post basis and 30 being elected through a system of proportional representation. Deputies are elected to serve for a three-year term. Its headquarters are in the Recinto del Poder Legislativo, in the City of Toluca.

== See also ==
- List of Mexican state congresses
