= Same-sex marriage in Sinaloa =

Same-sex marriage has been legal in Sinaloa since 30 June 2021. On 12 June 2021, a federal court ordered the Congress of Sinaloa to pass a same-sex marriage law by 15 June, in accordance with jurisprudence established by the Supreme Court of Justice of the Nation. Subsequently, same-sex marriage legislation passed Congress unanimously on 15 June. It was published in the official state journal on 29 June, and entered into force the following day, making Sinaloa the 20th Mexican state to legalize same-sex marriage.

== Legal status ==
=== Background ===
In January 2013, the state's Family Code was changed to limit marriage and cohabitation to heterosexual couples. Three injunctions were filed to contest the changes, but they were dismissed. On 2 September 2014, Deputy Sandra Yudit Lara Díaz from the Institutional Revolutionary Party (PRI) introduced a bill to amend articles 40 and 165 of the Family Code to legalise same-sex marriage in Sinaloa. Article 40 described marriage as the "union of a man and a woman" and article 165 similarly defined concubinage as between "a man and a woman". In February 2015, the conservative National Action Party (PAN) introduced a civil union bill, which was criticized by LGBTQ organizations as it would have banned children of same-sex partners from residing with their parents. Both this bill and the measure introduced by Lara Díaz were not voted on, facing years of delay and lingering in Congress.

On 12 July 2013, Judge Teddy Abraham Torres López of the Seventh District Court in Los Mochis granted an amparo to a same-sex couple who sought to marry, ruling that the Congress of Sinaloa must comply with the constitutional obligations of equality and non-discrimination. The case was appealed to the Supreme Court of Justice of the Nation, which ruled against the state on 15 April 2015. On 24 September 2014, the Supreme Court granted 3 amparos sought in Culiacán and declared articles 40 and 165 of the Family Code unconstitutional. In mid-October 2014, 70 people from Mazatlán filed an amparo for same-sex marriage rights in the Ninth District Court. In March 2016, the First Chamber of the Mexican Supreme Court declared articles 40 and 165 unconstitutional when it ruled against the state in two appeals challenging earlier verdicts in favor of several same-sex couples. Another amparo was granted to a male same-sex couple from El Fuerte in January 2017.

On 23 November 2014, the Supreme Court ruled that Sinaloa's law limiting concubinage to heterosexual couples was unconstitutional. This decision came in response to an amparo requested by a lesbian couple.

=== Legislative action ===
On 25 November 2016, the Mexican Supreme Court ruled that Sinaloa's same-sex marriage ban violated Articles 1 and 4 of the Constitution of Mexico. State officials refused to abide by the decision and continued to enforce the state's discriminatory same-sex marriage ban. On 15 May 2018, approximately 17 months later, the Supreme Court ordered the state to legalize same-sex marriage within 90 days or face unspecified consequences. However, that deadline also passed without the state legalizing same-sex marriage. On 19 June 2019, Congress rejected same-sex marriage legislation by 20 votes to 18, including six legislators from the National Regeneration Movement (MORENA) voting against, despite having been elected on a party platform supporting same-sex marriage.

On 12 June 2021, a federal court ordered the Congress of Sinaloa to legalize same-sex marriage within three days, with any legislators who voted against the bill to be found in contempt of court and unable to run for or hold office for seven years. On 15 June 2021, Congress voted 23–0 to pass a bill legalizing same-sex marriage, with all dissenters marking themselves absent for the vote. Governor Quirino Ordaz Coppel subsequently signed the bill into law, and it was published in the official journal on 29 June. The law entered into force on 30 June, and the first same-sex marriage under the new law occurred in Culiacán on 9 July between Janeth Guadalupe Corral Tapia and María de Jesús Cabanillas González.

Article 40 of the Family Code was amended to read as follows:

- in Spanish: El matrimonio es una institución por medio de la cual se establece la unión voluntaria y jurídica de dos personas, con igualdad de derechos, deberes y obligaciones, en la que ambos se procuran respeto y ayuda mutua.
- (Marriage is an institution through which the voluntary and legal union of two people is established, with equal rights, duties and obligations, in which both partners seek mutual respect and aid.)

Political party	Members	Yes	No	Abstain	Absent
National Regeneration Movement	21	18			3
Institutional Revolutionary Party	8				8
Labor Party	5	2			3
National Action Party	2				2
Independent	2	1			1
Partido Sinaloense	1	1			
Social Encounter Party	1	1			
Total	40	23	0	0	17

== Marriage statistics ==
The following table shows the number of same-sex marriages performed in Sinaloa since 2021 as reported by the National Institute of Statistics and Geography.

Number of marriages performed in Sinaloa
Year	Same-sex			Opposite-sex	Total	% same-sex
Year	Female	Male	Total	Opposite-sex	Total	% same-sex
2021	21	11	32	15,740	15,772	0.20%

== Public opinion ==
According to a 2018 survey by the National Institute of Statistics and Geography, 38% of the Sinaloa public opposed same-sex marriage.

== See also ==
- Same-sex marriage in Mexico
- LGBT rights in Mexico
