= Congress of Oaxaca =

Mexican state legislature

Coordinates: 16°59′33″N 96°45′12″W

Congress of the State of Oaxaca Congreso del Estado de Oaxaca
- LXVI Legislature

Type
- Type: Unicameral

History
- Founded: 6 July 1823

Leadership
- President: Eva Diego Cruz, PVEM
- Vice President: Isaac López López, Morena
- 1st Secretary: Irma Pineda Santiago, PT

Structure
- Seats: 42 diputados
- Political groups: Morena (28) FXM (3) Independent (3) PT (3) PVEM (3) MC (1) PRI (1)
- Length of term: 3 years
- Authority: Title 4, Chapter II of the Political Constitution of the Free and Sovereign State of Oaxaca

Elections
- Voting system: 25 seats with first-past-the-post and 17 with proportional representation
- Last election: 2024 Oaxaca State Elections
- Next election: 2027

Meeting place
- Calle 14 Oriente #1; San Raymundo Jalpan, Oaxaca, Mexico

Website
- http://www.congresooaxaca.gob.mx/

The Congress of the State of Oaxaca (Spanish: Congreso del Estado de Oaxaca) is the legislature of Oaxaca, a state of Mexico. The Congress is unicameral.

== Electoral system ==
There are 42 seats, 25 deputies are elected with first-past-the-post in single-member districts and 17 are elected through proportional representation. The chamber is renewed every three years.

== Authority ==
The laws and powers of the Congress are stated in Title 4, Chapter II of the Political Constitution of the Free and Sovereign State of Oaxaca.

== Location ==
The Congress is located in the municipality of San Raymundo Jalpan in the metropolitan area of the city of Oaxaca de Juárez.

== See also ==
- List of Mexican state congresses
