= Rosa Adriana Díaz =

Mexican politician

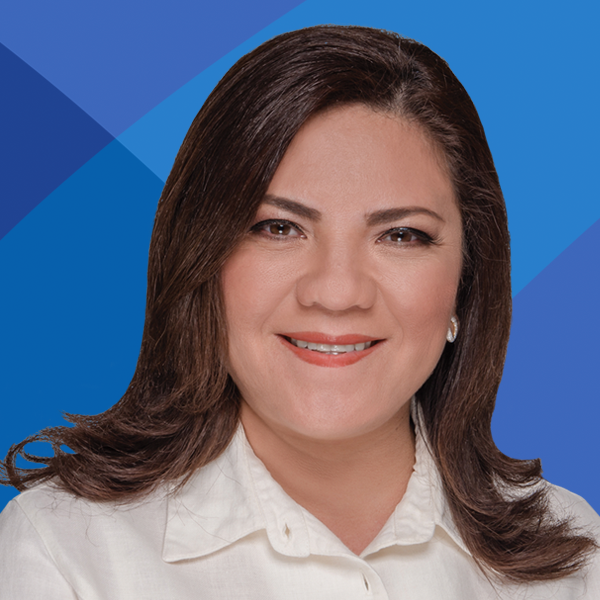
- Born: 16 November 1973 (age 52); Yucatán, Mexico
- Education: Universidad Mesoamericana de San Agustín; Anahuac Mayab University
- Occupation: Senator
- Political party: PAN

Rosa Adriana Díaz Lizama (born 16 November 1973) is a Mexican politician affiliated with the PAN. She served as a Senator of the LXII Legislature of the Mexican Congress and as Deputy during the LXI Legislature representing Yucatán, as well as the LVII Legislature of the Congress of Yucatán.
