= Congress of Tlaxcala =

Legislature of Tlaxcala, Mexico

Congress of Tlaxcala Congreso del Estado de Tlaxcala
- LXIV Legislature

Type
- Type: Unicameral

History
- Founded: 1857

Leadership
- President: Laura Alejandra Ramírez Ortiz, PAC
- Vice President: José Gilberto Temoltzin Martínez, PAN
- First Secretary: Maribel León Cruz, PVEM
- Second secretary: Lorena Ruiz García, PT
- First Pro-secretary: Brenda Cecilia Villantes Rodríguez, MORENA
- Second Pro-secretary: Jorge Caballero Román, MORENA

Structure
- Seats: 25
- Political groups: MORENA (7) PRI (3) PT (3) PANAL (2) PRD (2) PVEM (2) FXM (1) PAC (1) PAN (1) PES (1) Independent (1)
- Authority: Title IV, Chapter I, Article 31 of the Political Constitution of the Free and Sovereign State of Tlaxcala

Elections
- Voting system: First-past-the-post for 15 electoral district seats and Mixed-member proportional representation for 10 proportional representation seats
- Last election: 2 June 2024
- Next election: 2027

Meeting place
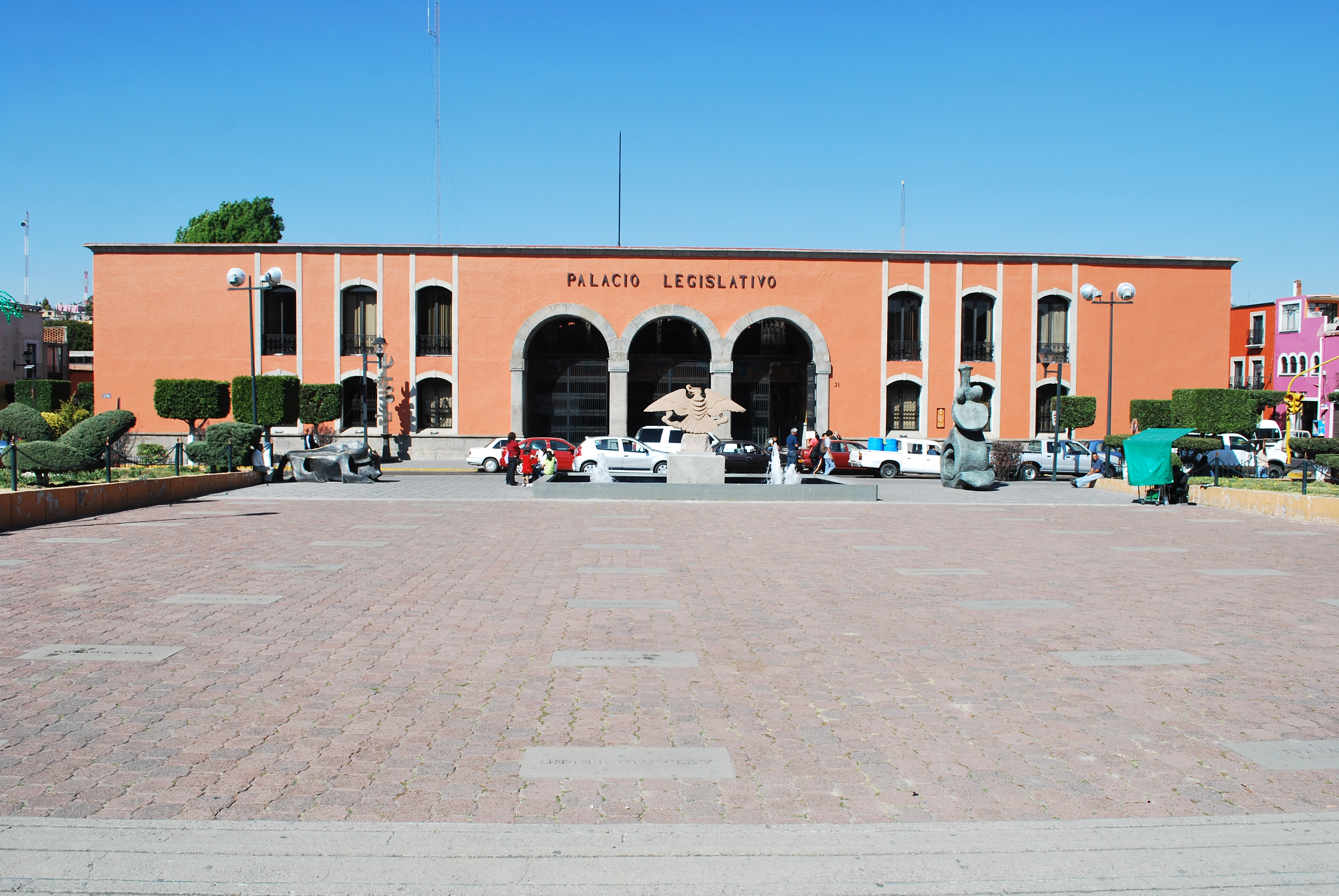
- Legislative Palace, Tlaxcala City, Tlaxcala, Mexico

Website
- Congress of the State of Tlaxcala

The Congress of the State of Tlaxcala (Spanish: Congreso del Estado de Tlaxcala) is the legislative branch of the government of the State of Tlaxcala. The Congress is the governmental deliberative body of Tlaxcala, which is equal to, and independent of, the executive.

The Congress is unicameral and consists of 25 deputies. 15 deputies are elected on a first-past-the-post basis, one for each district in which the entity is divided, while 10 are elected through a system of proportional representation. Deputies are elected to serve for a three-year term.

== See also ==
- List of Mexican state congresses
