= Congress of Campeche =

Legislature of Campeche, Mexico

Congress of the State of Campeche Congreso del Estado de Campeche
- LXV Legislature

Type
- Type: Unicameral

History
- Founded: 2 March 1861

Structure
- Seats: 35 diputados
- Political groups: Government (10) MORENA (6) PT (2) PVEM (2) Opposition (25) MORENA (10) MC (10) PRI (3) PAN (2)
- Length of term: 3 years
- Authority: Chapter XI, Article 29 of the Political Constitution of the State of Campeche
- Salary: $63,480 pesos per month (including $20,000 of management expenses)

Elections
- Voting system: 21 with first-past-the-post and 14 with proportional representation
- Last election: 2 June 2024
- Next election: 2027

Meeting place
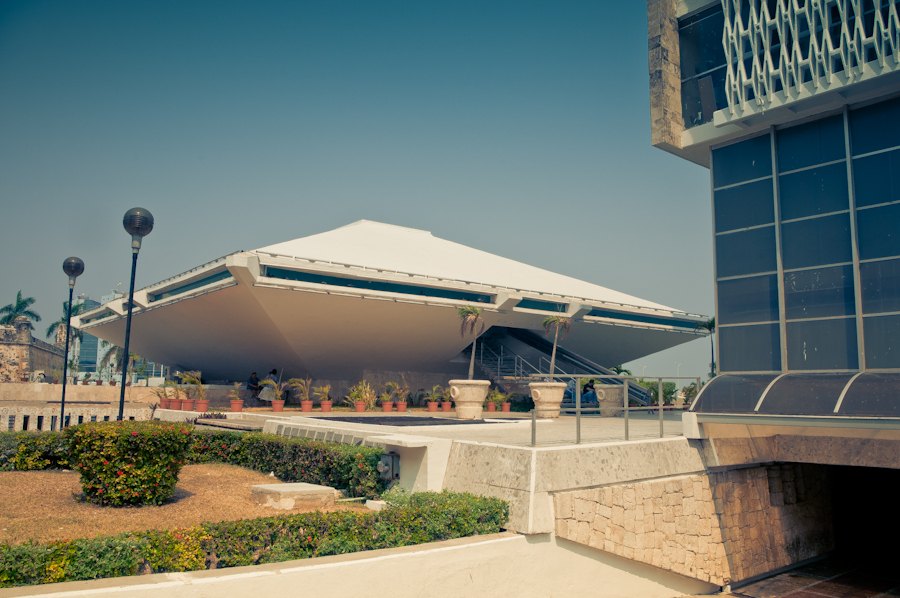
- Palacio Legislativo, Calle 8 s/n, Zona Centro, 24000, San Francisco de Campeche, Campeche, Mexico

Website
- http://www.congresocam.gob.mx/

The Congress of the State of Campeche (Spanish: Congreso del Estado de Campeche, Yucatec Maya: u Noj Mola’ayil u Péetlu’umil Kaampech) is the legislature of Campeche, a state of Mexico. The Congress is unicameral. The legislature was established on 2 March 1861.

== Electoral system ==
There are 35 seats, 21 deputies are elected with first-past-the-post in single-member districts and 14 are elected through proportional representation. The chamber is renewed every three years.

== Authority ==
The authority of the Congress is stated in Chapter XI, Article 29 of the Political Constitution of the State of Campeche.

== Historical composition ==
This chart shows the historical composition of the Congress of Campeche from the LV Legislature to the present. It reflects the party affiliations of deputies at the time of their election and does not account for subsequent party switching.

Congress of Campeche, 1994 to present

PAN / PRI / PARM / PRD / PT / PVEM / MC / PANAL / MORENA			Total
LV	1994	1 / 1 / 3 / 22 / 3	30
LVI	1997	1 / 12 / 19 / 3	35
LVII	2000	1 / 3 / 19 / 12	35
LVIII	2003	1 / 3 / 18 / 13	35
LIX	2006	3 / 2 / 1 / 16 / 13	35
LX	2009	3 / 17 / 1 / 14	35
LXI	2012	1 / 2 / 1 / 2 / 20 / 9	35
LXII	2015	3 / 1 / 2 / 15 / 3 / 11	35
LXIII	2018	2 / 11 / 1 / 2 / 12 / 1 / 6	35
LXIV	2021	16 / 9 / 8 / 2	35
LXV	2024	2 / 16 / 10 / 3 / 2 / 2	35

== See also ==
- List of Mexican state congresses
- Governor of Campeche
