= LGBTQ culture in Mexico City =

LGBTQ life and culture in Mexico City

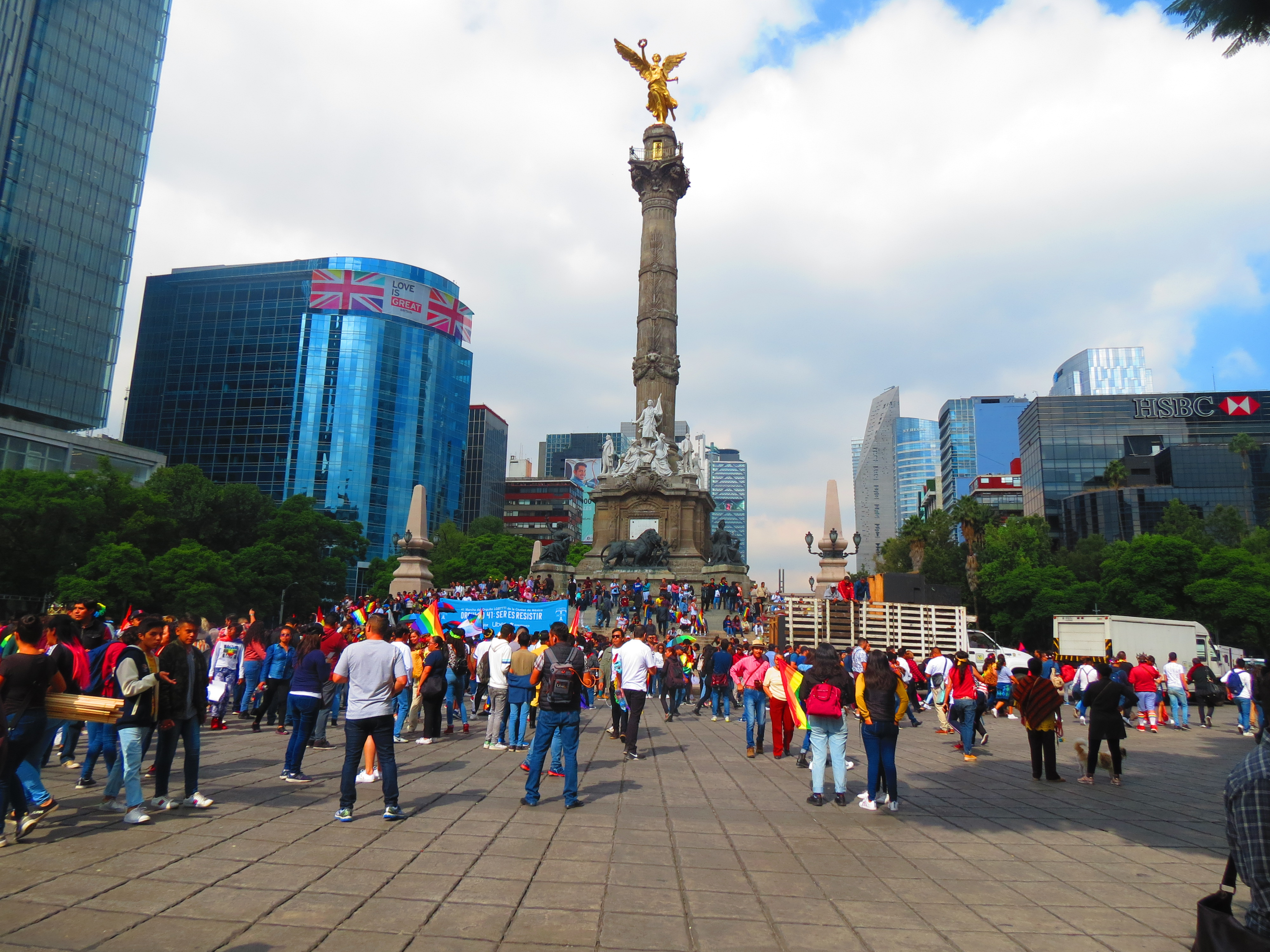
Mexico City Pride, 2019

Mexico City has one of the largest and most visible LGBTQ communities in Latin America. It became the first major city in Latin America to legalize same-sex marriage in 2010. In 2019, Oscar Lopez of Slate said Mexico City "has become something of a queer oasis. It's here where LGBTQ people enjoy more rights than anywhere else in the country".

Gay nightlife is concentrated in the Zona Rosa and on República de Cuba street in the historic center, with bars split by class, age and type, from leather and cowboy bars to drag cabarets. Sex is unusually public by international standards: strippers in gay bars perform fully nude, several venues stage live sex shows, the old working-class steam baths double as gay meeting places, hourly-rate motels (hoteles de paso) host app dates and couples, cruising clubs open in the afternoon on Eje Central, and the last car of the Metro has been used for sex since the system opened in 1969. Male street sex work is visible in the Zona Rosa and Colonia Juárez, and trans sex workers work on Puente de Alvarado, Insurgentes Sur and Calzada de Tlalpan, among other streets. Online, Grindr is by far the most used gay app.

The Pride march, first held in 1979, drew about 260,000 people in 2024 and brings the city over a billion pesos (about US$60 million, 2025) in business. The bars are also home to the city's drag and ballroom scene. Lesbian groups have been part of the movement since the 1970s. The public Clínica Condesa runs one of Latin America's largest HIV programs, and in 2021 the city opened the country's first public clinic for trans people. The Museo del Chopo has hosted an LGBTQ cultural festival since 1987, and lucha libre has its openly camp exóticos. Brands such as Aeroméxico court the "pink market" with Pride campaigns. There are organizations for LGBTQ migrants and trans women, and walking tours of LGBTQ history. It legalized same-sex marriage before New York, Paris or London, but international travel rankings put those cities ahead, and violence is still high: in 2024 the city had more killings of LGBTQ people, most of them trans women, than any other Mexican state. Its laws protect sexual orientation and gender identity, allow a change of legal gender by administrative procedure, ban conversion therapy, and make the killing of a trans woman a separate crime.

== History ==
In 1901 police raided a private ball attended by 41 men, about half of them dressed as women. The Dance of the Forty-One became a national scandal, and the number 41 is still associated with homosexuality in Mexico. For decades the number was avoided: houses, hotel rooms and army units skipped it, and people said nobody turns 41. In 2019 the 41st Pride march took the slogan "Orgullo 41". From the 1950s to the 1980s the city was hostile to its gay population. Machismo and homophobia kept most men from living openly, though the dandies of the 1920s had already challenged sexual and gender norms, and a liberation movement grew from the 1970s on.

Gay bars existed long before any called itself gay. The cantinas Oasis and Viena, near República de Cuba, were known as gay meeting places for decades; city inspectors at one time went in undercover and fined bars where they saw men kissing. A gay scene formed in the Zona Rosa in the 1950s, and by the 1985 Mexico City earthquake the Zona Rosa had become the more glamorous alternative to the downtown bars.

The first gay bar in the city, Madreselva, opened in 1949, followed in 1951 by Los Eloínes, which drew a wealthier crowd. In 1971 the writer and theater director Nancy Cárdenas co-founded the Frente de Liberación Homosexual, the country's first gay rights group. In 1973 she became the first person to come out on Mexican television, on Jacobo Zabludovsky's newscast 24 Horas, the most watched in the country. On 26 July 1978 an openly gay contingent joined a march for the Cuban Revolution, and a larger one marched on 2 October that year. The first Pride march, on 29 June 1979, was organized by the Frente Homosexual de Acción Revolucionaria (FHAR), the Grupo Lambda de Liberación Homosexual and the lesbian group Oikabeth.

El Nueve opened on 23 January 1977 on Londres street in the Zona Rosa. It was founded by the Frenchman Henri Donnadieu and Manolo Fernández and is generally called the country's first openly gay bar. At first a discreet club for well-off closeted men, it opened to everyone in the 1980s and became a center of the city's rock, punk and cabaret scene until it closed on 6 December 1989. Its story is told in Guillermo Osorno's book Tengo que morir todas las noches, later a television series.

== Rights and politics ==
Discrimination based on sexual orientation was first written into the city's civil code in 1999. Mexico's first federal anti-discrimination law followed on 11 June 2003; it created the Consejo Nacional para Prevenir la Discriminación (CONAPRED). In December 2009 the Legislative Assembly changed Article 146 of the Civil Code to define marriage as "the free union between two people", and Mexico City became the first capital in Latin America with same-sex marriage. The National Action Party (PAN) tried to put the law to a referendum, which the Assembly rejected, and Attorney General Arturo Chávez Chávez challenged it in court; adoption by same-sex couples was upheld. The Civil Registry holds free collective weddings, which have married more than 2,500 couples.

In 2014 the city reformed its Civil Code so that anyone can change the name and gender on their birth certificate through a half-hour administrative procedure, with no court case or medical report. People from at least 16 other states have come to the city to use it. In July 2020 the city Congress made conversion therapy a crime, punishable by two to five years in prison; a federal ban followed in 2024.

The "Ley Paola Buenrostro" makes the murder of a trans person punishable by up to 70 years in prison. The city legislature passed it 45 to 1, the second state-level law of its kind in Mexico. It is named for Paola Buenrostro, a 25-year-old trans sex worker killed by a client on Puente de Alvarado on 30 September 2016. Her friend Kenya Cuevas witnessed the killing and became one of the country's best-known trans activists. In 2021 the city prosecutor's office publicly apologized for its handling of the case.

=== Anti-LGBTQ violence ===
The laws have not stopped the violence. Mexico has the second-highest number of anti-LGBTQ killings in Latin America, after Brazil. Letra S counted at least 80 such killings nationwide in 2024. Mexico City had 17, more than any other state; 11 of the victims were trans women. The group has recorded 53 killings of trans women in the city between 2007 and 2024, although the city has more public policies for trans people than any other state. A separate report by a coalition of local groups counted 18 killings, six disappearances and eight attacks in the city in 2024. It found that recorded crimes rose 176 percent over the year before, and that the Cuauhtémoc borough, which includes the Zona Rosa and the historic center, had the most cases since 2016, followed by Iztapalapa.

=== International comparison ===
Mexico City legalized same-sex marriage in December 2009. That was before New York State (2011), France (2013) and England and Wales (2014). Its nightlife is also more permissive than in most U.S. cities: there, nude dancing and alcohol are usually kept apart by law (see above). But travel-industry rankings still put New York, London and Paris at the top for LGBTQ travelers, on the strength of their number of venues and their safety scores, and Mexico City does not appear near the top of these lists. A 2024 Time Out ranking by LGBTQ editors listed Puerto Vallarta second in the world but did not include Mexico City. Within Mexico, the city government declared it an LGBTQ "Friendly City" in 2015, and the national LGBT tourism business association has named it the country's best urban LGBT destination. A per-capita index of gay-friendly businesses in world cities by political scientist Javier Corrales ranked several Latin American capitals above New York.

=== In government ===
Former mayor and later president Claudia Sheinbaum has expressed her support for the LGBTQ community; among other things, the city ended gender-specific school uniforms. In 2020 Javier Berain became the city police's first openly gay commanding officer. Temístocles Villanueva, an openly gay Morena legislator in the city Congress, sponsored the conversion therapy ban and the 2021 Ley para el Reconocimiento y la Atención de las Personas LGBT+, which passed 45 to 1. In 2025 Mayor Clara Brugada named the lesbian lawyer Hilda Téllez the first executive secretary of the city's Unidad de Atención a la Diversidad Sexual y de Género. Openly LGBT officials in her government also include culture secretary Ana Francis Mor and Villanueva.

== Pride and events ==
The first Pride march was held in 1979. In 2024 the 46th march drew about 260,000 people, though the city Congress put attendance at over a million. The march runs along Paseo de la Reforma from the Angel of Independence to the city center.

Estimates of its economic impact vary widely. The national chamber of commerce, Concanaco Servytur, put it at 5,500 million pesos (about US$300 million, 2024) for 2024; the city's economic development ministry (Sedeco) estimated 1,098 million pesos (about US$57 million, 2025) for 2025; and the employers' federation Coparmex estimated 1,154 million pesos (about US$63 million, 2026) for 2026, spread over 11,668 businesses, more than 80 percent of them micro and small businesses.

In 2014 the city hosted the global conference of the International Lesbian, Gay, Bisexual, Trans and Intersex Association.

== Nightlife ==
=== Bars and clubs ===
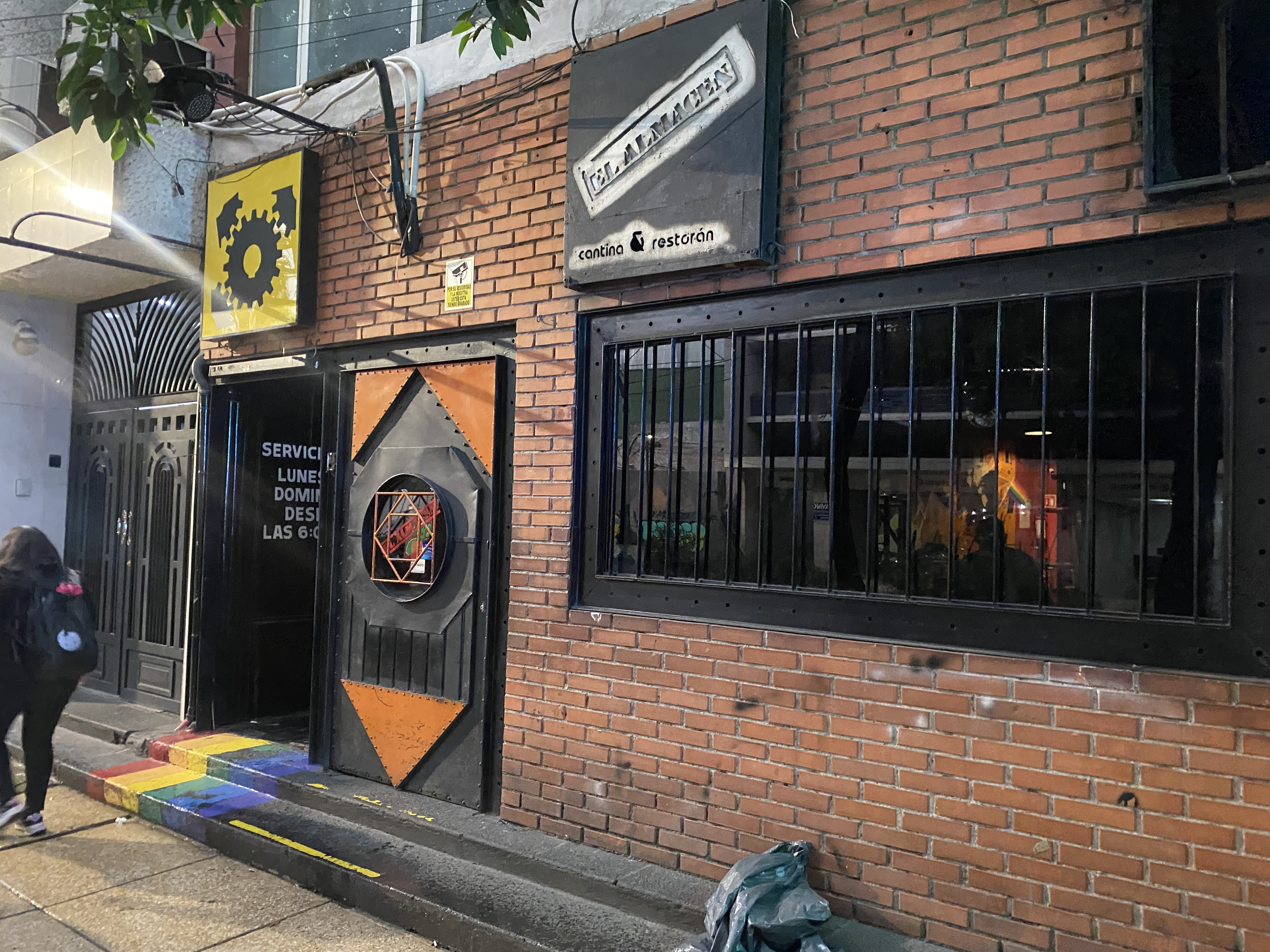
El Almacen, a gay bar in Zona Rosa, Mexico City

The Zona Rosa ("Pink Zone") is the city's most prominent LGBTQ entertainment district, with many gay bars and other nightlife, mostly on Amberes, Florencia, Londres and Génova streets. The second center is República de Cuba street downtown, which is cheaper and rowdier. Time Out credits Marrakech Salón with turning the street into a real alternative to the Zona Rosa; the same owners later opened La Purísima, where staff dress as Catholic nuns and priests. La Cañita is a beach-themed bar and restaurant near downtown. Rvuelta Queer House, in Roma Norte, has been described as an "artsy, queer indoor-outdoor resto-bar-community centre".

The scene is split by class, age and type, more than in most cities. There are bars for bears (Nicho Bears and Bar), cowboys (Vaqueros, and La Malagueña, in the back patio of a western boot store), leather (Tom's Leather Bar) and circuit crowds (Malva, on Amberes). Other gay venues have included Club Roshell, El Nueve and La Perla.

Upper-middle-class gay men, called fresas (literally "strawberries"; Mexican slang for the preppy, well-off upper middle class), long had their own clubs away from the Zona Rosa. The most famous was Living, which started in Roma and in its heyday, the 1990s and 2000s, was in a 1929 pink-stone mansion on Paseo de la Reforma at Río Elba, the former Palace club. It later moved to Bucareli and closed after drug-dealing scandals. The mansion, now called Casa Austin, was moved 20 meters and back to make way for the Torre Reforma, whose lobby it now forms. Envy, founded by Fernando Carbajal in Santa Fe, broke the habit of going out only in the Zona Rosa. It had a strict door and dress code and later moved to Paseo de las Palmas in Lomas de Chapultepec and then to Polanco. Envy and its sister club Guilt were among the first clubs Time Out México reviewed. With velvet-rope chains at the door and a dress code, they sold a fantasy of exclusivity; Wenceslao Bruciaga called them the fulfillment of the upper-middle-class fresa life that many gay men wanted and could pay for. Guilt began on Palmas, later moved to Anatole France street in Polanco, and returned to Palmas in 2019. It now runs on weekends in a Victorian-style house on Coahuila street in Roma Sur, one of the few large gay clubs outside the Zona Rosa. It still enforces a dress code, and its Dragaret show pairs drag with live banda music.

Since the 1990s the Zona Rosa has also become the center of the city's Korean community, known as Pequeño Seúl, around Florencia street. Gentrification, commercial saturation and rising rents have pushed queer venues out of the area, and the scene has spread east of Insurgentes into the rest of Colonia Juárez, toward República de Cuba, and south into Roma and Condesa.

Drag is a staple of the bars. Its local form, transformismo, centers on impersonating Mexican and Latin divas rather than inventing original characters. The most imitated include Gloria Trevi, Yuri, Verónica Castro, Paquita la del Barrio, Jenni Rivera, Mónica Naranjo, Amanda Miguel and Selena. Time Out notes that at some point every night in the city's gay bars, Gloria Trevi starts playing. The Netflix series La Casa de las Flores (2018–2020), set partly in a drag cabaret, cast real transformistas; the trans performer Katia Balmori played its Yuri impersonator. After the series, Salón Gardenia, a cabaret on Paseo de las Palmas, built its show around the same kind of diva imitations, from Verónica Castro and Yuri to Laura León. Mexico City performers who have appeared on Drag Race México include Elektra Vandergeld, Eva Blunt, Luna Lansman and Nina de la Fuente. The city also has a ballroom scene: the House of Machos was the country's first ballroom house, and its events include the Religiosas Ball.

One of the oldest gay clubs in the metropolitan area is outside the city proper. Spartacu's, in Ciudad Nezahualcóyotl, State of Mexico, opened in 1984 in a then working-class suburb with a reputation for crime. It is known for drag (transformismo) shows, dancers in cages and a dark room, and has been listed for decades in the Spartacus International Gay Guide.

Lesbian nightlife is much smaller than the gay male scene. Time Out has called the supply of lesbian bars deficient compared with gay ones, and much of it consists of lesbian nights at mixed bars.

=== Strippers and nudity ===
Time Out México distinguishes between go-go dancers, who leave something to the imagination, and strippers, who do full frontal nudity. Full nudity is a regular part of shows for gay audiences. Tom's Leather Bar has nude dancers on the bar on its regular nude nights. Gay porn actor Charly Díaz has run stripper shows in the Zona Rosa for years under the slogan "the strippers dance for you, not your girlfriends". At his bar Amberes 46 in 2018, the dancing was tame until midnight and fully nude after. His shows later moved to Pribbato-Asifor, also in the Zona Rosa,, which put on a fully nude, men-only XXX show with porn actors Charly Díaz and Ed Torres for Pride 2026. Erections are part of the act: one stripper told Time Out that his routines are fully nude and that he takes erection pills when he has several numbers in a night.

Shows for women are different. In Mexico, male strippers performing for women have kept their genitals covered since the city's first women-only club, Chippendale, opened. The contrast with the United States is larger still: many U.S. states ban fully nude dancing in businesses that serve alcohol, a restriction the Supreme Court upheld in Barnes v. Glen Theatre, Inc. (1991), and until 2024 Washington state did not allow alcohol in nude clubs at all. In Mexico City, gay bars serve alcohol and have fully nude dancers at the same time.

== Bathhouses and cruising ==
=== Bathhouses ===
The city's baños de vapor (steam baths) are a working-class institution, and some double as gay meeting places, usually with no sign or flag. Baños Finisterre, in Colonia San Rafael, has been open since 1954. Time Out calls it the classic of the city's gay community. It notes that the older staff watched it change from a family bathhouse into a gay one, that much of the clientele walks around naked, and that it is busiest on Saturday and Sunday mornings, when it works as an after-hours spot once the clubs close. Downtown, Baños Señorial draws mostly men over 50 and chacales, young, masculine, working-class men.

Sodome, in Anzures, works on a different model. It bills itself as the city's only European-style club sauna, with a bar, DJs, steam rooms, a Turkish bath, a dark labyrinth upstairs and a foam room.

=== Cruising clubs ===
Sexto Piso, on the sixth floor of a building on Eje Central, is a men-only club with a maze, themed rooms and a bar. Time Out calls it the city's byword for uninhibited cruising. The AIDS Healthcare Foundation regularly offers free HIV testing there, and it also holds hard techno parties. The same promoters opened Dallas in the Zona Rosa around 2022, with dark rooms, cabins and a maze. Cabinas Funny Love, also on Eje Central, has been known for decades for its low price and central location. Behind a sex shop is a maze of red-lit corridors lined with cabins, with a dark room and a small bar. Time Out calls it one of the most popular places in the city and says it draws the widest mix of men; it has a newer branch in the Zona Rosa.

=== Hoteles de paso ===
The city's hoteles de paso ("pass-through hotels"), rented by the hour with private garages, are much used for gay sex. They give couples who live with their families, closeted men and app dates a private place to meet. The first ones opened in the 1930s, among them El Silencio on Calzada de Tlalpan in 1935. In the mid-20th century they were the subject of moral panics, mainly over unmarried women, but by the late 1960s they had become broadly accepted. In an ethnographic study of gay tourism and sex work, one man told the researcher that hotels, motels and a few bars were among the only places where he and his partner could show affection. Time Out México has long listed motels where staff do not judge who you check in with; one advertised fast Wi-Fi for finding partners on contact sites. Male sex workers and their clients also use them: a study of the Zona Rosa found that tourists rarely bring sex workers back to their own hotels and instead pay for a room at hotels near the Zona Rosa, in Roma or on Marina Nacional. When the city closed hotels and motels for a month in April 2020 during the COVID-19 pandemic, sex workers protested that they depended on them for work, and some lived in them. A local motel guide claims Mexico City has more love hotels than any other city in the world. The luxury end of the trade, such as the V Motel Boutique chain, also caters to swingers and group sex.

=== Live sex shows ===
Several venues put on live sex shows. Cabinas Funny Love regularly holds events where amateur performers known on "sex Twitter" (sextwitteros) put on live shows; some dance, but mostly they have sex with each other, and audience members can sometimes join in. Funny Love and its Zona Rosa branch have live XXX shows on some days, Dallas has a "sex theater" where patrons put on their own shows, and the Morbo parties, held about once a month, feature live sex and porn actors. El Taller, a basement bar in the Zona Rosa run by the Cabaré-Tito group, is men-only on Sundays, with a live XXX show. In 2018 Time Out reported that Charly Díaz's Amberes 46 might add live sex to its strip shows.

=== Public cruising ===
The Alameda Central, the oldest public park in the Americas, has been a place for men to meet for about a century. The poet Salvador Novo went there at night in the 1920s to pick up young men, a scene shown in Manuel Rodríguez Lozano's painting Salvador Novo en taxi. Before the park was remodeled, the unlit stretch toward Doctor Mora street by the Humboldt statue was used for encounters between men. After 10 p.m., men looking to be paid wait in the Plaza de la Solidaridad, built after the 1985 Mexico City earthquake, and around the Centro Cultural José Martí by the entrance to Hidalgo metro station.

Before there were many gay bars, Sanborns stores were the main meeting places. Men cruised at the magazine stands and moved on to the toilets. The Sanborns at Insurgentes and Aguascalientes was the busiest, and its corner was known as "la esquina mágica" ("the magic corner"). The Sanborns on Niza in the Zona Rosa was so gay that the management tried to drive gay customers out more than once. The Insurgentes Sanborns appears in Luis Zapata's novel El vampiro de la colonia Roma (1979). In the 1990s the Vips restaurant by the Angel of Independence was the most popular with gay men of every class.

The downtown porn cinemas were another meeting place. The art deco Cine Teresa on Eje Central showed porn for decades and became a meeting point for gay men until it closed in 2010. The Cine Savoy had a heterosexual screen downstairs and a gay one upstairs. Other downtown porn cinemas included the Ciudadela, Venus, Cinema Río and Nacional; a study of the Nacional describes sex between men in its seats.

Historian Alonso Hernández has said that men have used the Metro for sex since it opened in 1969, and that since about 2000 the last car (último vagón) has been used for sex almost constantly during operating hours. It is known as la cajita feliz ("the Happy Meal"). Writing for Time Out in 2017, Wenceslao Bruciaga said it is busiest after 11 p.m. on Lines 1 and 2. He also described a wooded path near the Jardín Botánico at Ciudad Universitaria, the toilets of the World Trade Center, and a park by the Velódromo at Viaducto, all of them subject to raids by police or campus security. A study in the journal Sociológica found no record of anything similar on the metro of any other city. In February 2011 the Metro closed certain cars to stop the practice. Public sex is not itself a crime in the city; the civic culture law punishes showing one's genitals only when it is meant to offend and someone files a complaint.

== Dating apps ==
Grindr is the most widely used gay app in Mexico. In its 2020 report Grindr ranked Mexico third in number of users worldwide, after the United States and Brazil. A 2024 survey by The Competitive Intelligence Unit found it was the third most used dating app in the country overall, after Tinder and Bumble. Scruff, popular with bears and older men, Hornet and the Spanish-made Wapo and Wapa are also used.

== Sex work ==
In 2016 the sex workers' organization Brigada Callejera estimated that about a quarter of the city's sex workers were trans women, travestis or transgender people and 5 percent were men. It listed the main areas, most of them in use for close to a century, as La Merced, Zona Rosa, Corregidora, Insurgentes, Taxqueña, Tlalpan, Cuatro Caminos, Sullivan and Puente de Alvarado.

The Cuauhtémoc borough has tried to regulate the trade more than once. In 2001 it signed agreements with about 200 sex workers setting hours, places and dress in San Cosme, Buenavista, Sullivan and Tlalpan, and in 2010 it moved 150 workers, men and women, to a designated "circuit" on Luis Donaldo Colosio street in Buenavista.

=== Men ===
Male street sex work is concentrated in the western Zona Rosa and the neighboring Colonia Juárez, on Hamburgo and Varsovia streets. Researchers call the Zona Rosa the most important area for male–male sex work in the country. Most clients are men over 30, many of them married and living heterosexual lives; a Zona Rosa sex worker interviewed by Vice described them as mostly upper middle class. Clients usually cruise the streets by car, and the workers are known locally as chichifos. Young men also wait for clients around the Glorieta de los Insurgentes, the roundabout at the edge of the Zona Rosa. UNAM researchers interviewed by Infobae in 2017 put the share of men among sex workers higher, at one in five. They described a male circuit that also takes in the Alameda Central, bars in the historic center, La Merced and La Ciudadela. They found more foreign escorts, many of them Argentine, among men advertising online. Escorts also advertise on Mileroticos, a free classified-ads site for sexual services of all kinds that operates in Mexico, Spain, Italy and Colombia. El Universal also reported that mayates could be picked up around Garibaldi and the Alameda Central.

Rates depend on the place, the worker and the service. In 2014 Vice found the men on Reforma and Hamburgo asking at least 500 pesos (about US$38) for 40 minutes, and some up to 1,000 pesos (US$75). The Alameda Central and La Ciudadela are cheaper. A man interviewed at the Alameda in 2013 charged 150 to 200 pesos (US$12–16) for oral sex and 350 to 450 pesos (US$27–35) for intercourse, and said street youths there would go for 50 pesos, a drink or inhalants. In 2016 El Universal reported prices from 50 pesos (US$3) at the Plaza San Fernando, and from 300 to 2,000 pesos (US$16–107) a session for a man at La Ciudadela who saw only women and couples. In 2018 a 22-year-old at La Ciudadela told Vice he asked 400 to 500 pesos (US$21–26) for an hour, 250 to 300 pesos (US$13–16) for oral sex, and 2,000 pesos (US$104) for sex without a condom; he said he had agreed to that only twice. A chacal at the Alameda said in 2020 that he needed to make at least 3,500 to 4,000 pesos (US$160–190) from Friday to Sunday, and that other workers there paid about 300 pesos (US$14) in derecho de piso (protection money).

=== Trans women ===
Trans sex workers have worked the same streets for decades. El Universal named Calzada de Tlalpan, Puente de Alvarado and Insurgentes Sur as the main areas for travestis. Trans workers interviewed by Vice also listed Calzada de Guadalupe, Revolución, Sullivan, Insurgentes, Ejército Nacional, Marina Nacional, Misterios, Tláhuac, Cuitláhuac, Zaragoza, Eduardo Molina and the Condesa, where the youngest work. One said the night shift belongs mostly to trans women. Puente de Alvarado, a few blocks from the Monumento a la Revolución, has been one of the main ones for decades. The corner of Puente de Alvarado and Aldama, known as "la Nissan", is the meeting point there, and the trade spills into the neighboring Tabacalera and Buenavista. In 2021 about twenty trans sex workers blocked Avenida Insurgentes between Liverpool and Niza streets in the Zona Rosa to protest beatings and extortion by police.

On 30 September 2016 Paola Buenrostro, a trans sex worker, was shot dead on Puente de Alvarado by a client after she got into his car; he had haggled with the women on the corner, saying he only had 200 pesos (about US$11). Her case is covered under Anti-LGBTQ violence.

Calzada de Tlalpan has been a sex work corridor since hotels were built along it in the 1930s. It runs for more than six kilometers, and cis and trans women work it day and night. The stretch near San Antonio Abad is known as the "buffet sexual de Tlalpan". Near the Viaducto Metro station, sex workers, including trans women, were displaced when the "Gran Tenochtitlán" cycle lane was built for the 2026 FIFA World Cup. In September 2025 the city agreed to leave 58 open bays along the cycle lane where they could keep working. They say the project cut their income by up to 70 percent, and they blocked the avenue repeatedly from 2025, most recently in October 2026.

In November 2025 a collective of trans workers from the stretch between the San Antonio Abad and Chabacano Metro stations said the city had offered them 18,000 pesos (about US$1,000) and a basket of groceries to stay off the street while a raised walkway was built, but never paid. In May 2026 Brigada Callejera said that in some cases nightly earnings on Tlalpan had fallen from 3,000 pesos (about US$170) to barely 800 (US$45).

== Health ==
The city's public Clínica Especializada Condesa opened on 20 January 2000 to treat HIV and other sexually transmitted infections, and a second clinic later opened in Iztapalapa. Its HIV program is one of the largest in Latin America. In 2023 the two clinics carried out 43,066 HIV tests, of which 3,502 (8.1 percent) were positive. The city offers free pre-exposure prophylaxis (PrEP); by February 2024 almost 10,000 people had started it, and the clinics also serve people from other states.

On 1 October 2021 Mayor Claudia Sheinbaum opened the Unidad de Salud Integral para Personas Trans, the first public clinic for trans people in Mexico, after trans activists asked for care separate from the HIV clinic. It offers hormone therapy and mental health care and is partly staffed by trans people; it cost 33.5 million pesos (about US$1.6 million, 2021) together with a neighboring integrative medicine center. It is still the only one of its kind in the country, and its consultations grew by 145 percent in one year.

== Business and advertising ==
In the 2010s companies began openly courting the "pink market". In 2017 Expansión named Aeroméxico, Doritos and Cabify among the brands running campaigns in support of LGBTQ people. Cabify's "They Hate, We Love" counted the comments on its videos and gave free kilometers on the day of the Mexico City march, and the head of the American Marketing Association's Mexico chapter put the LGBTQ market at about US$8 billion. Aeroméxico has run Pride campaigns since at least 2018, among them "El amor no debe ser un secreto" ("Love should not be a secret", 2024), which went viral, and a 2025 campaign built around families accepting their LGBTQ children. The airline marches in the city's Pride parade and has trained its staff on diversity for two decades. A study in Telos still found a clear gap in advertising aimed at gay men in Mexico and Latin America.

== Community and organizations ==
Many of the city's LGBTQ subgroups formed in response to hate crimes and the fear they cause, and built their own communities of resistance. El ambiente ("the scene") is the everyday local term for queer space and the relationships inside it, whether intimate, affectionate, ideological or material. The word queer is seen as a Western import used mostly in academic settings; el ambiente has a more masculine character. Trans women have organized against the high number of killings of trans people, and some have formed coalitions with lesbians, on the basis that anyone who presents as feminine faces a higher risk of harassment and femicide.

=== Identity and relationships ===
The first U.S. anthropologists to study homosexuality in Mexico described a system in which only the passive partner was seen as homosexual, while the active partner kept a masculine, heterosexual identity. Later Mexican scholars such as Guillermo Núñez Noriega criticized this as an ethnocentric view that narrowed a much wider range of experience. Men who have sex with men but do not call themselves gay remain a large group; public health research in the city uses the category "HSH" (hombres que tienen sexo con hombres) for them. Local slang has its own terms. A chichifo is a younger, better-looking man in a relationship with an older one in exchange for money, gifts or status, as distinct from an escort.

A 2014 study of same-sex couples in the city, published in Salud Mental, described their daily lives as shaped by legal rights and homophobic violence at the same time. Coming out was most often prompted by a committed relationship, time spent living abroad, reading, or socializing in el ambiente. Interviews with three generations of gay men in the city linked social stigma to depression, anxiety, substance use and unsafe sex. A national survey at men's meeting places found 16 percent of participants were HIV-positive, while only 5.4 percent thought they were. The city's legal openness also draws LGBTQ people from the rest of the country; people from at least 16 other states have come to change the gender on their birth certificates. Other local slang includes buga for a heterosexual and glorietera for a young gay man who hangs around the Glorieta de los Insurgentes, often waiting there for the Metro to open after a night out in the Zona Rosa.

=== Class ===
Gay life in the city is split by class. At the top, the fresa clubs, Living on Reforma and Envy and Guilt in Santa Fe, Lomas and Polanco, used doormen and dress codes to keep a well-off crowd together. El Nueve began the same way, as a club for wealthy closeted men, before it opened to everyone in the 1980s. In the 1990s the Vips restaurant by the Ángel was one of the few places that drew gay men of every class. The Zona Rosa has always been the mixed middle ground. The cantinas of República de Cuba and the steam baths of the Centro and San Rafael drew a more working-class crowd, and their chacales (young, masculine, working-class men). Further out, Spartacu's in Ciudad Nezahualcóyotl has served the working-class east of the metropolitan area since 1984. The cheapest is the last car of the Metro. A fare of a few pesos made it attractive to men who could not afford clubs and bars, and researchers describe most of its users as lower- or middle-class men, many of whom do not identify as gay.

=== Organizations ===
Lesbians organized early, and often on their own. Grupo Lesbos, founded in 1977, was the first formal lesbian group, followed by Oikabeth in 1978; both grew out of the feminist and student left of the 1970s. Oikabeth's co-founder Yan María Castro led Marxist-Leninist lesbian groups in the city until 1987, when the city hosted the first Latin American and Caribbean lesbian feminist meeting. Patria Jiménez became the first openly lesbian member of the federal Chamber of Deputies in 1997, and Enoé Uranga, the city's first lesbian legislator, introduced the civil union law (Ley de Sociedades de Convivencia) in 2001. Women also marry more often than men: of the 6,312 same-sex marriages registered in Mexico in 2024, 3,879 were between women and 2,433 between men.

Kenya Cuevas founded Casa de las Muñecas Tiresias in 2018 to support trans women, sex workers, drug users and people with HIV. In December 2019 she opened Casa Hogar Paola Buenrostro, the country's first shelter for trans women. Casa Frida works with about 300 LGBTQ asylum seekers and migrants in the city, as well as in Monterrey and Tapachula. The Organization for Refuge, Asylum and Migration (ORAM) has raised money for shelter, food and transportation for LGBTQ refugees in the city.

== Tours ==
The Jotitour is a walking tour of the historic center that covers some 500 years of the city's LGBTQ history. Historian Alonso Hernández, a graduate of the National School of Anthropology and History, gave the first one in 2007; it is now run by his collective Archivos y Memorias Diversas, which collects documents and stories of the city's LGBTQ community. The three-hour route starts at the Centro Cultural José Martí, with its plaque to the 41, and goes by the Plaza de Santo Domingo, where the Inquisition tried Cotita de la Encarnación, to the Hemiciclo a Juárez, a landmark in the history of the Pride march. As of 2024 it ran four times a year.

Divercitours, an LGBTQ-owned company run by Mexico City native Saúl Franco, offers tours of the historic center, gay bar tours and a "gay underground" tour. National Geographic described it in 2026 as a company that shows off the city's diversity. Gay Hopping Mexico runs guided nights out at gay clubs, where its guide Chapu introduces visitors to doormen and managers.

== Arts and popular culture ==
Since 1987 the Museo Universitario del Chopo of UNAM has hosted the Semana Cultural Lésbico-Gay, started by activist José María Covarrubias. It grew from a week into a month-long event and in 2011 became the Festival Internacional por la Diversidad Sexual (FIDS); its exhibitions, talks and performances took up same-sex marriage and gender identity laws years before the legislature did.

In the visual arts, the painter Nahum B. Zenil, who has lived in the city since his student years, began painting openly homoerotic self-portraits in the 1980s, mixing his own body with the Virgin of Guadalupe, Frida Kahlo and national symbols. He and Julio Galán became the best-known gay painters of the neomexicanismo movement, and Zenil was one of the founders of the Chopo festival. In 2013 Salvador Irys and the artist Fernando Osorno opened Hazme el Milagrito in Roma, the city's first gallery for gay art. They later moved to Eucalipto 20, a 1903 house in Santa María la Ribera that was once the headquarters of the FHAR, now an LGBTQ cultural center with a gallery, cabaret and an archive of the movement. In December 2019 Fabián Cháirez's painting La Revolución, which shows Emiliano Zapata nude on a horse in high heels and a pink hat, was used to promote a centenary exhibition at the Palacio de Bellas Artes. Zapata's descendants threatened to sue, and members of a farmers' organization stormed the museum to demand its removal and clashed with LGBTQ activists outside; the museum kept the painting on display.

Cabaret is another strong tradition. El Vicio, a theater bar first opened by Salvador Novo in 1954, later became one of the main cabaret stages in the country under the name El Hábito.

Lucha libre has its exóticos, wrestlers who perform in feathers, sequins and makeup and kiss their opponents. The type goes back to the 1940s, with wrestlers such as Gardenia Davis; in the 1980s some exóticos began to say openly that they were gay, and the macho sport became unusually friendly to the LGBTQ community. The best known, Cassandro, was the subject of a 2023 film starring Gael García Bernal.

Carlos Monsiváis saw the 1901 ball of the 41 as the start of modern sexual identity in Mexico, and the event was made into the film El baile de los 41 (2020).

Some TV series are set in the city's gay world. In the Netflix series Sense8 (2015–2018), by Lana and Lilly Wachowski, the Spanish actor Miguel Ángel Silvestre plays Lito Rodríguez, a closeted action-movie star in Mexico City whose relationship with his boyfriend Hernando (Alfonso Herrera) is exposed when sex photos of the couple leak to the tabloids, after which he struggles to find work. Alfonso Herrera later played Ignacio de la Torre, the son-in-law of Porfirio Díaz said to have escaped the 1901 raid, in El baile de los 41. Manolo Caro's La Casa de las Flores (2018–2020), a dark comedy about an upper-class Mexico City family whose florist hides a drag cabaret, has several LGBTQ main characters, including the gay couple Julián and Diego and the trans woman María José. The casting of the cisgender Spanish actor Paco León as María José caused controversy, but the character became one of the series' most popular.

This Is Not Berlin (2019) is about a teenager living in the city during the 1986 World Cup and has been described as a "love letter" to Mexico City's queer punks.

== See also ==
- LGBTQ culture in Mexico
- Lesbian culture in Mexico City
- LGBTQ rights in Mexico City
- Nicho Bears and Bar
- LGBTQ culture in Tijuana
