= Same-sex marriage in Mexico City =

Same-sex marriage has been legal in Mexico City since 4 March 2010. A bill for the legalization of same-sex marriages was approved by the Legislative Assembly on 21 December 2009, and signed into law by Head of Government Marcelo Ebrard on 29 December. The law became effective on 4 March 2010. Mexico City was the first jurisdiction in Mexico and the first in Latin America to legalize same-sex marriage. Polling suggests that a majority of Mexico City residents support the legal recognition of same-sex marriage.

Civil unions, which offer some of the rights, benefits and obligations of marriage, have been recognized for same-sex couples since 16 March 2007.

== Civil unions ==
Being the seat of the Powers of the Union, Mexico City did not belong to any particular state but to all. After years of demanding greater political autonomy, residents were given the right to directly elect the Head of Government of Mexico City and the representatives of the unicameral Legislative Assembly by popular vote in 1997. For the following two decades, the center-left Party of the Democratic Revolution (PRD) controlled both political powers.

In the early 2000s, Enoé Uranga, an openly lesbian politician and activist, unsuccessfully pushed a bill that would have legalized same-sex civil unions in Mexico City under the name "cohabitation partnership" (Spanish: sociedad de convivencia, pronounced [sosjeˈðað de kombiˈβensja]). Despite being passed four times by legislative commissions, the bill repeatedly got stuck in plenary voting for its sensitive nature, which could be attributed to widespread opposition from right-wing groups and Head of Government Andrés Manuel López Obrador's ambiguity concerning the bill. Nonetheless, as new left-wing Head of Government Marcelo Ebrard was expected to take power in December 2006, the Assembly decided to take up the bill and approved it in a 43–17 vote on 9 November 2006. The law was well received by feminist and LGBT groups, including Emilio Álvarez Icaza, chairman of Mexico City's Human Rights Commission, who declared that "the law was not a threat to anyone in particular, and that it will be a matter of time before it shows positive consequences for different social groups." It was strongly opposed by right-wing groups such as the National Parents' Union and the Roman Catholic Church, which labeled the assemblymen who voted for the law as "sinners", and complained it was "vengeance against the Catholic Church from the more radical groups from the left, who felt it was a demand for justice." The law officially took effect on 16 March 2007. Mexico City's first same-sex civil union was performed between Jorge Cerpa Trejo, a 31-year-old economist, and Antonio Medina Velázquez, a 38-year-old journalist. By December 2009, 736 same-sex civil unions had taken place in the city, of which 24 (3%) had been annulled.

9 November 2006 vote in the Legislative Assembly
Party	Voted for	Voted against	Abstained	Absent (Did not vote)
Party of the Democratic Revolution	33: Ricardo Antonio León; Sergio Ávila Rojas; Juan Beltrán Cordero; Hipólito Bravo López; Juan Bustos Pascual; Nancy Cárdenas Sánchez; Sergio Cedillo Fernández; Esthela Damian Peralta; María Garfias Maldonado; Agustín Guerrero Castillo; Carlos Hernández Mirón; Víctor Hugo Círigo; Ramón Jiménez López; Antonio Lima Barrios; Salvador Martínez della Rocca; Avelino Méndez Rangel; Humberto Morgan Colón; José Morúa Jasso; Nazario Norberto Sánchez; Daniel Ordóñez Hernández; Edy Ortiz Piña; Tomás Pliego Calvo; Laura Piña Olmedo; Leticia Quezada Contreras; José Ramírez Pino; Daniel Salazar Núñez; Arturo Santana Alfaro; Miguel Sosa Tan; Mauricio Toledo Gutiérrez; Edgar Torres Baltazar; Enrique Vargas Anaya; Balfre Vargas Cortéz; Isaías Villa González	–	1: Samuel Hernández Abarca	–
National Action Party	–	16: Aldo Armas Pluma; Jacobo Bonilla Cedillo; Agustín Castilla Marroquín; Miguel Errasti Arango; Miguel Hernández Labastida; Kenia López Rabadán; Paz Quiñones Cornejo; Daniel Ramírez del Valle; Ezequiel Rétiz Gutiérrez; Jorge Romero Herrera; Celina Saavedra Ortega; María Segura Rangel; Paula Soto Maldonado; Jorge Triana Tena; Alfredo Vinalay Mora; José Zepeda Segura	–	1: Margarita Martínez Fisher
Institutional Revolutionary Party	4: Marco García Ayala; Armando González Case; Martín Olavarrieta Maldonado; Jorge Schiaffino Isunza	–	–	–
New Alliance Party	2: Rebeca Parada Ortega; Xiuh Tenorio Antiga	1: Fernando Espino Arévalo	1: Gloria Cañizo Cuevas	–
Ecologist Green Party of Mexico	–	–	3: Leonardo Álvarez Romo; Francisco Alvarado Villazón; María Peralta Vaqueiro	–
Social Democratic Party	2: Jorge Díaz Cuervo; Enrique Pérez Correa	–	–	–
Convergence	1: Raúl Ramírez Rodríguez	–	–	–
Labor Party	1: Juan García Hernández	–	–	–
Total	43	17	5	1
Total	65.2%	25.8%	7.6%	1.5%

== Same-sex marriage ==
=== Legislative action ===
On 24 November 2009, PRD Assemblyman David Razú Aznar proposed a bill to legalize same-sex marriage in Mexico City. According to Razú Aznar, "gays and lesbians pay taxes like everyone else, obey the law like everyone else, build the city like everyone else, and there is no reason they should have a different and special set of rules." The bill sought to modify the definition of marriage in the Civil Code using gender-neutral language. Razú Aznar added that the bill was "to be in agreement with Article 1 of the Constitution of Mexico, which says that no person can be discriminated against for any reason, and with Article 2 of the Civil Code, which says that no person can be deprived of the exercise of their rights for reasons of sexual orientation." Assemblyman Emiliano Aguilar Esquivel of the Institutional Revolutionary Party (PRI) was criticized for giving out homophobic pamphlets, which showed transgender prostitutes with the inscription "Lawmaker, would you like to see your children ending up like this? Do not promote homosexuality." Luis González Plascencia, chairman of the Human Rights Commission of Mexico City, backed the bill and said it was up to the Legislative Assembly to consider adoption rights. The International Lesbian, Gay, Bisexual, Trans and Intersex Association (ILGA), Amnesty International, the AIDS Healthcare Foundation and over 600 non-governmental organizations expressed support for the legalization of same-sex marriage in Mexico City. The National Action Party (PAN) announced it would either go to the courts to appeal the law or demand a referendum. However, a referendum on same-sex marriage was rejected by the Legislative Assembly in a 22–36 vote on 18 December 2009.

On 21 December 2009, the Assembly approved the legalization of same-sex marriage in a 39–20 vote. Head of Government Marcelo Ebrard had been expected to sign the bill. The legislation changed the definition of marriage in the Civil Code from "a free union between a man and a woman" to "a free union between two people". Article 146 of the Civil Code reads: Marriage is the free union between two people to establish a shared life, in which both provide one another with respect, equality, and mutual support. (Note: Spanish: Matrimonio es la unión libre de dos personas para realizar la comunidad de vida, en donde ambos se procuran respeto, igualdad y ayuda mutua.) The law was written to allow same-sex couples to adopt children, apply for bank loans, inherit wealth and be included in the insurance policies of their spouse, among other rights they were previously denied under the civil union law. PAN vowed to challenge the law in the courts. On 29 December 2009, Ebrard signed the bill into law, and it became effective on 4 March 2010. The first same-sex marriages were performed for five couples on 11 March at the administrative buildings in Cuauhtémoc. On 5 August 2010, the Supreme Court of Justice of the Nation voted 9–2 to uphold the constitutionality of Mexico City's same-sex marriage law. Five days later, it ruled that same-sex marriages performed in Mexico City must be recognized throughout the country.

21 December 2009 vote in the Legislative Assembly
Party	Voted for	Voted against	Abstained	Absent (Did not vote)
Party of the Democratic Revolution	34: Claudia Águila Torres; Aleida Alavez Ruíz; María Amaya Reyes; María Barrales Magdaleno; Rocío Barrera Badillo; Valentina Batres Guadarrama; Alejandro Carbajal González; Maricela Contreras Julián; Fernando Cuellar Reyes; Erasto Ensástiga Santiago; Adoldo González Monzón; Héctor Guijosa Mora; Armando Jiménez Hernández; Juan Larios Méndez; Alejandro López Villanueva; Leonel Luna Estrada; José Maldonado Salgado; Horacio Martínez Meza; Carlos Morales López; Julio Moreno Rivera; José Muñóz Soria; Guillermo Orozco Loreto; Karen Quiroga Anguiano; María Razo Vázquez; David Razú Aznar; Maximiliano Reyes Zúñiga; Beatriz Rojas Martínez; Víctor Romo Guerra; Lizbeth Rosas Montero; Edith Ruíz Mendicuti; Alejandro Sánchez Camacho; Guillermo Sánchez Torres; Abril Trujillo Vázquez; Víctor Varela López	–	–	–
National Action Party	–	15: Rafael Calderón Jiménez; Sergio Eguren Cornejo; Carlos Flores Gutiérrez; Mariana Gómez del Campo; José Gutiérrez Aguilar; Guillermo Huerta Ling; Lía Limón García; Federico Manzo Sarquis; Rafael Medina Pederzini; Jorge Palacios Arroyo; Carlo Pizano Salinas; José Rendón Oberhauser; Fernando Rodríguez Doval; Mauricio Tabe Echartea; Juan Zárraga Sarmiento	–	–
Institutional Revolutionary Party	–	2: Emiliano Aguilar Esquivel; Octavio West Silva	5: Israel Betanzos Cortes; Gilberto Sánchez Osorio; Fidel Suárez Vivanco; Alicia Téllez Sánchez; Leobardo Urbina Mosqueda	1: Alan Vargas Sánchez
Labor Party	4: Ana Aguirre y Juárez; José Benavides Castañeda; José López Cándido; Juan Pérez Mejía	–	–	1: Adolfo Orive Bellinger
Ecologist Green Party of Mexico	–	3: Jorge Couttolenc Guemez; Raúl Nava Vega; Norberto Solís Cruz	–	–
New Alliance Party	1: Axel Vázquez Burguette	–	–	–
Total	39	20	5	2
Total	59.1%	30.3%	7.6%	3.0%

On 11 December 2016, the Constituent Assembly of Mexico City, a body formed to create a constitution for Mexico City, voted 9–7 to include the right to same-sex marriage in the draft text. In early January 2017, the Constituent Assembly voted 68–11 in plenary to enshrine same-sex marriage in the Mexico City Constitution. Article 11(H)(2) of the Constitution reads:

- in Spanish: Se reconoce en igualdad de derechos a las familias formadas por parejas de personas LGBTTTI, con o sin hijas e hijos, que estén bajo la figura de matrimonio civil, concubinato o alguna otra unión civil.
- in Nahuatl: Mah amo quinixtlahuelitacan in nepapan tlacah ipampa imincihuayo nozo iminoquicho in yuh LGBTTTI, mah zan ihcuitic quipiacan iminnamic huan imincenyeliz, in tlaa quipiazque nozo amo quipiazque imimpilhuan itechcopa tlatlaman nenamictiliztli.

(Equal rights are recognized for families formed by LGBTTTI people, with or without children, who are under the figure of civil marriage, concubinage or some other civil union.)

=== Statistics ===
More than 270 same-sex couples married in Mexico City between March and July 2010. Around 6,000 same-sex marriages were performed in the city in the first five years following the law's enactment. 30% of the marriages were between couples from other states and only 2% had ended in divorce. The following table shows the number of same-sex marriages performed in Mexico City since legalization in 2010 as reported by the National Institute of Statistics and Geography. Figures for 2020 are lower than previous years because of the restrictions in place due to the COVID-19 pandemic.

Number of marriages performed in Mexico City
Year	Same-sex			Opposite-sex	Total	% same-sex
Year	Female	Male	Total	Opposite-sex	Total	% same-sex
2010	309	380	689	33,755	34,444	2.00%
2011	345	457	802	34,284	35,086	2.29%
2012	447	489	936	34,600	35,536	2.63%
2013	536	649	1,185	35,888	37,073	3.20%
2014	761	851	1,612	35,052	36,664	4.40%
2015	657	777	1,434	31,796	33,230	4.32%
2016	677	804	1,481	31,034	32,515	4.55%
2017	682	780	1,462	29,406	30,868	4.74%
2018	690	767	1,457	25,064	26,521	5.49%
2019	743	796	1,539	25,923	27,462	5.60%
2020	429	403	832	11,106	11,938	6.97%
2021	631	610	1,241	18,890	20,131	6.16%
2022	806	795	1,601	25,648	27,249	5.88%
2023	562	652	1,214	24,287	25,501	4.76%
2024	550	453	1,003	23,662	24,665	4.07%

== Public opinion ==
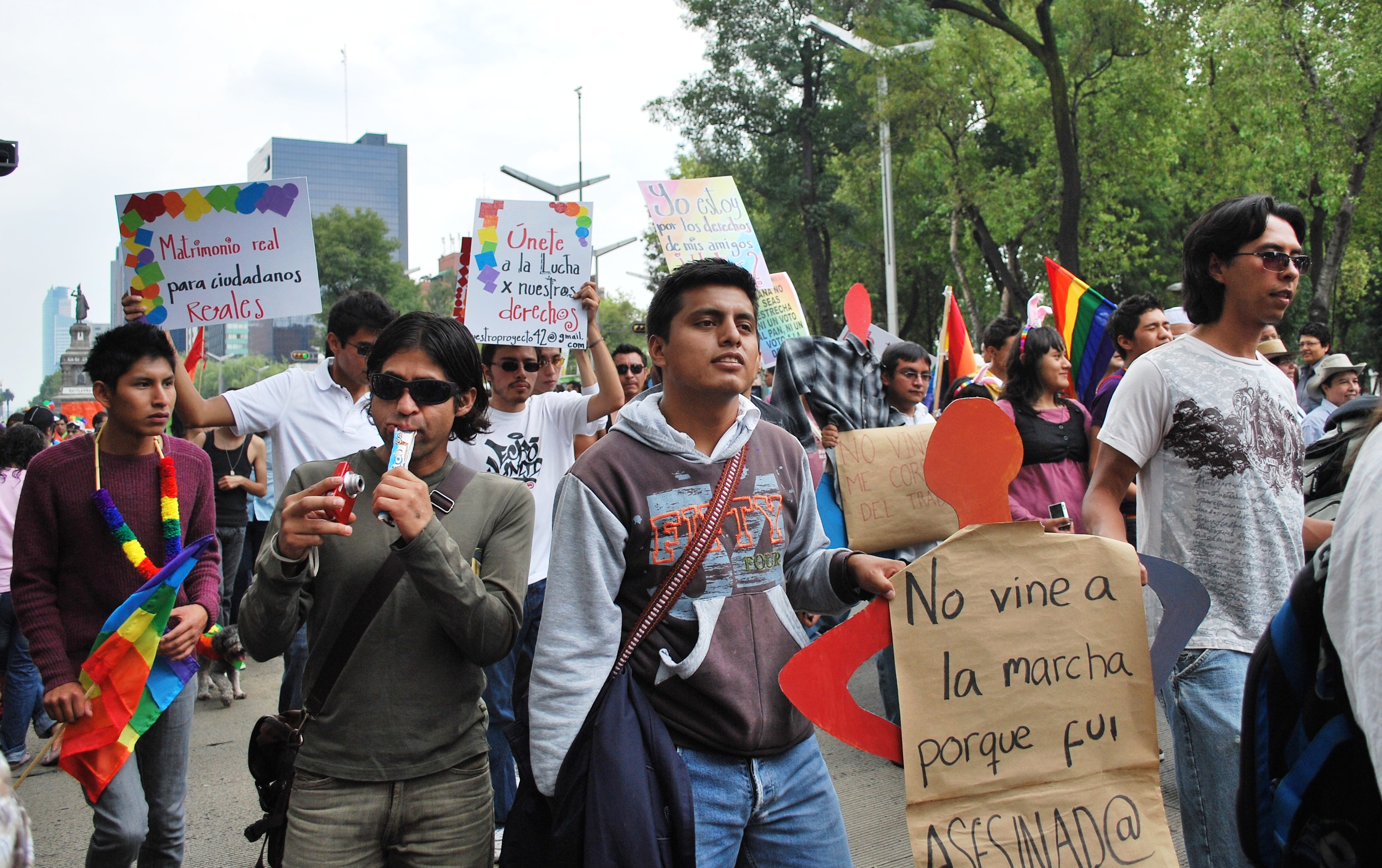
Protesters in favor of same-sex marriage at Mexico City Pride, June 2009

=== Opinion polls ===
An opinion poll conducted in September 2009 showed that the population of Mexico City was almost evenly divided on the issue of same-sex marriage, with 48% in favour and 46% against. In November 2009, major newspaper El Universal reported that, out of a sample of 1,000 Mexico City citizens, 50% supported same-sex marriage, 38% were against and 12% had no opinion. The same poll showed that support was stronger among the younger (18–29) population, 67%, and weaker among the oldest (50 and above), 38%. The most cited reasons for support were "right of choice" (48%), followed by "everybody is equal" (14%). 39% of opponents cited "it is not normal" as their main reason to oppose same-sex marriage, followed by "we lose values" at 18%.

A 2017 opinion poll conducted by the Strategic Communication Office (Gabinete de Comunicación Estratégica) found that 63% of Mexico City residents supported same-sex marriage, while 32% were opposed. According to a 2018 survey by the National Institute of Statistics and Geography, 29% of the Mexico City public opposed same-sex marriage, the lowest in all of Mexico.

=== Opposition ===
The National Action Party issued a statement calling the same-sex marriage bill "an electoral ploy by the PRD that mocks and abuses the LGBT community". The Roman Catholic Church strongly opposed the law when it was taken up by the Legislative Assembly, by calling same-sex marriage, among other things, "immoral", saying that marriage must hold the promise of procreation, "something that is possible only between a man and a woman". Armando Martínez Gómez, the president of a Catholic attorneys group, called on Head of Government Marcelo Ebrard to veto the bill, which Martínez Gómez noted went further than the city executive had intended when legislators removed a clause that would have forbidden adoption.

== See also ==
- LGBT rights in Mexico City
- Lesbian culture in Mexico City
- Same-sex marriage in Mexico
- LGBT rights in Mexico
