= Lesbian culture in Mexico City =

Lesbian social life, activism and arts in Mexico City

Lesbian culture in Mexico City covers the social life, organizations, activism, spaces and arts of lesbians and other queer women in Mexico City. The city has had public lesbian groups since 1977, a separate lesbian march since 2003 and a trans-inclusive "Marcha Lencha" since 2021. Lesbian nightlife has always been much smaller than the gay male scene, and much of it has been women's nights at mixed bars.

== History ==
=== Before 1970 ===
Little is written about lesbian life in the city before the 1970s. A 2025 history of the city's gay bars calls its own lesbian section incomplete and asks lesbians to write theirs. One early venue was El Safari, at the corner of Havre and Hamburgo in the Zona Rosa. Its north side, the "Cuadrante de Lesbos" (Lesbos quadrant), was for women, and Chavela Vargas sang there. The owner was Fernando Romero, head of the judicial police, and it closed in 1966.

=== 1970s ===
In 1971 the theater director Nancy Cárdenas co-founded the Frente de Liberación Homosexual (FLH), the country's first gay rights group. In 1973 she said she was a lesbian in an interview with Jacobo Zabludovsky on the TV news program 24 Horas, the first woman to come out on Mexican national television. In 1974 she directed Los chicos de la banda, a Spanish version of The Boys in the Band and Mexico's first gay play. (Note: Some sources date it to 1973 and say the cast was detained.)

The UN World Conference on Women met in the city in June and July 1975. Workshops on lesbianism at the parallel forum for non-governmental groups were the first public discussion of the subject in Mexico. Excélsior ran the headline "Defendían chicas de E.U. el homosexualismo" ("US girls defended homosexuality"), and an unsigned "Declaración de las lesbianas de México" (Declaration of the lesbians of Mexico) was handed to the forum's organizers. Claudia Hinojosa later attributed it to Cárdenas on the basis of its style. Cárdenas spoke at the forum after hearing that Mexican Communist women had walked out when an Australian delegate called herself a lesbian feminist, and neighborhood women picketed her session with signs telling "the lesbians and homosexuals" to leave. That August Cárdenas, Carlos Monsiváis and Luis González de Alba published the first manifesto in defense of homosexuals in Mexico, in La cultura en México, the cultural supplement of Siempre!.

In 1976 Marcela Olavarrieta founded Ákratas, an anarchist and separatist feminist group; it set up a commune in Tepoztlán. In 1977 Yan María Yaoyólotl Castro founded Lesbos, the first formal lesbian group. Its members kept their identities private. The group split in 1978 over whether to come out in public, and Castro founded Oikabeth, the first public lesbian, feminist and socialist organization in the country. The name is an acronym of a Maya phrase meaning "movement of warrior women who open the way and scatter flowers". The meetings were also social. One member called them "un nido para conseguir ligue" (a nest for finding dates). At the end of 1978 Oikabeth broke with the Frente Homosexual de Acción Revolucionaria (FHAR) over the sexism its members met from the men in it. Its fliers, and those of the Marxist lesbian groups that followed, showed women carrying rifles beside slogans that cast lesbians as true revolutionaries. The same year Hinojosa co-founded the mixed Grupo Lambda de Liberación Homosexual.

The FHAR first marched as a contingent on 26 July 1978, at a march for the Cuban Revolution. On 2 October 1978 lesbians and gay men marched as an open contingent at the tenth anniversary of the Tlatelolco massacre. On 29 June 1979 Oikabeth, Lambda and the FHAR called the country's first Pride march. Estimates range from about 100 marchers to about 1,000. Police kept them off Paseo de la Reforma, so they used Lerma street. In March 1980 the three groups went into the Basilica of Our Lady of Guadalupe in protest.

=== 1980s ===
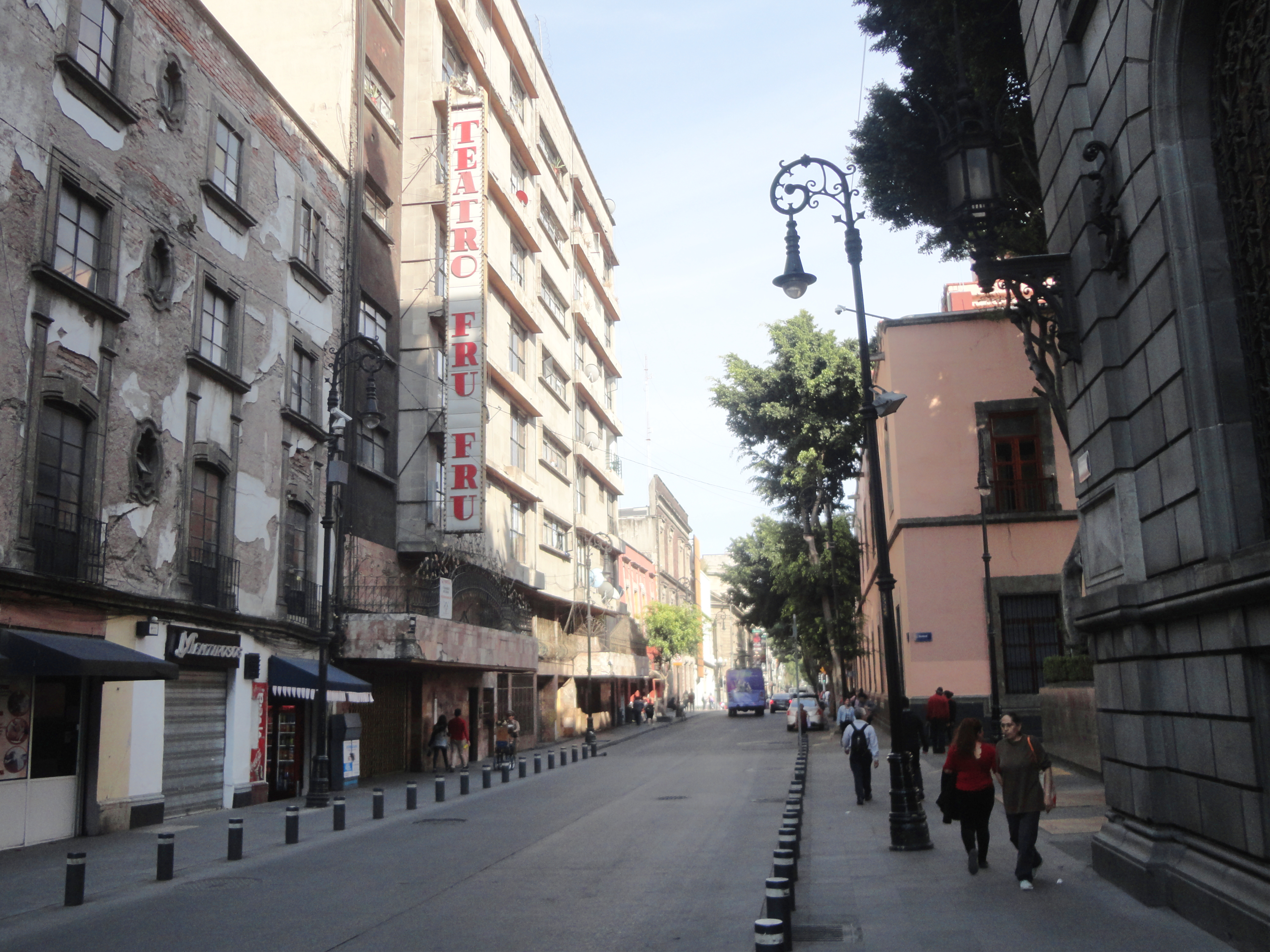
Teatro Fru Fru on Donceles, where Cárdenas and Irma Serrano staged El pozo de la soledad in 1984

Oikabeth split again in the early 1980s. Castro left after a dispute with Patria Jiménez, whose faction became Lesbianas Socialistas, and in 1984 she started the Seminario Marxista Leninista Feminista de Lesbianas, a study circle. After the 1985 earthquake the Seminario joined the relief work and marched in support of the striking seamstresses. Lambda broke up in 1985. In 1984 Cárdenas and Irma Serrano staged El pozo de la soledad, from Radclyffe Hall's The Well of Loneliness, at the Teatro Fru Fru. In 1982 lesbians and gay men formed a committee to back Rosario Ibarra of the Workers' Revolutionary Party in that year's presidential election, and a national coordinating body of lesbian feminists was set up in late 1987.

From 14 to 17 October 1987 about 250 women met at a hacienda near Cuernavaca for the first Latin American and Caribbean lesbian feminist encuentro, with buses from Mexico City. The same year the Museo Universitario del Chopo held its first Semana Cultural Lésbica Gay, now the Festival Internacional por la Diversidad Sexual.

=== 1990s ===
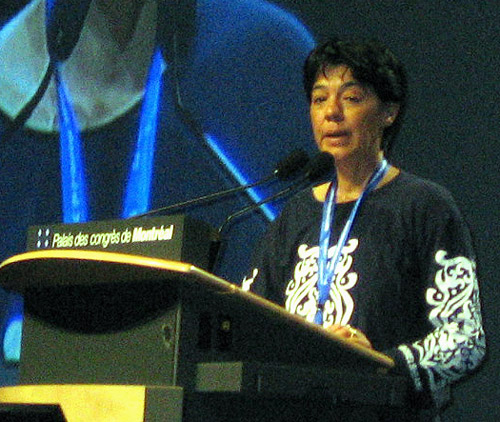
Patria Jiménez in Montreal, 2006

In November 1991 Chavela Vargas, then 72, returned to the stage after 13 years at El Hábito in Coyoacán, the cabaret run by Jesusa Rodríguez and Liliana Felipe. Cárdenas died in the city on 23 March 1994.

El Clóset de Sor Juana was founded in 1992 by Gloria Careaga and 15 other women. It grew out of the group that backed Patria Jiménez's 1991 run for Congress. In 1997 Jiménez was elected to the Chamber of Deputies on the Party of the Democratic Revolution list, the first openly gay or lesbian member of a national legislature in Latin America. Musas de Metal, a group of "mujeres gay", started in 1995, and Nueva Generación de Jóvenes Lesbianas in 1996.

== Archives ==
The Centro de Documentación y Archivo Histórico Lésbico "Nancy Cárdenas" (CDAHL) was put together in 1995, after Cárdenas's death; in 2003 it was located in colonia Del Parque. In 2012 the researcher Norma Mogrovejo transferred it to the CAMeNA library of the Universidad Autónoma de la Ciudad de México.

Yan María Yaoyólotl Castro keeps the Archivo Histórico del Movimiento Feminista de Lesbianas en México, about 9,000 documents from 1976 to 2020. Part of it was shown in 2018 as Laberintos inexplorados. Entre la misoginia y la lesbofobia (Unexplored labyrinths: between misogyny and lesbophobia) at the Galería José María Velasco in colonia Morelos.

== Marches and observances ==
=== Marcha Lésbica ===
The Comité Organizador de la Marcha Lésbica (COMAL) was set up in November 2002, and the first Marcha Lésbica, on 21 March 2003, went from the Monumento a la Revolución to the Zócalo. The idea came from Norma Mogrovejo and Chuy Tinoco between 1998 and 2002, and COMAL was led by Mariana Pérez Ocaña and Juana Guzmán Lisea of the lesbian publisher LeSVOZ. Twelve lesbian feminist groups took part. Organizers counted more than 2,500 marchers, and at the end there was a burning of bras and pantyhose. It was paid for partly with about US$4,000 from the Global Fund for Women. In March 2004 staff of the city's women's institute, Inmujeres-DF, removed the LeSVOZ information table, and in 2006 the interim mayor Alejandro Encinas did not let the march end at the cathedral. There were further marches in 2009, 2011 and 2013, and by 2013 the organizers said they could afford it only every other year. The sixth march, on 16 March 2013, went the other way, from the Zócalo to the Monumento, led by Norma Andrade of Nuestras Hijas de Regreso a Casa. Official figures put the turnout at about 1,500; organizer Mariana Pérez Ocaña said 5,000 to 7,000. Its slogan was "La revolución será lesbiana feminista o no será" (the revolution will be lesbian feminist or it will not be). The march uses purple rather than the rainbow flag and its organizers call it anti-queer. Gómez García treats 2013 as the end of the series, with LeSVOZ carrying most of the work alone.

Opposition to trans inclusion goes back at least to 2006, when Castro, who joined COMAL that year, wrote against including trans people; a 2004 lesbian feminist encuentro had already argued against trans and queer identities. Its posters long said "solo mujeres" (women only). The call for the 2019 march said "Solo mujeres biológicas" (biological women only) and rejected the LGBT and queer framing. Trans-inclusive lesbians criticized the call as trans-exclusionary, and the Marcha Lencha was organized partly in response.

=== Marcha Lencha ===
The 2024 Marcha Lencha at the Monumento a la Revolución

The first Marcha Lencha, on 19 June 2021, went from the Glorieta de los Insurgentes to the bar La Cañita. It was modeled on dyke marches and open to trans and non-binary people, and took its name from lencha, a slur its organizers set out to reclaim. A few hundred people took part. It has been held every June since, a week before the main Pride march: in 2022 from the Glorieta de las Mujeres que Luchan to Chapultepec, and from 2023 on from the Angel of Independence to the Monumento a la Revolución. The sixth was on 20 June 2026.

=== Observances ===
The city marks Lesbian Visibility Day on 26 April. In 2019 the city's human rights commission said 68 percent of lesbians reported discrimination, and two in three had hidden their orientation in job interviews. In 2022 the city government held events at the Glorieta de Insurgentes, including the exhibition Anecdotario lencho, and showed lesbian short films at the Centro Cultural El Rule. The Día de las Rebeldías Lésbicas (Day of Lesbian Rebellions) on 13 October comes from the 2007 Latin American lesbian feminist encuentro in Chile. At its 2015 observance the city's social development department announced a study of discrimination against lesbians with UNAM and Musas de Metal.

== Family and law ==
A women's couple at the 2009 Pride march

Same-sex marriage has been legal in the city since 4 March 2010. The first weddings were on 11 March 2010 at the old city hall. Among the first couples were Judith Vázquez and Lol Kin Castañeda, and Janice Alva Vázquez and Emma Laura Villanueva; Liliana Felipe and Jesusa Rodríguez signed later that day, after a delayed flight. By March 2021 the city had registered 13,134 same-sex marriages, 6,137 of them between women.

Civil registry offices at first turned away couples who wanted to register a child with two mothers. The early registrations needed help from the human rights commission or the anti-discrimination council (COPRED). From August 2013 children of lesbian couples were recognized, with the Red de Madres Lesbianas (lesbian mothers' network). In 2015 a child born in 2014 was registered in both mothers' names after a complaint, and in 2017 an Iztapalapa registry judge still asked a married couple for the biological father. In 2018 the commission said the civil code still needed changing. A group of lesbian mothers, Mamás Les, was active in 2013.

== Violence and discrimination ==
On 2 July 2022 two women were hit with a brick while kissing in Coyoacán. Women then protested at Semujeres, the city's women's department, which admitted it had no programs aimed at violence against lesbian and bisexual women. Weeks earlier, in June, a lesbian couple was thrown out of the Reforma 222 mall. That too led to a protest, and to complaints to COPRED. In March 2023 Isabel Herrera de la Cruz, her partner Concepción González Canales and Isabel's two young sons were killed in Gustavo A. Madero; prosecutors said relatives killed them to get the family's property. In the 2021 national survey on sexual and gender diversity (ENDISEG), 11.2 percent of lesbian women in Mexico said their parents or relatives had tried to "correct" their orientation.

== Nightlife and spaces ==
=== Bars and parties ===
From the early 1970s to the late 1990s El Don, at Álvaro Obregón and Córdoba in Colonia Roma, went from a mixed cantina to a women-only bar; Gina's Place on Avenida Oaxaca did the same. In the '90s El Enigma was popular with working-class and middle-class women. The singer Manoella Torres sometimes performed there. The bar Anyway, at Monterrey 47 in Roma (mid-1990s to 2005), had separate spaces for women and men. In the 2000s Lipstick, at Amberes 1 on the corner of Reforma, had a "Jueves Lésbico" (lesbian Thursday) upstairs. The building is now Kinky, which kept the Thursdays. Botas Bar, on Niza in the Zona Rosa, opened around 2008 with women upstairs, drag shows on a small stage, and men downstairs. Clit Party was a women-only Thursday at Artic Bar.

In 2023 Time Out listed Cabaretito Fusión, Kinky, Bonbon in the Condesa, Guilt in Lomas de Chapultepec and Casa Gomorra in Colonia Obrera as lesbian-friendly bars. In April 2023 the Cuauhtémoc borough shut the Zona Rosa Cabaretito after complaints of fights and assaults. There are also roving parties: La Zona in Roma, LILA in Coyoacán in 2019, and Lilith's, a collective that throws women-only parties, in the 2020s.

La Cañita, a seafood bar at Doctor Andrade 24 in Colonia Doctores, opened in December 2017. It belongs to the writer Diana J. Torres and the musician Ali Gua Gua, of Las Ultrasónicas and Kumbia Queers. In May 2019 men attacked staff and customers there; Agencia Presentes called it an anti-LGBT attack.

=== Community spaces ===
La Comuna Lencha-Trans, in Santa María la Ribera, opened in January 2020 as a community kitchen, run by lesbian and trans women who also live there. It closed during the COVID-19 pandemic and reopened in May 2021, with a Friday "lesbotanero", a film club and workshops. It takes no money from the state or political parties. Cis men are not welcome. Punto Gozadera, a feminist cultural center and vegetarian restaurant on Plaza San Juan in the historic center, opened around 2015 and held women-only "lesbviernes" (lesbian Fridays). Punto Gozadera, like many independent community spaces affected by the lockdowns, closed in 2021. There are also meeting places at Ágora Café in Roma and the Musas de Metal space on General Prim. Somos Voces, at Niza 23 in the Zona Rosa, opened in 2009 as the first bookstore in the country specializing in sexual diversity.

=== Sports ===
In 2013 women's fútbol rápido (five-a-side) teams played at the Deportivo Mina in Colonia Guerrero, and the seventh lesbian basketball tournament was held at the Deportivo 5 de Mayo in Tlatelolco. The second International Lesbian Festival was held in Coyoacán in July 2013. The third, in August 2014, included a soccer tournament; nearly 20 groups criticized it as machista.

== Media ==
Rotmi Enciso in 2013

The fanzine Himen started in 1994 and the magazine LeSVOZ, called the country's first lesbian feminist magazine, in 1996. Both were run by Mariana Pérez Ocaña and Juana Guzmán Lisea; LeSVOZ was sold in Mexico City, Guadalajara and Tijuana and has put out 52 issues and more than 20 books. Pérez Ocaña also coordinated the 2013 Marcha Lésbica. The photographer and video artist Rotmi Enciso photographed Cárdenas and Vargas and made videos on lesbian life, among them Ellas/Nosotras. Masiosare (2006). Ana Francis Mor's El manual de la buena lesbiana began as a column in the magazine Emeequis.

== Arts ==
=== Literature ===
Amora (1989) by Rosamaría Roffiel, set among women sharing a house in Mexico City, is called the first lesbian feminist novel in Mexico. It was third in sales on release, behind Gabriel García Márquez and Laura Esquivel, but the publisher's manager held back the second printing because of its subject. Its 30th anniversary was marked at the Palacio de Bellas Artes in 2019. Artemisa Téllez's Fotografías instantáneas is a collection of lesbian stories set in the city in the 2000s. Alejandra Márquez's Lenchitudes (2026), a study of sapphic writing in contemporary Mexico, takes its title from the Marcha Lencha and starts with Amora.

=== Music ===
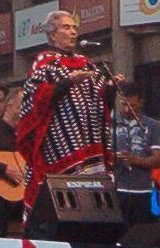
Chavela Vargas in concert, 2006

After Chavela Vargas's death in 2012 tributes were held with her body present in Plaza Garibaldi on 6 August and at Bellas Artes on 7 August. On 29 September 2024 Martí Batres unveiled a statue of her by Alfredo López Casanova in Plaza Garibaldi, inscribed "Les dejo de herencia, mi libertad" (I leave you my freedom as my legacy). Vargas said she lived for about a year with Frida Kahlo and Diego Rivera at the Casa Azul in Coyoacán, after meeting Kahlo at a party there, and she was long rumored to have had an affair with Kahlo. Catherine Gund, co-director of the 2017 documentary Chavela, said the length of the stay varied from one retelling to the next. There is also a letter in which Kahlo supposedly told the poet Carlos Pellicer she was attracted to Vargas. It was given to Vargas and printed in a 2009 biography, Dos vidas necesito: las verdades de Chavela, but the Museo Frida Kahlo and the critic Raquel Tibol doubted it was genuine. Las Ultrasónicas, a garage band with Ali Gua Gua, formed in the city in 1996.

=== Drag kings ===
Gabriel (Nancy Cázares) started as a drag king in October 2016 through the city's vogue balls, and at the time knew of only three others. Botas Bar had a small stage for drag shows on its women's floor.

=== Public figures ===
Jesusa Rodríguez in 2018

The producer Tina Galindo staged Cárdenas's Los chicos de la banda in 1974. In September 2023 the singer and actress Daniela Romo spoke publicly about her 44 years with Galindo. When Galindo died on 29 January 2024, at 78, Romo called her "mi compañera de vida" (my life partner). Jesusa Rodríguez and Liliana Felipe were among the first couples to marry in 2010. Joy Huerta of Jesse & Joy is open about her marriage to Diana Atri, with whom she had a daughter in 2019.

== Language ==
"Lesbiana no es un insulto, es un orgullo" (Lesbian is not an insult, it is a pride): placard at the 2025 Pride march

Lencha is the usual Mexican word for a lesbian, once an insult and since 2021 the name of the march. Chilango's "Lenchopedia mexicana" lists tortillera, machorra, lencha, zapatona, torta and volteada as insults that lesbians have started to reclaim, and ambiente as the older word for the LGBT scene. In the 1990s and early 2000s the usual terms in the city's lesbian circles were de ambiente and diversidad sexual, the sociologist Anahi Russo Garrido writes. Lesbiana came back in the 2010s, along with new coinages such as lesboterrorismo. In 2019 Facebook treated tortillera as hate speech, though in Mexico it also means a woman who makes tortillas.

== See also ==
- LGBTQ culture in Mexico City
- LGBTQ rights in Mexico City
- Same-sex marriage in Mexico City
- History of lesbianism
- Lesbian bar
