= LGBTQ rights in Mexico City =

Mexico City leads Mexico in LGBT rights, allowing same-sex marriage since 2010

- Mexico City (Mexico)
- Legal status: Legal since 1871
- Gender identity: Transgender people can change their legal gender and name since 2014
- Discrimination protections: Sexual orientation and gender identity protections

Family rights
- Recognition of relationships: Same-sex marriage since 2010
- Adoption: Full adoption rights since 2010

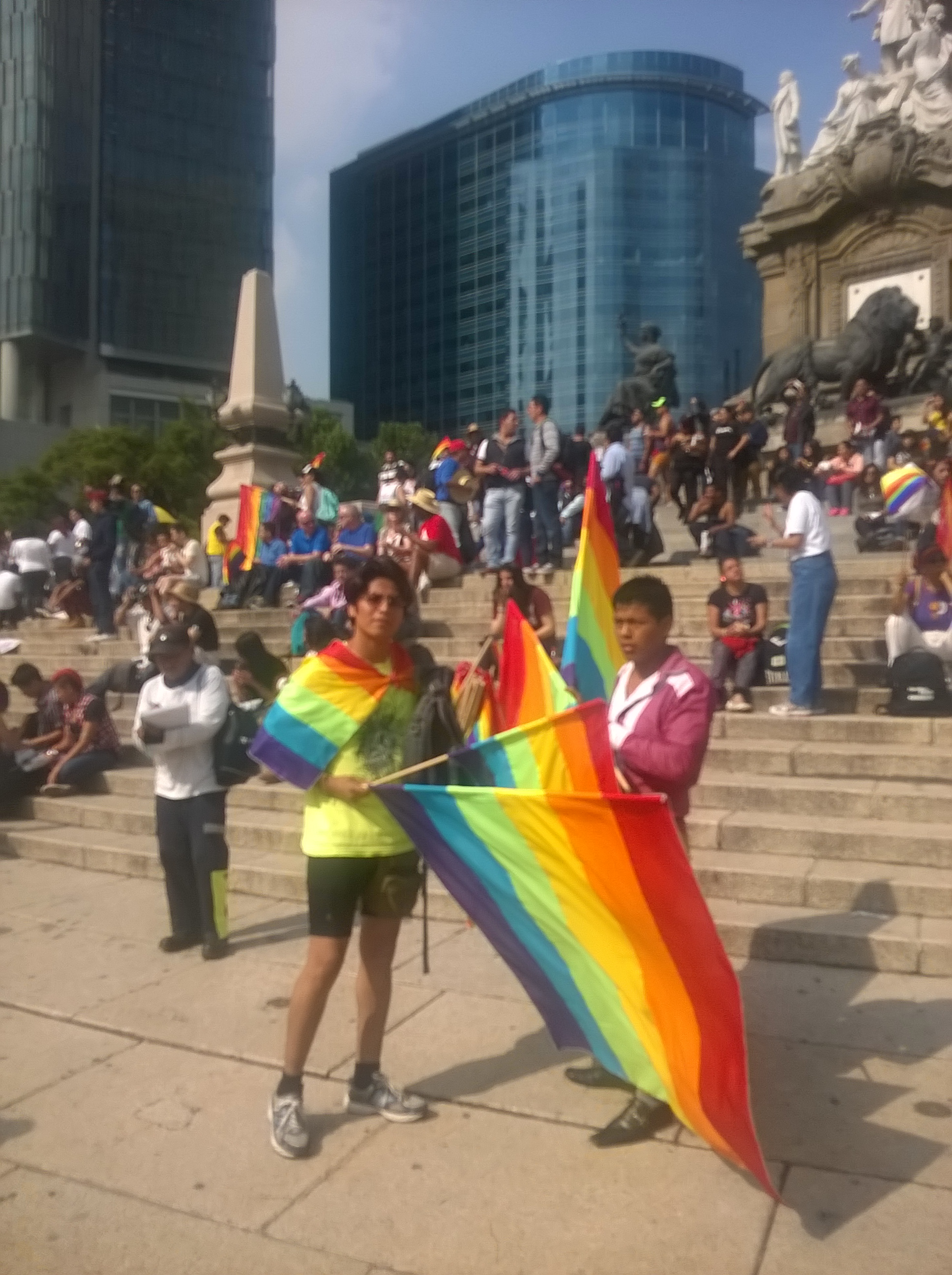
Mexico City Pride 2016

LGBT rights in Mexico City are considerably more progressive than the rest of Mexico. On March 4, 2010, it became the first area in Mexico to issue same-sex marriage licenses to same-sex couples.

== Legal status of homosexuality ==
Homosexuality is legal in Mexico City since the country's adoption of the Napoleonic Code (via the brief French occupation of Mexico (1862–67)). Effective in 2009, LGBT rights were legally enforced.

=== LGBT adoption ===
Joint legal adoption by same-sex couples is legal in Mexico City since 2010.

=== Changing legal gender ===
Transgender persons can change their legal gender and name in Mexico City since 2014.

== Recognition of same-sex unions ==
Same-sex marriage is legal in Mexico City, having been approved by its Legislative Assembly on 21 December 2009, and signed into law by Head of Government Marcelo Ebrard on 29 December 2009. The law was effective on 4 March 2010.

Civil unions, known as Sociedades de Convivencia and offering some of the rights of marriage, have been legal in the city since November 2006.

== Anti-LGBT violence ==
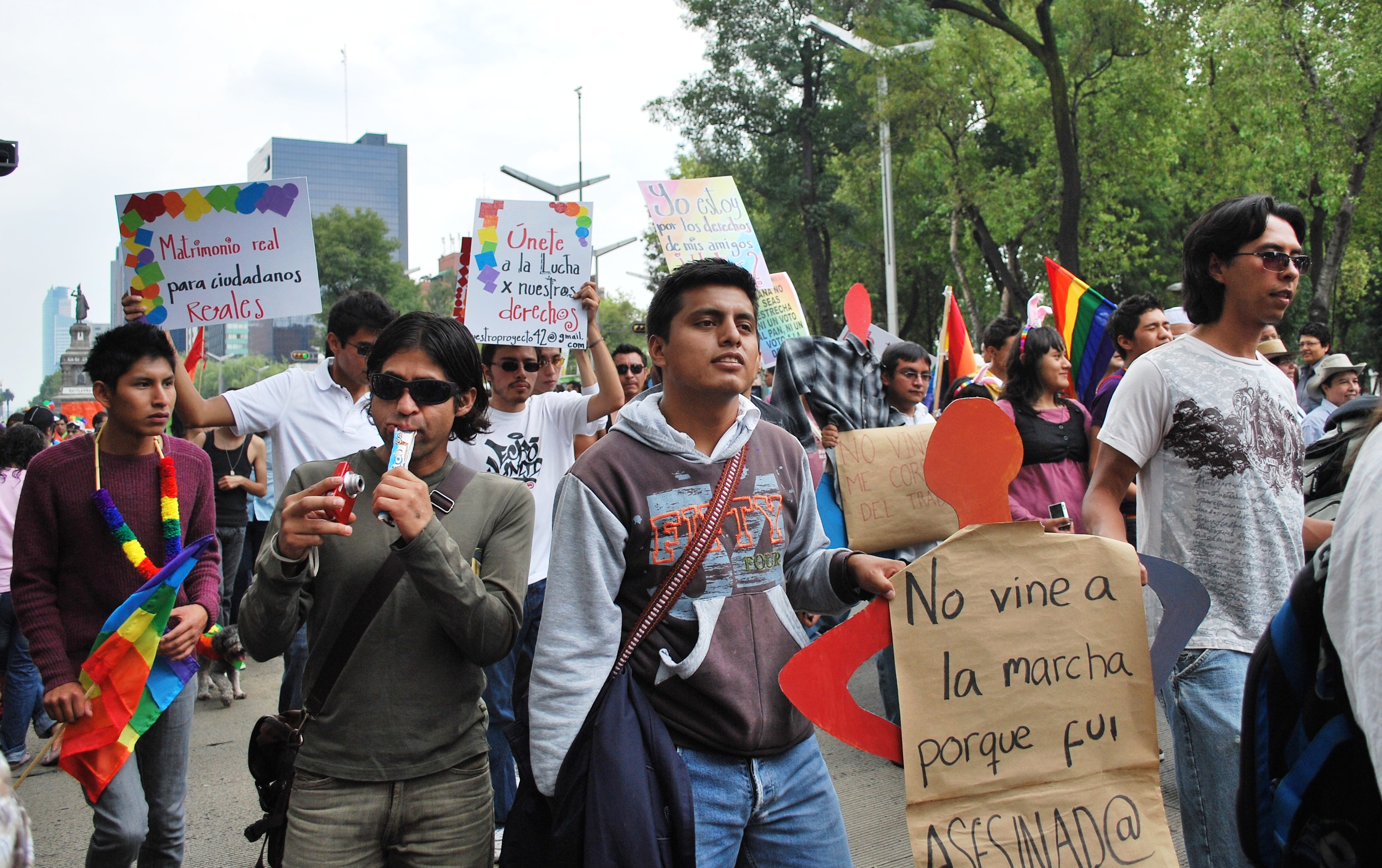
LGBT marchers denouncing hate crimes based on sexual orientation at 2009 LGBT Pride Parade in Mexico City.

Between 1995 and 2005, 126 homosexuals were murdered in Mexico City. Of those, 75 percent were reclaimed by their families. In 10 percent of the cases, families identified the victim but did not reclaim their bodies (which were buried in common graves) and the remaining 5 percent were never identified.

2007 ratings shared that Mexico was the second-highest rated country for homophobic crimes. Former assistant attorney for crime victims at the Federal District Attorney General's Office (PGJDF) Barbara Illan Rondero strongly criticized the lack of sensitivity and professionalism on the part of investigators in crimes committed against homosexuals and lesbians:

"I still can't determine if this is due to negligence, lack of preparation or down-right covering up and is a matter that has to do with the intention of not solving these crimes because they carry no weight of importance".

Alejandro Brito Lemus, director of the news supplement Letra S ("Letter S"), claimed that only four percent of gays and lesbians who suffer from discrimination present their complaints to authorities:

"In spite of the gravity of the aggressions suffered, the majority of gays, lesbians and transsexuals prefer to keep silent about what happens and to remain isolated in fear of being attacked again in revealing their sexual orientation".

Machismo is a very common gender norm issue in Mexico. The hate crimes that have spread to Mexico City show an alarming connection to hate crimes; more specifically in those identified as transgender women. In the range of 2019–2022, the National Observatory of Hate Crimes against LGBTI+ Persons in Mexico indicated reports of 305 hate crimes (violent rated) against sexual minorities. These rates are also in connection with Mexico City. The people in the country and Mexico city have called for justice in these crimes, demanding further investigations.

On November 14, 2023, LGBT activist Jesus Ociel Baena, died in Aguascalientes, Mexico. Baena was recognized for breaking barries as the first person in the country of Mexico let alone the City of Mexico to come share lawful issues of the LGBT community. With Brito's appearance in the following events related to Baena, chants were presented in Zocalo, honoring Baena and other LGBTI+ victims due to Anti-LGBT violence.

=== Conversion therapy Ban ===
Conversion therapy ban in Mexico City is an achievement that could have reached. Any medical professional residing in Mexico City who commit conversion therapy sessions can face up to 5 years of imprisonment. Mexico is one of the 16 countries in the world that has reached a partial agreement in terms of the banning of conversion therapy.

== El Ambiente ==
" El ambiente" is known to be an atomospheric environment for queer/LGBT individuals located in Mexico City. The part of Mexico City is known as "La Zona Rosa". In the English dictionary, el ambiente is translated as "the environment". El Ambiente is regrouped in 3 different ways: space, subculture and discreet mode of identification. El Ambiente is distinguishable in comparison to relation sets that take place with women, according to author and associate professor in Metropolitan State University of Denver Anahi Russo Garrido:

" Interviewees suggested that it was difficult to make it to el ambiente in the first place because of the relative invisibility of female same-sex sexuality and the lack of dissemination of spaces that exist for women".

Because of the obstacles Mexico City and women underwent throughout, this not only leads a social disassociation towards impacting the city rather it has also economically burden citizens. Not only is this movement towards El Ambiente shows women identification as hardworking, but also underrepresented due to lack of space participations.

=== Todo Mejora Project ===
The setbacks of El Ambiente adhered a diminish in 2014, when non-profit organization "Todo Mejora Mexico" (It gets better Mexico, in English) was introduced. El Ambiente provided a space for this organization to take more initiative to promote education on reformed gender norms Mexico encounters, along with safe spaces to promote visibility of the LGBT community. Widespreads of videos and social media campaigning, this project has launched a mass media of LGBT acceptance from Mexico City, spreading to various states of Mexico. According to a third-point of view from participants representing Fernanda Garza, one of the founders of Todo Mejora Mexico:

"A responsibility exists to do something. She spoke about the power of a simple YouTube video while coming to terms with her own identify as a lesbian, noting that the United States' "It Gets Better" project gave her hope, strength, and courage to accept her".

Although Todo Mejora Mexico has connections with addressing political issues and humanitarian education on the LGBT community, its connections with El Ambiente brighten a stronger media wave. It also aunched an "energy" for LGBT youth to initiate a wider spectra for the country to know that everyone should be proud for who they are. There were setbacks and challenges in delivering these messagers in the media due to machismo norms and anti-LGBT violence. Yet, this project with El Ambiente promoted LGBT community to find their union and promote further activism and "fight for a better world. Not just a better Mexico.".

== History of LGBTQ rights ==
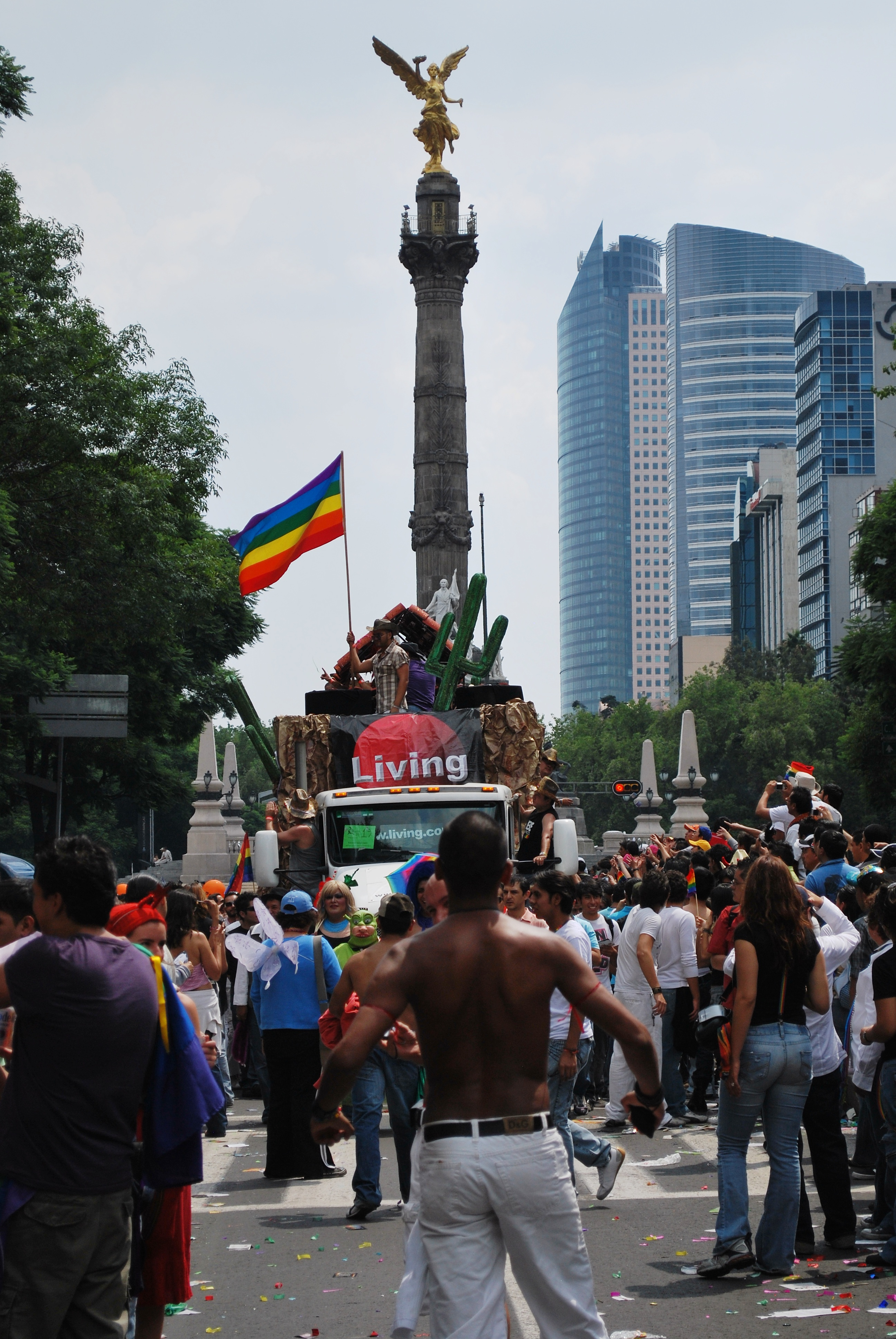
2009 LGBT Pride Parade in Mexico City. The first parade, in 1979 (also known as LGBT Pride March), attracted over 1,000 marchers.

- 1569: An official Inquisition (tribunal) was created in Mexico City by Philip II. Homosexuality was a prime concern and the Inquisition inflicted stiff fines, spiritual penances, public humiliations and floggings for what it deemed sexual sins.
- 1901 (20 November): Mexico City police raided an affluent drag ball, arresting 42 cross-dressed men; one was released, allegedly a close relative of President Porfirio Díaz. The resulting scandal (known as the "Dance of the 41 Maricones") received widespread press coverage.
- 1959: Mayor Ernesto Uruchurtu closed all gay bars in Mexico City under the guise of "cleaning up vice" (or reducing its visibility).
- 1979: The country's first LGBT Pride parade was held in Mexico City.
- 1999 (August): The First Meeting of Lesbians and Lesbian Feminists was held in Mexico City. From this meeting evolved an organized effort for expanded LGBT rights in the nation's capital.

September: Mexico City passed an ordinance banning discrimination based on sexual orientation, the first of its kind in the country.

- 2000: Enoé Uranga, an openly lesbian politician, proposed a bill which would have legalized same-sex civil unions in Mexico City. However, the local legislature decided not to adopt the bill after widespread opposition from right-wing groups.
- 2006 (9 November): Mexico City legalized same-sex civil unions.
- 2009 (21 December): Mexico City's Legislative Assembly passed a bill legalizing same-sex marriage and adoption by same-sex couples. Eight days later, List of heads of government of the Mexican Federal District (Mayor) Marcelo Ebrard signed the bill into law.
- 2010 (4 March): Same-sex marriage law becomes effective in Mexico City. Along with legal adoption to same-sex parents.

- 2010 (5 August): The Supreme Court of Justice of the Nation (the highest federal court in the country) voted 9–2 to uphold the constitutionality of Mexico City's same-sex marriage reform. Four days later it upheld the city's adoption law.
- 2014: Todo Mejora Mexico, an LGBTQ+ nonprofit organization was formed. The organization was founded by Fernanda Garza and Ruben Maza.
- 2014: changing gender role became legal to the city. See "Legal status of homosexuality" section.
- 2020 (31 July): Conversion therapies are banned in the city.

== Summary table ==
Same-sex sexual activity legal	Yes (Since 1871)
Equal age of consent (18)	Yes (Since 1871)
Anti-discrimination laws in employment	Yes (Since 2003)
Anti-discrimination laws in the provision of goods and services	Yes (Since 2003)
Anti-discrimination laws in all other areas	Yes (Since 2003)
Anti-discrimination laws covering gender identity or expression in all areas	Yes (Since 2003)
Hate crime laws include sexual orientation and gender identity	Yes
Same-sex marriage	Yes (Since 2010)
Recognition of same-sex couples	Yes (Since 2006)
Stepchild adoption by same-sex couples	Yes (Since 2010)
Joint adoption by same-sex couples	Yes (Since 2010)
Adoption by a single LGBTQ person	Yes
LGBTQ people allowed to serve openly in the military	Yes
Right to change legal gender	Yes (Since 2014)
Legal recognition of non-binary gender	Yes (Since 2025)
Access to IVF for lesbians	
Access to IVF for lesbians	Yes
Conversion therapy banned by law	Yes (Since 2020)
Commercial surrogacy for gay male couples	No
MSMs allowed to donate blood	Yes (Since 2012)

== See also ==
- LGBTQ culture in Mexico City
- Lesbian culture in Mexico City
