= Yan María Yaoyólotl Castro =

Mexican lesbian feminist (born 1952)

Yan María Yaoyólotl
- Born: 1952 (age 73–74); Mexico
- Education: Facultad de Filosofía y Letras, UNAM
- Occupations: Artist, Cultural Promoter, Curator, Activist, Lesbofeminist

Yan María Yaoyólotl (born 1952) is a Mexican lesbian feminist activist and a feminist artist, painter, curator and cultural promoter. She was co-founder of the groups Lesbos (1977) and Oikabeth (1978) which have their origins in the lesbian-feminist movement in Mexico.

== Biography ==
Named María de Lourdes at birth, she later took the Indigenous Maya name Yan and the Nahuatl Yaoyólotl as her last name. She studied philosophy at the National Autonomous University of Mexico (UNAM), with a specialization in aesthetics and politics (1973–1980).

=== Activist in the Lesbofeminist Movimiento ===
In 1977, she co-founded the group responsible for initiating the lesbian-feminist movement in Mexico: Lesbos, which had its precedent in Ácratas (1976), a group created a year before and which Yaoyólotl defines as "radical feminist, anarchist and separatist that proposed lesbian feminism." It was founded by Marcela Olavarrieta along with several other foreign feminists who did not want to enter public life and who worked in what was called "Small Self-Consciousness Groups." She continued in 1978 with Oikabeth I, which she also co-founded. In a 2018 interview with Luisa Velázquez Herrera, Yaoyólotl explains that Oikabeth was a member of the FHAR (Homosexual Front for Revolutionary Action) for three months, but after three months they left it, reaffirming the autonomy of the lesbian movement. In 1984, she split from Oikabeth and founded the Seminario Marxista-Leninista Feminista de Lesbianas, a group that declared itself to be socialist, in direct opposition to groups that split from FHAR and Oikabeth I, (which she viewed as "right wing") and tied itself to the Mexican Communist Party, Trotskyist organizations like PRT and independent unions from at that time: STUNAM and SITUAM.

In 2006 Yaoyólotl joined COMAL, the organizing committee of the Marcha Lesbica. She wrote against including trans people, and posters long said "solo mujeres" (women only). The call for the 2019 march said "Solo mujeres biológicas" (biological women only) and rejected lesbian participation in LGBT culture and queer framings. Trans-inclusive lesbians criticized the call as trans-exclusionary, and the Marcha Lencha (open to trans and non-binary people and modeled after dyke marches) was organized partly in response.

=== Artistic trajectory ===
Yaoyólotl developed her pictorial talent empirically.

In 1996, she co-founded ComuArte, A.C. (impulsed by Colectivo Mujeres en la Música, A.C., founded by the composer Leticia Armijo) opening up the Palace of Fine Arts' Adamo Boari Hall to contemporary Mexican visual artists. From 2002 to 2006, she was a co-founder and director of MujerArte A.C., a collective that addressed women's issues in relation to femicide in particular, as well as domestic violence, rape, abortion and sex work, among other issues.

Her artistic focus is based in ecofeminism, Indigenous world perceptions, lesbian feminism, socialist feminism and Mahayana Buddhism. She considers the creative act to be an integral part of social struggle for countries exploited by imperialism; the working class by classism; the original races and peoples due to racism and Westernization and, above all, women due to sexism. She has criticized neoliberal and postmodern art, placing her emphasis on the use of art as a form of either domination or emancipation.

Yaoyólotl was distinguished for her artistic organization of the events for International Women's Day and the International Day against Violence against Women in the Mexico City's Zócalo from 1998 to 2006, along with feminist organizations and government institutions.

== Political beliefs ==
In addition to her artistic activity, which has always been charged with political content, she has created political theory and criticism which forms part of lesbian feminism. She maintains a strong criticism of neoliberal policies both about the sexual diversity market and queer theories promoted by academia in Latin America. She also criticizes the misogyny of the gay movement. For Yan María "there can be no feminism without lesbianism or lesbianism without feminism. Lesbianism without feminism is blind, and feminism without lesbianism lacks content." This statement stems from the idea that lesbianism is a political stance, and not merely a sexual practice, but that it is a direct opposition to the oppression of women and an affirmation of the relationships between women as central, thus challenging androcentrism, building autonomy and breaking away from compulsory heterosexuality.

== Historical Archive of the Movement ==
Yan María Yaoyólotl safeguards the Historical Archive of the Feminist Lesbian Movement in Mexico, with 9,000 documents including posters, videos, photographs, manifestos, and other documents that span 40 years of activism of the lesbian-feminist movement in Mexico.

== See also ==
- LGBTQ culture in Mexico City
- Lesbian culture in Mexico City
