= Clara Jusidman =

Mexican economist

Clara Jusidman de Bialostozky is a Mexican social democrat economist and civic activist who served as Secretary of Social Development of the Mexican Federal District from 1998 to 2000 and as General Director of the National Electoral Register from 1996 to 1997.

Jusidman studied economy at the National Autonomous University of Mexico (UNAM). She has been a member of various Non-governmental organizations including Alianza Cívica, Incide Social A.C. and the "Comité Conciudadano para la Reforma Electoral". She has conducted scholarly investigations for the Bank of Mexico (Banco de México), El Colegio de México and the Office of the U.N. High Commissioner for Human Rights. She is specialized in social policy, economic, cultural and social rights and civil society. In 2004 she was designated by the Legislative Assembly of the Federal District as a member of the Federal District Human Rights Commission.
