= Nancy Cárdenas =

Mexican actor and activist

- Born: Nancy María Magdalena Cárdenas Martínez; May 29, 1934; Parras de la Fuente, Mexico
- Died: March 23, 1994 (aged 59); Mexico City, Mexico
- Education: National Autonomous University of Mexico
- Occupations: Poet, writer, actress, LGBT activist

Nancy María Magdalena Cárdenas Martínez (29 May 1934 – 23 March 1994) was a Mexican actress, poet, writer and feminist.

== Education ==
Born in Parras de la Fuente, Coahuila, Cárdenas earned a doctorate in Philosophy and Letters at the National Autonomous University of Mexico, studied staging, film and theater at Yale University in the United States and took courses in Polish language and culture in Łódź.

== Radio, theater and cinema ==
Nancy Cárdenas began as a radio announcer at the age of 20 years, then became a stage actress. In the 1950s she participated in the reading program, Poesía en Voz Alta ("Poetry Out Loud"), directed by Héctor Mendoza.

In the 1960s she switched to writing. She published her first one-act play, El cántaro seco (The Empty Pitcher), and began a career as a journalist for various magazines and on the culture pages of various newspapers.

In 1970 she worked as a theater director on El efecto de los rayos gamma sobre las caléndulas (The Effect of Gamma Rays on Marigolds), which won the Association of Theatre Critics Prize. She directed several successful plays, displaying certain political implications. She also wrote, along with Carlos Monsiváis, a documentary film, México de mis amores, and directed it herself in 1979.

From 1980 she devoted her time to writing plays and poetry. She died in Mexico City on March 23, 1994, of breast cancer.

== Sexuality ==
At age 39, Cárdenas became the first publicly declared lesbian in Mexico when she revealed her sexuality on the TV show 24 horas, hosted by Jacobo Zabludovsky, during an interview about the firing of a gay employee. In the 1970s, she pioneered the gay liberation movement in Mexico, elaborating on the subject in several television interviews.

She founded, in 1974, the first gay organization in Mexico, Frente de Liberación Homosexual Mexicano (FLHM; Mexican Homosexual Liberation Front). As a feminist and sexology specialist she also held numerous conferences, seminars and national and international television interviews on the subject. In 1975, along with Carlos Monsiváis, she wrote the Manifesto in Defense of Homosexuals in Mexico. On October 2, 1978, during the march in commemoration of the Tlatelolco massacre, she headed the first gay pride march in the Plaza de las Tres Culturas.

A center for gay and lesbian activities was named in her honor: the Nancy Cárdenas Latin American and Mexican Lesbian Documentation and Historical Archives Center (CDAHL).

== Works ==
=== Film ===
- México de mis amores (1979) (direction and photography – director with Carlos Monsiváis)

=== Theater ===
- El cántaro seco (The Empty Pitcher)
- Y la maestra bebe un poco (And the teacher drinks a bit)
- Los chicos de la banda de Matt Crowley (adaptation of Matt Crowley's Boys in the Band)
- Cuarteto (Foursome)
- Misterio bufo (Bouffe Mystery )
- La hiedra (Ivy)
- La casa de muñecas de Henrik Ibsen (Henrik Ibsen's Doll House)
- El pozo de la soledad de Radclyffe Hall (Radclyffe Hall's Well of Loneliness)
- Sida.... así es la vida (AIDS .... such is life)

=== Poetry ===
- Cuaderno de amor y desamor (1968–1993) (Book of love and hate)

== See also ==
- LGBTQ culture in Mexico City
- Lesbian culture in Mexico City
