= Nicho Bears and Bar =

Gay bar in Mexico City, Mexico

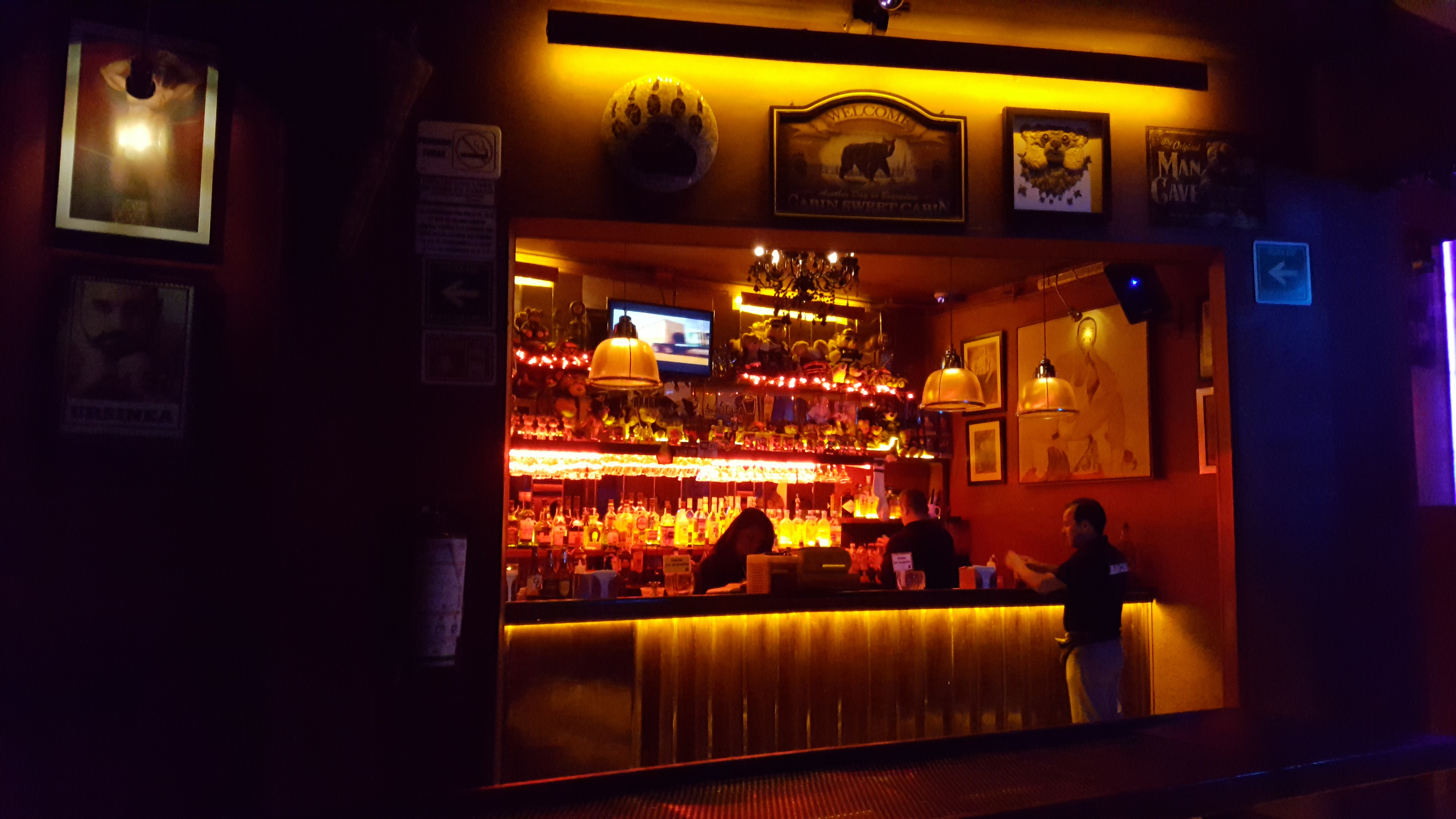
- Interior bar, 2018
- Interactive map of Nicho Bears and Bar
- Address: Londres 182, Juárez, Cuauhtémoc; Mexico City; Mexico
- Coordinates: 19.42423673228874°N 99.16615950635277°W

Nicho Bears and Bar is a gay bar in Zona Rosa, Mexico City, Mexico. Passport Magazine's Joseph Pedro said the bar offers "low-key bear night[s] where you're assigned numbers for secret messages". In 2018, Alberto Cervantes of TimeOut included Nicho in his list of the city's 10 best gay bars.

In 2020, the space was turned into a temporary bazaar of bear memorabilia. This was to support the staff who saw decreased wages due to the COVID-19 pandemic.

== See also ==
- LGBTQ culture in Mexico City
- List of LGBTQ bars
