= Claudia Hinojosa =

Mexican academic and activist

- Occupations: Academic, activist
- Organization: Lambda Group of Homosexual Liberation

Claudia Hinojosa is a Mexican academic and an LGBT and human rights activist. She is also noted for being one of the first openly gay candidates to run for Congress in Mexico. She also served as adviser to the Mexican politician, Enoe Uranga.

== Biography ==
Hinojosa co-founded the Lambda Group of Homosexual Liberation in 1978, alongside Xabier Lizárraga, Alma Aldana, and Max Mejía Solorio. It was one of the first lesbian and gay organization in Latin America. As a Lambda activist, she played an active role in the creation of a gay and lesbian commission that supported Lambda’s electoral candidates. In a statement in 1982, she maintained that the group did not see the Mexican parliament as a space for the liberation of gays and lesbians. Instead, it used the electoral space to talk about themselves and the need to organize and participate. Hence, in addition to campaign rallies, their electoral activities included public protests.

Hinojosa’s activism contributed to the development of broader debate questioning established norms of sexual behavior in Mexico. This discourse is considered crucial in the development of the Mexican LGBT movement. She pushed for the idea that the false dichotomy between the seriousness of the problem of poverty and the “frivolity” of sexuality, a problem that could be addressed by documenting the invisible links between these two areas manifested in different situations such as sexual exclusion and poverty; economic deprivation and sexual violence; and, compulsory heterosexuality and homophobia, among others.

Together with other lesbian activists such as Estela Suarez, Alejandra Rojas, and Rosalba Carrasco, Hinojosa worked with Uranga to help pass the Sociedad de Convivencia bill into law. She was also part of the cultural translation initiative covering women’s human rights at Rutgers University’s Center for Women’s Global Leadership. In 1979, she was a speaker at the Fourth World Congress of Sexology. Hinojosa also participated in the creation of Citizens Commission for Discrimination Studies, which was the predecessor of Mexico’s National Council for the Prevention of Discrimination. From 2004 to 2007, she was part of the consultative assembly of CONAPRED.

Hinojosa has one son.
