= Centro Cultural José Martí =

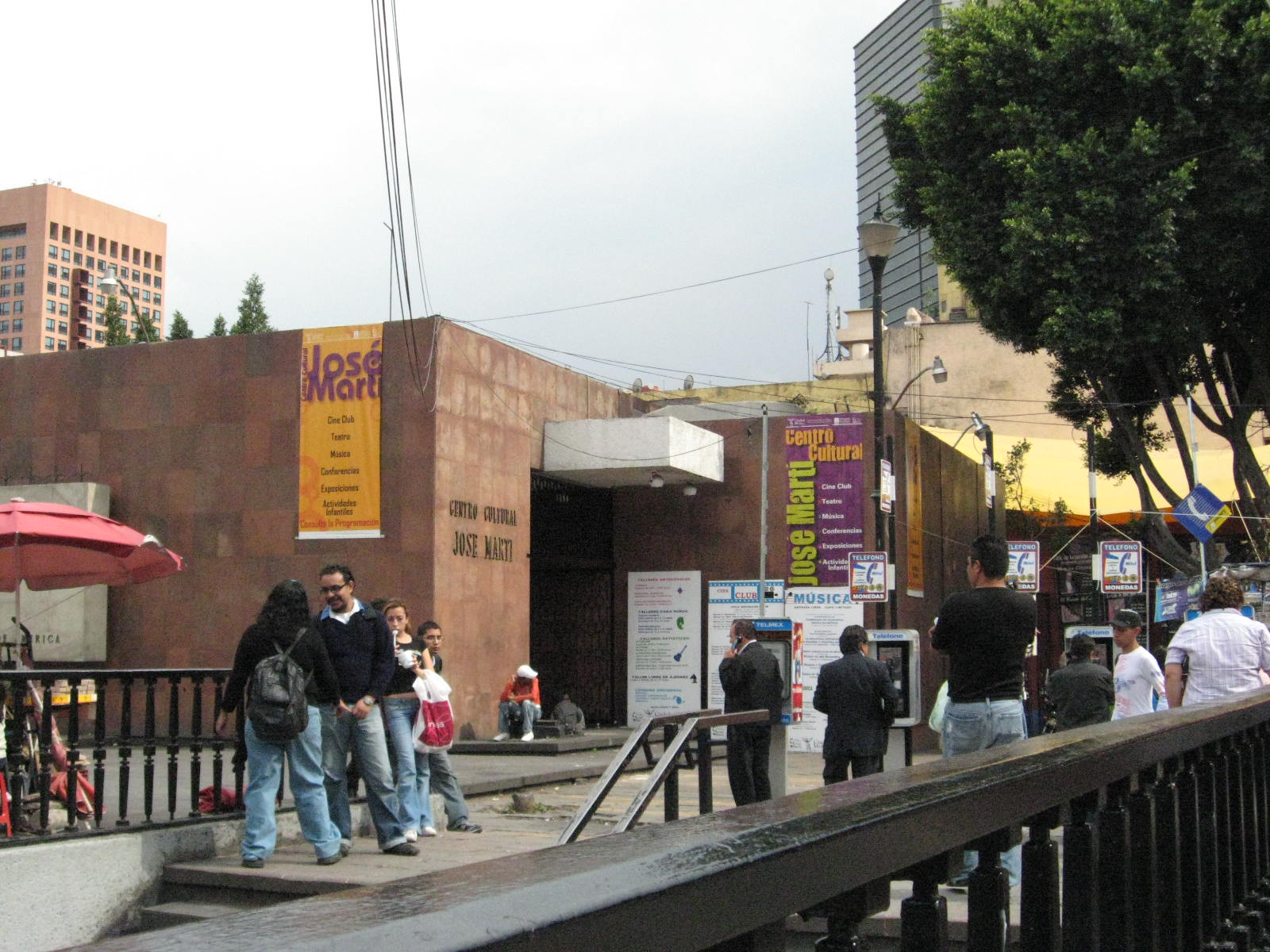
- The center's exterior in 2008
- Location in Mexico City

General information
- Status: Completed
- Type: Cultural center
- Location: Hidalgo Avenue and Paseo de la Reforma
- Coordinates: 19°26′13″N 99°08′47″W

The Centro Cultural José Martí is a cultural center in Mexico City, Mexico.
