= Frente de Liberación Homosexual (Mexico) =

LGBT rights advocacy organization

The Frente de Liberación Homosexual (Spanish: Homosexual Liberation Front or FLH), was the first public organization for gay liberation in Mexico. It was led and cofounded by lesbian activist Nancy Cárdenas in 1971.

== History ==
In the early 1970s, after the Stonewall riots, a group of people from different sexual diversities began regular meetings in Mexico City to discuss the oppressive situation they lived. Among them were actress and activist Nancy Cárdenas and writer and student activist Luis González de Alba. Carlos Monsiváis gave Cárdenas documents from the American Gay Liberation Front, motivating Cárdenas to found a formal group. She organized formal meetings that raise awareness among others about the importance of sexual diversity in the Mexican society. Some of the members of these circle had participated in social movements such as the Mexican Movement of 1968.

As a result of these meetings, the FLH was founded on August 15, 1971, in Mexico City. Meetings was conducted as a secret space given the repressive reception to social movements under the government of Luis Echeverría and homophobic behaviors in Mexican society. FLH activities included exercises of self-acceptance and recognition of individual and collective sexual diversity. The group was dissolved in 1973.
