= Henri Donnadieu =

French born-Mexican businessman and civil rights activist (1943–2025)

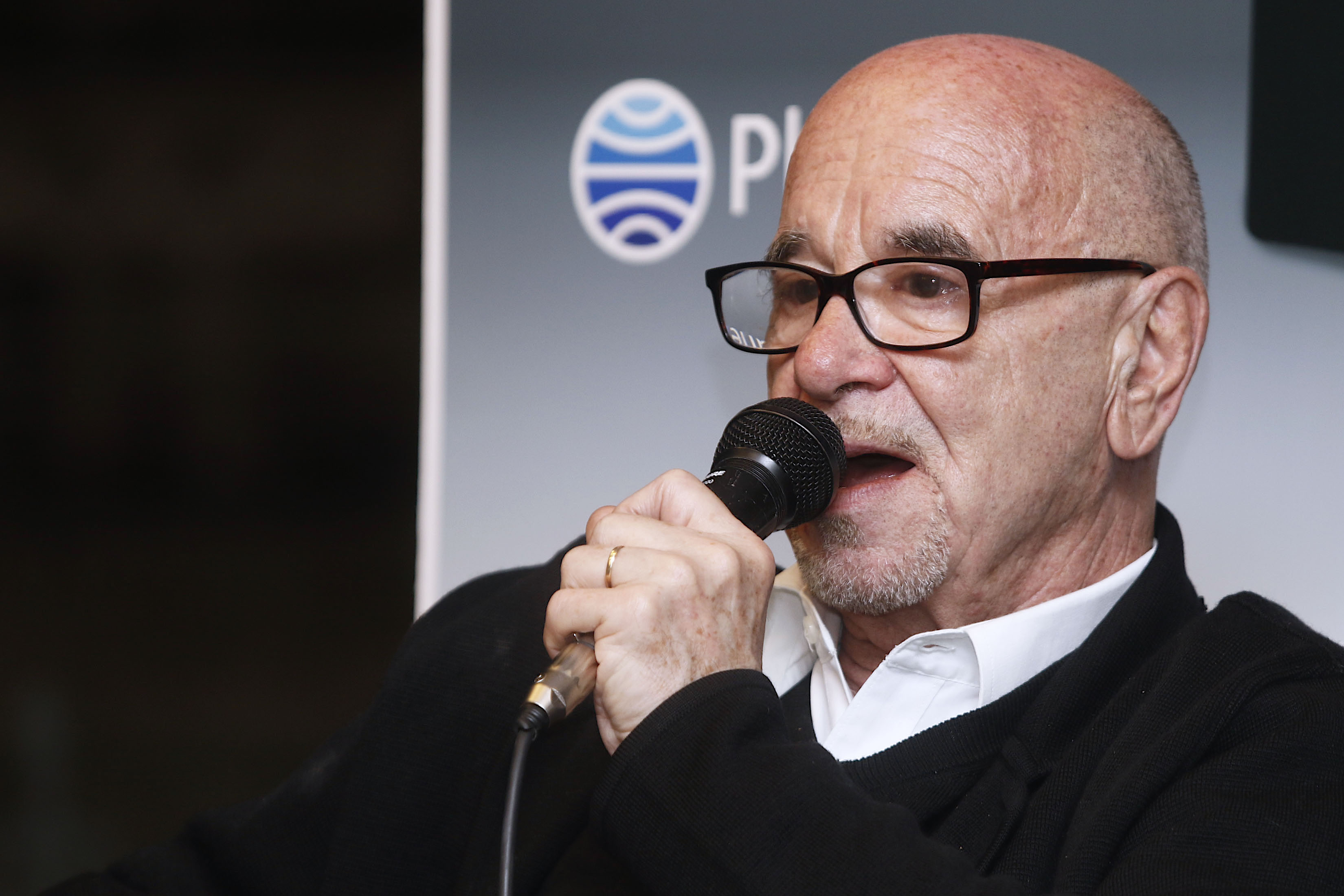
Donnadieu in 2019

Henri Donnadieu (13 May 1943 – 12 August 2025) was a Mexican-French businessman and LGBT rights activist.

== Life and career ==
Donnadieu was born in the French Riviera on 13 May 1943. He studied political science at the Sorbonne University. He later lived in Australia and New Caledonia, where he founded the Anti-Racial Union Party. In 1976 he migrated to Mexico as a political refugee, where he met Manolo Fernández, owner of the French restaurant Le Neuf located in Mexico City's Zona Rosa.

In 1977, the couple opened El Nueve, Mexico's first openly gay bar, on the premises of Fernández's former restaurant. The place attracted various Mexican personalities, such as Silvia Pinal, Pita Amor, Carlos Monsiváis, and María Félix, and became a safe space for the gay community of the Mexican capital.

Donnadieu died at his home in Cuernavaca, on 12 August 2025, at the age of 82.
