= Wenceslao Bruciaga =

Mexican author and journalist

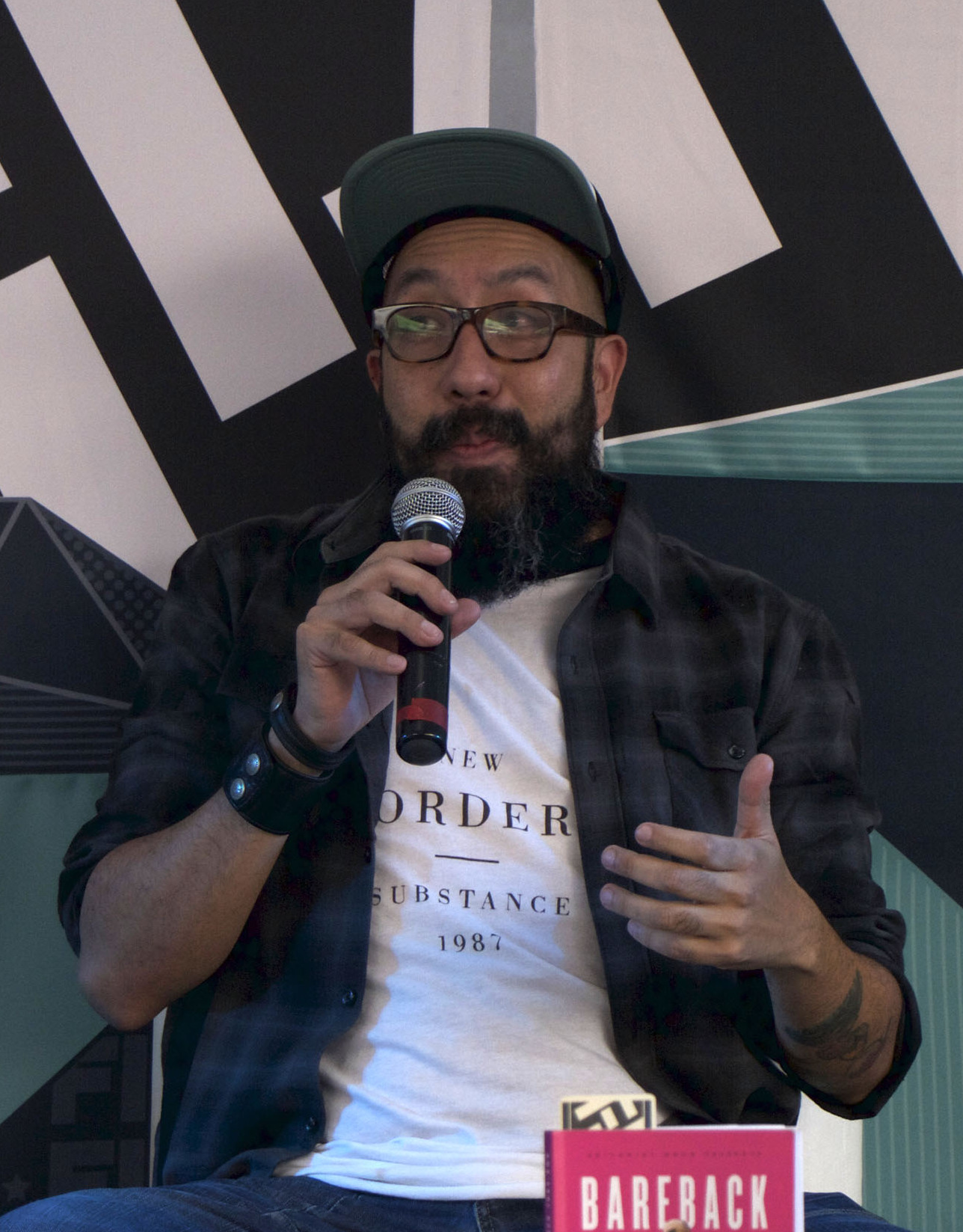
- Wenceslao Bruciaga in 2017
- Born: 1977 (age 48–49); Torreón, Mexico
- Occupations: Writer and journalist
- Notable work: Bareback Jukebox

Wenceslao Bruciaga (born 1977) is a Mexican writer and journalist. His literary work centers on exploring underground gay culture in U.S. cities like San Francisco and New York, as well as in Mexico City.

As a columnist, he has collaborated with media outlets like Milenio and publications like Vice, Time Out, and Día Siete. He has interviewed artists like Henry Rollins, John Lydon, and Courtney Love.

== Literary career ==
Bruciaga debuted with the short story collection Tu lagunero no vuelve más (English: Your Lagoon is Not Coming Back), published by Moho in 2000. Bruciaga followed this with the novel Funerales de hombres raros (2012; Funerals for Strange Men), which won the Torreón City Council's literary competition. The work explores the life of a group of homosexual friends and the effect that one of their member's suicides has on them, such as the protagonist traveling to his grandmother's funeral.

In 2016, he published a book of columns and opinion pieces called Un amigo para la orgía del fin del mundo (A Friend for the Orgy at the End of the World), in which he criticizes some aspects of queer activism including what he considers to be the "commercialization" of pride, and the fight for marriage equality, which Bruciaga describes as a conservative instruction that replicates the heterosexual family model.

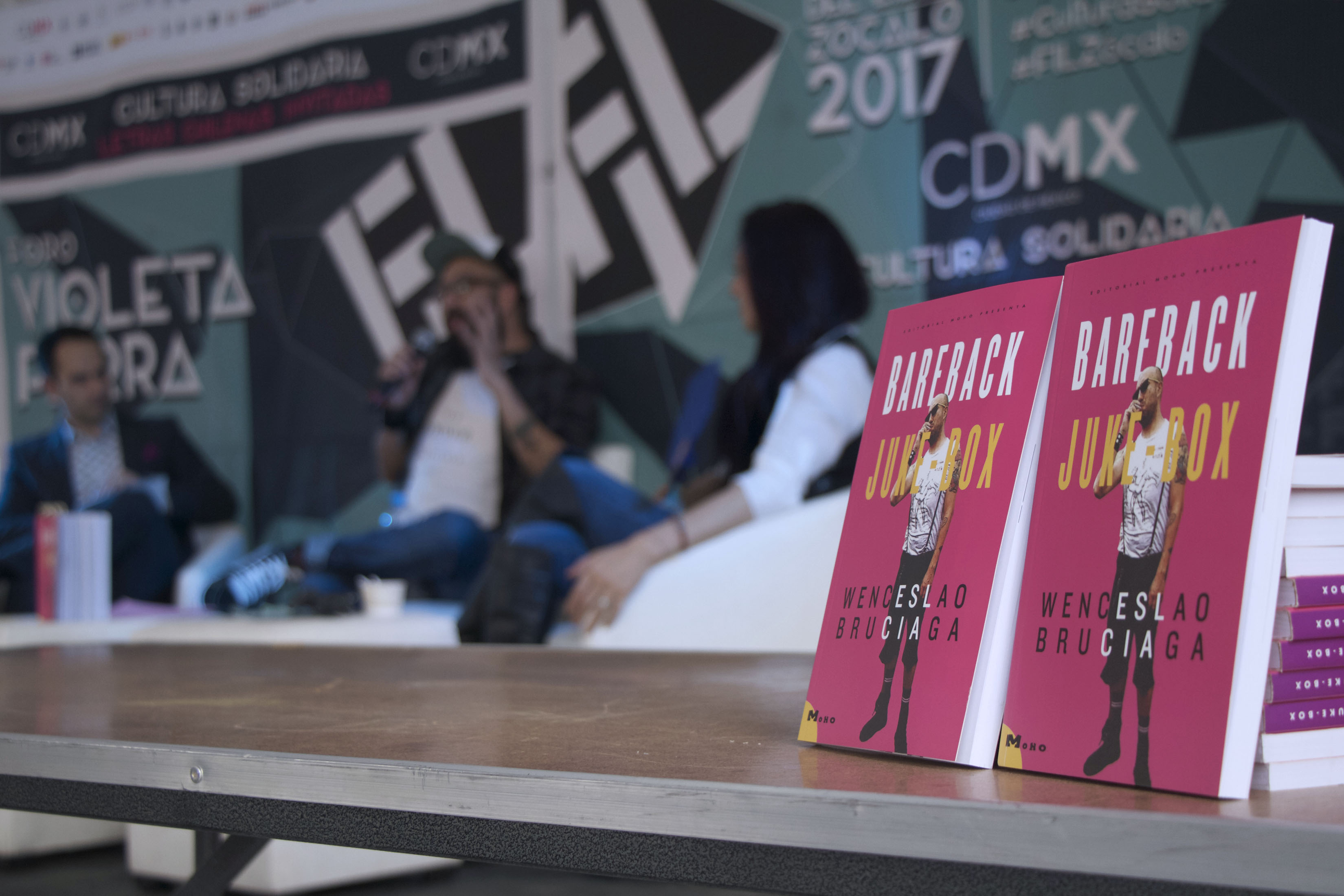
Wenceslao Bruciaga in 2017 during an event for his novel Bareback Jukebox

His next work was Bareback Jukebox (2017), which follows a promiscuous, young gay man known as Hip through his sexual encounters and efforts to contract HIV.

In 2022, he published the novel Pornografía para piromaníacos (Pornography for Pyromaniacs) through the publishing house Sexto Piso. It tells the story of three gay porn actors in San Francisco whose lives are disrupted by an epidemic of suicides among the industry's actors.

== Personal life ==
Bruciaga is openly homosexual. Since 2006, he has written a column in the newspaper Milenio in which he explores the Mexican gay community, his experiences as a person living with HIV, and his musical tastes. His partner is originally from San Francisco.

== Works ==
- Tu lagunero no vuelve más (2000), stories
- Funerales de hombres raros (2012), novel
- Un amigo para la orgía del fin del mundo (2016), non-fiction
- Bareback Jukebox (2017), novel
- Pornografía para piromaniácos (2022), novel
