= Ana Francis Mor =

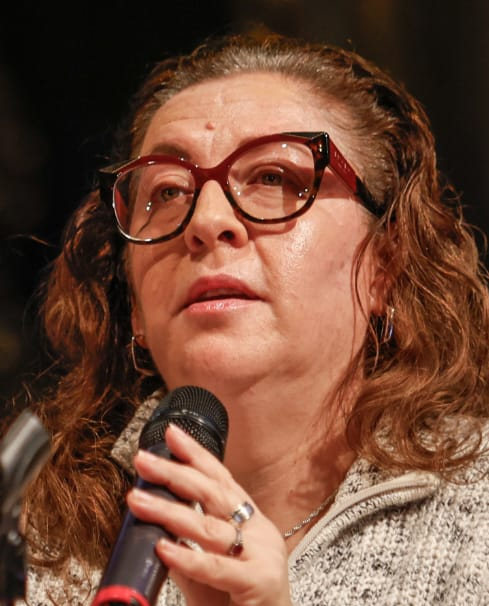
Mor in 2023.

Ana Francis Mor is a Mexican actress, cabaret performer, writer, director and activist. She studied theater at Foro De Teatro Contemporáneo with Ludwik Margules, later taking acting classes with Raul Quintanilla, German cabaret training with Kerny Leopold and Wolfgang Herbert, improvisation with Omar Argentino, stand up comedy and cabaret with Tito Vasconcelos, as well as studying cante jondo with Mogaburo Alfonso Cid and opera with Isaac Bañuelos.

== Theater ==
She began her career as a theater director directing works such La noche en que raptaron a Epifania o Shakespeare lo siento mucho with Gerardo Mancebo del Castillo and Alfonso Carcamo, and Twelfth Night by William Shakespeare, performed only by women, which premiered at Festival del Centro Histórico. She also presented Bellas Atroces by Elena Guiochins, with a season that featured performances of Maria Renee Prudencio, Vanessa Ciangherotti, Cecilia Sotres, and Marisa Rubio.

Continuing with Shakespeare, she mounted Titus Andronicus, adapted by Alfonso Carcamo, and performed only by men, which premiered at the Festival Internacional Cervantino. This adaptation, a musical version, featured performances by Tito Vasconcelos, Juan Manuel Bernal, Julio Bracho, Miguel Rodarte, and others.

== Activism ==
In December 2016, Mor was elected to the board of the International Lesbian, Gay, Bisexual, Trans and Intersex Association, representing Teatro Cabaret Reinas Chulas as Alternate Women's Secretariat.
