= Mexico City Pride =

Annual LGBT event in Mexico City

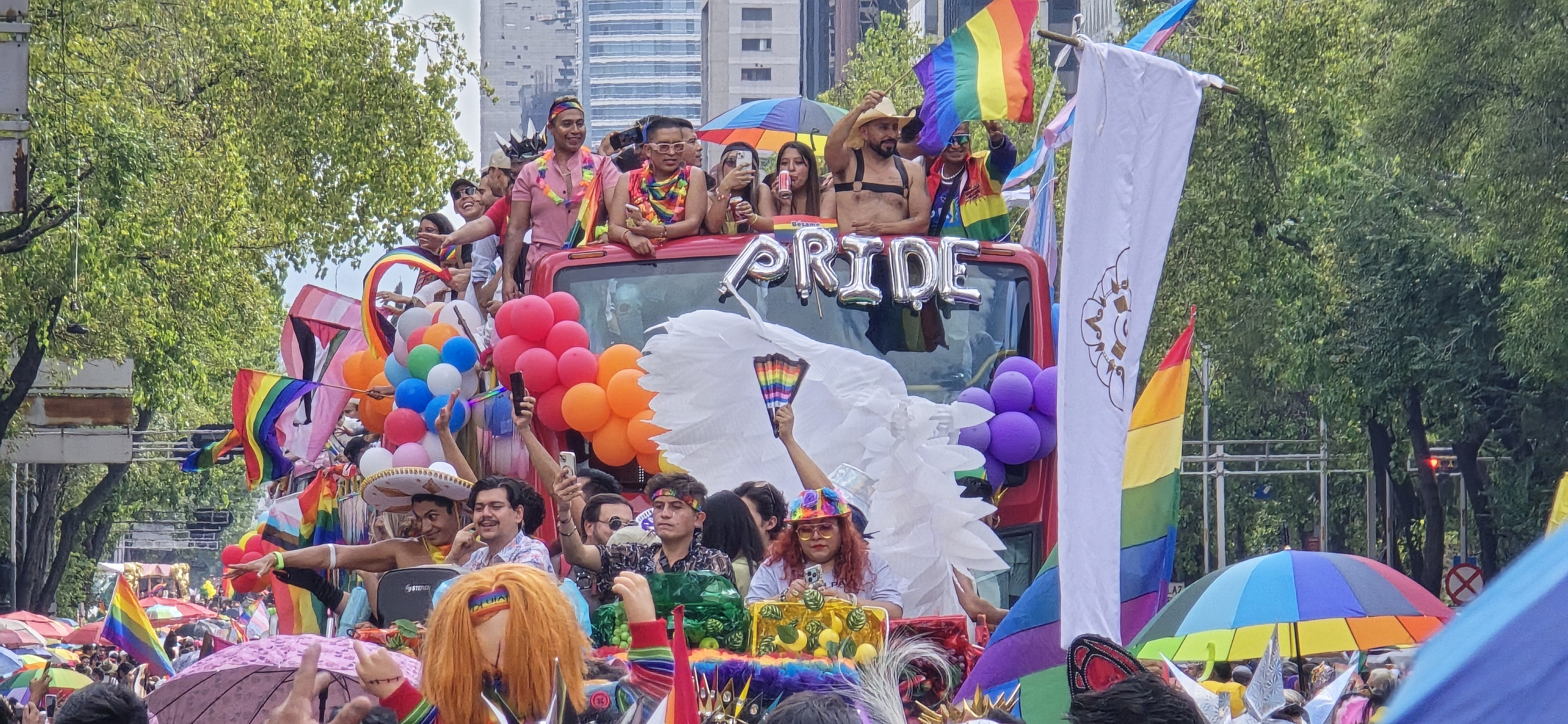
- A float in the 2025 Mexico City Pride Parade
- Frequency: Annual
- Locations: Mexico City, Mexico
- Years active: 1979–present
- Major events: Pride parade
- Organiser: Comité IncluyeT

Mexico City Pride (Spanish: Marcha del Orgullo CDMX) is an annual LGBT pride event held in Mexico City, Mexico. The event, which is the largest Pride event in the country, has been held annually since 1979.

Since Mexico City's legalization of same-sex marriage in 2010, a mass wedding ceremony has been held for same-sex couples prior to the start of the event's pride parade.

== Background ==
Prior to the 1970s, homosexuality was not officially criminalized in Mexico, but was heavily stigmatized, with homosexuals and people perceived as such being subjected to discrimination in public, including repression and violence committed by law enforcement and paramilitary groups. In the early 1970s, multiple clandestine groups were formed with the primary objective of providing support for members and developing an understanding of homosexuality which opposed the common perceptions of it as a psychiatric and/or moral illness. Of these groups, one of the more prominent was the FLH (Frente de Liberación Homosexual), which was founded by activist and filmmaker Nancy Cárdenas and her inner circle and met at her home; however, even this group's history is poorly documented, as secrecy was paramount to each of these clandestine groups. Because of their desire to avoid detection and subsequent repression, the reach of many of these early groups was limited, and they maintained little to no public presence until the latter half of the decade.

Initially founded in response to the 1971 dismissal of two Sears department store employees for being homosexual and disbanded only a few years later, the FLH as a group did little to increase the public presence of queer Mexicans; however, individual members, including Cárdenas herself, began to act more boldly and openly as part of the budding movement. During the middle part of the 1970s, numerous homosexual activist groups. Some, such as the Frente Homosexual de Acción Revolucionaria (FHAR), aimed to represent the Homosexual Liberation Movement as a whole, while others, such as Lesbos and Oikabeth, took on a more specifically lesbian feminist identity. Alongside the FLH before its disbanding, these groups took part in small-scale advocacy against the mistreatment of queer people in Mexico city. Despite the fact that there was no law in Mexico prohibiting homosexuality, police would frequently raid parties and abduct people they saw as being part of the "scene" (el ambiente). In summer of 1975, 3 years before FHAR joined a group of leftist movements and led the first public demonstration for homosexual liberation, members of many of these groups collaborated to draft and sign a statement defining and condemning homophobia among the police.

== History ==
On July 26th, 1978, approximately 30 members of the FHAR joined the Mexican Communist Party (PCM), the Revolutionary Worker's Party (PRT), and other leftist groups in a demonstration commemorating the anniversaries of the start of the student movements of 1968 and the Cuban Revolution. The inclusion of a homosexual contingent in the march was controversial even within Mexico's leftist movements; some considered homosexuality to be a "bourgeoise act", others found it absurd to label what they considered a pathological condition as revolutionary, and some thought that that grievances of homosexuals were so specific that their inclusion as a separate contingent in leftist movements would dilute their message and lead to factionalism. For their part, members of the FHAR defended their revolutionary character by arguing that simply existing publicly as a homosexual was revolutionary due to the fundamentally transgressive nature of such an identity within Mexican culture, and their members and supporters added on that to promote homosexuality was to attack the nuclear family, a fundamental element of the capitalist system. Despite the tenuousness of its connection to the other Mexican leftist groups, the FHAR received enough support from them, especially through Trotskyists and prominent intellectuals, that they were able to make up a substantial contingent of the 1978 demonstration and deliver an address at its conclusion. This union of revolutionary political action and sexual resistance gave rise to the slogan "No political freedom without sexual freedom", which, after being coined at the 1978 march, would become a rallying cry of the broader homosexual liberation movement.

The first pride event in Mexico City was held in June 1979. The 1980 march was scheduled for 28 June 1980, to coincide with the anniversary of the Stonewall riots.

In 1983, two separate Pride marches were held on 25 June. One was a serious "traditional" leftist march, while the other included sex workers and musicians. The second march also included a brief protest at the U.S. embassy, in response to U.S. interventions in Central America.

The following year, two separate marches were again held, with participants verbally and physically confronting individuals in the other march.

In 2000, activists from the Party of the Democratic Revolution and the Social Democratic Party joined the march, handing out condoms with packaging that read "Do it differently, vote differently: for Social Democracy" to bystanders.

In 2018, football fans, despite prior instances of homophobia, peacefully joined the pride parade while celebrating Mexico's progress in the World Cup. The following year's march marked the 50th anniversary of the Stonewall riots, and was attended by roughly 65,000 people.

In 2020 and 2021, the event was not held due to the COVID-19 pandemic. A digital event was held in its stead.

In the 2020s, some Pride participants have called for the exclusion of businesses and corporations from the event.

Mexico City Gay Pride was held 26 June 26 2024 to 1 July 2024, and the parade was on 29 June. The parade, known as la Marcha del Orgullo, began at Ángel de la Independencia and continued through Paseo de la Reforma, Avenida Juárez, Eje Central Lázaro Cárdenas, 5 de Mayo, and the Plaza de la Constitución.
