= Enoé Uranga =

Mexican politician

Member of the Congress of the Union

Personal details
- Born: 1 May 1963
- Political party: Party of the Democratic Revolution

Enoé Margarita Uranga Muñoz (born May 1, 1963) is a Mexican politician. She was elected to the 111th Congress from Federal District on the Party of the Democratic Revolution ticket. In Congress, Uranga is the Secretary of the Commission on Human Rights.

Uranga was the first female openly homosexual member of a state legislature in the country's history. She has also participated in the Mexican LGBT rights movement since the 1980s.

== Career ==
Uranga is a graduate of the Free University of Berlin and the Universidad Autónoma Metropolitana.

From 2000 to 2003, she served as president of the Human Rights Commission of the Federal District Legislative Assembly.
