= Congress of Mexico City =

Legislative body of Mexican Federal District

Coordinates: 19.4366°N 99.1377°W

Type
- Term limits: 1 con llave terms

History
- Founded: 17 September 2018

Structure
- Political groups: Morena (24); National Action Party (15); Ecologist Green Party of Mexico (10); Parliamentary Associations (6); Labor Party (4); Citizens' Movement (3); Institutional Revolutionary Party (2); Party of the Democratic Revolution (2)
- Authority: Political Constitution of Mexico City
- Salary: MX$72,612.30 per month

Elections
- Voting system: 34 with first-past-the-post and 32 with proportional representation

Website
- congresocdmx.gob.mx

The Congress of Mexico City (Spanish: Congreso de la Ciudad de México) is the legislative branch of the government of Mexico City. Between 1988 and 1997, it was known as the Assembly of Representatives of the Federal District (Spanish: Asamblea de Representantes del Distrito Federal). Between 1997 and 2018, it was styled the Legislative Assembly of the Federal District (Spanish: Asamblea Legislativa del Distrito Federal. During those earlier periods, it had reduced powers compared to the current body.

== Composition ==
The Congress consists of 66 deputies, of which 33 are elected by first-past-the-post voting and 33 by proportional representation.

=== III Legislative Assembly ===
From 2003 to 2006.

Party	FPTP	PR	Total by party
Party of the Democratic Revolution	37	0	37
National Action Party	3	13	16
Institutional Revolutionary Party	0	7	7
Ecologist Green Party of Mexico	0	5	5
Independent	0	1	1

=== IV Legislative Assembly ===
From 2006 to 2009.

Party	FPTP	PR	Total by party
Party of the Democratic Revolution	34	0	34
National Action Party	4	13	17
Institutional Revolutionary Party	0	4	4
New Alliance Party	0	4	4
Ecologist Green Party of Mexico	0	3	3
Social Democratic and Peasant Alternative Party	0	2	2
Labor Party	0	1	1
Convergence	0	1	1

=== VI Legislative Assembly ===
From 2012 to 2015.

Political party	FPTP	PR	Total
Party of the Democratic Revolution	31	3	34
National Action Party	9	6	15
Institutional Revolutionary Party		8	8
Labor Party		5	5
Ecologist Green Party of Mexico		3	3
New Alliance Party		1	1
Total	40	26	66

=== VII Legislative Assembly ===
From 2015 to 2018.

Political party	FPTP	PR	Total
Morena	18	4	22
Party of the Democratic Revolution	12	7	19
National Action Party	5	5	10
Institutional Revolutionary Party	3	4	7
Labor Party	1		1
New Alliance Party	1		1
Social Encounter Party		2	2
Ecologist Green Party of Mexico		2	2
Citizens' Movement		1	1
Humanist Party		1	1
Total	40	26	66

== History ==
In 1987, the federal government decided the creation of an Assembly of Representatives (Spanish: Asamblea de Representantes) of the Federal District. This assembly, elected by the inhabitants of the Federal District, had limited legislative powers. Nonetheless, it was the first time since 1928 that the inhabitants of the Federal District recovered some oversight over their local affairs. Eventually, in 1993, full home rule was granted to the Federal District by the federal government, with the creation of an elected Head of Government of the Federal District and a great expansion of the legislative powers of the Assembly of Representatives of the Federal District, which was also renamed the Legislative Assembly.

The first session of the Legislative Assembly of the Federal District ran from 1997 to 2000. Since its installation and until 2018, the Legislative Assembly was renewed for three-year terms a total of six times, when it was replaced by the Congress of Mexico City.
