= Same-sex marriage in Tamaulipas =

Same-sex marriage has been legal in Tamaulipas since 19 November 2022. On 26 October 2022, the Congress of Tamaulipas passed a bill to legalize same-sex marriage in a 23–12 vote. It was published in the official state journal on 18 November, following Governor Américo Villarreal Anaya's signature, and took effect the following day. Tamaulipas was the second-to-last Mexican state to legalize same-sex marriage.

== Legal history ==
=== Background ===
The Supreme Court of Justice of the Nation ruled on 12 June 2015 that state bans on same-sex marriage are unconstitutional nationwide. The court's ruling is considered a "jurisprudential thesis" and did not invalidate state laws, meaning that same-sex couples denied the right to marry would still have to seek individual amparos in court. The ruling standardized the procedures for judges and courts throughout Mexico to approve all applications for same-sex marriages and made the approval mandatory. Specifically, the court ruled that bans on same-sex marriage violate Articles 1 and 4 of the Constitution of Mexico. Article 1 of the Constitution states:

Any form of discrimination, based on ethnic or national origin, gender, age, disabilities, social status, medical conditions, religion, opinions, sexual orientation, marital status, or any other form, which violates the human dignity or seeks to annul or diminish the rights and freedoms of the people, is prohibited. (Note: Spanish: Queda prohibida toda discriminación motivada por origen étnico o nacional, el género, la edad, las discapacidades, la condición social, las condiciones de salud, la religión, las opiniones, las preferencias sexuales, el estado civil o cualquier otra que atente contra la dignidad humana y tenga por objeto anular o menoscabar los derechos y libertades de las personas.)

On 26 June 2014, 57 people filed an amparo challenging the constitutionality of the same-sex marriage ban. They were granted the right to marry on 1 October 2014 by federal judges in both the Third District Court based in Nuevo Laredo and the Ninth District Court based in Tampico. The state appealed the decision to the Supreme Court, which ruled on 22 February 2017 that the definition of marriage in the Civil Code of Tamaulipas was unconstitutional. The court granted the plaintiffs the right to marry their partners. A further 68 people later requested a collective amparo in Tampico, and received approval on 26 March 2015. On 23 May 2016, an amparo was granted to two women seeking the right to marry. In November 2016, a federal judge granted another amparo to a same-sex couple, declaring article 124 of the Civil Code, which referred to married parties as "a man and a woman", unconstitutional and ordering that it be modified to permit same-sex marriages. In January 2017, a federal judge warned deputies of the Congress of Tamaulipas that they would be fined for 100 days if they continued to refuse to legalize same-sex marriage. By November 2018, nineteen same-sex couples had married in Tamaulipas through the recurso de amparo remedy.

Under Mexican law, jurisprudential precedent is established when five rulings in a state reach the same conclusion on the same legal issue. Once this threshold is met, the precedent overrides conflicting provisions in state legislation. In the case of Tamaulipas, three collective amparos and seventeen individual amparos had been approved by September 2018. That same month, LGBT advocates filed proceedings with the Supreme Court seeking to have the ban declared void and unenforceable. On 16 November 2018, the court declared the ban unconstitutional and ordered Congress to modify the Civil Code within 180 business days. However, legislators refused to modify the law. In 2022, a deputy announced she was planning on filing a lawsuit with the Supreme Court in hopes of forcing the state to comply with the earlier ruling. By October 2022, 140 amparos had been granted in Tamaulipas, the largest number of any state.

=== Legislative action ===
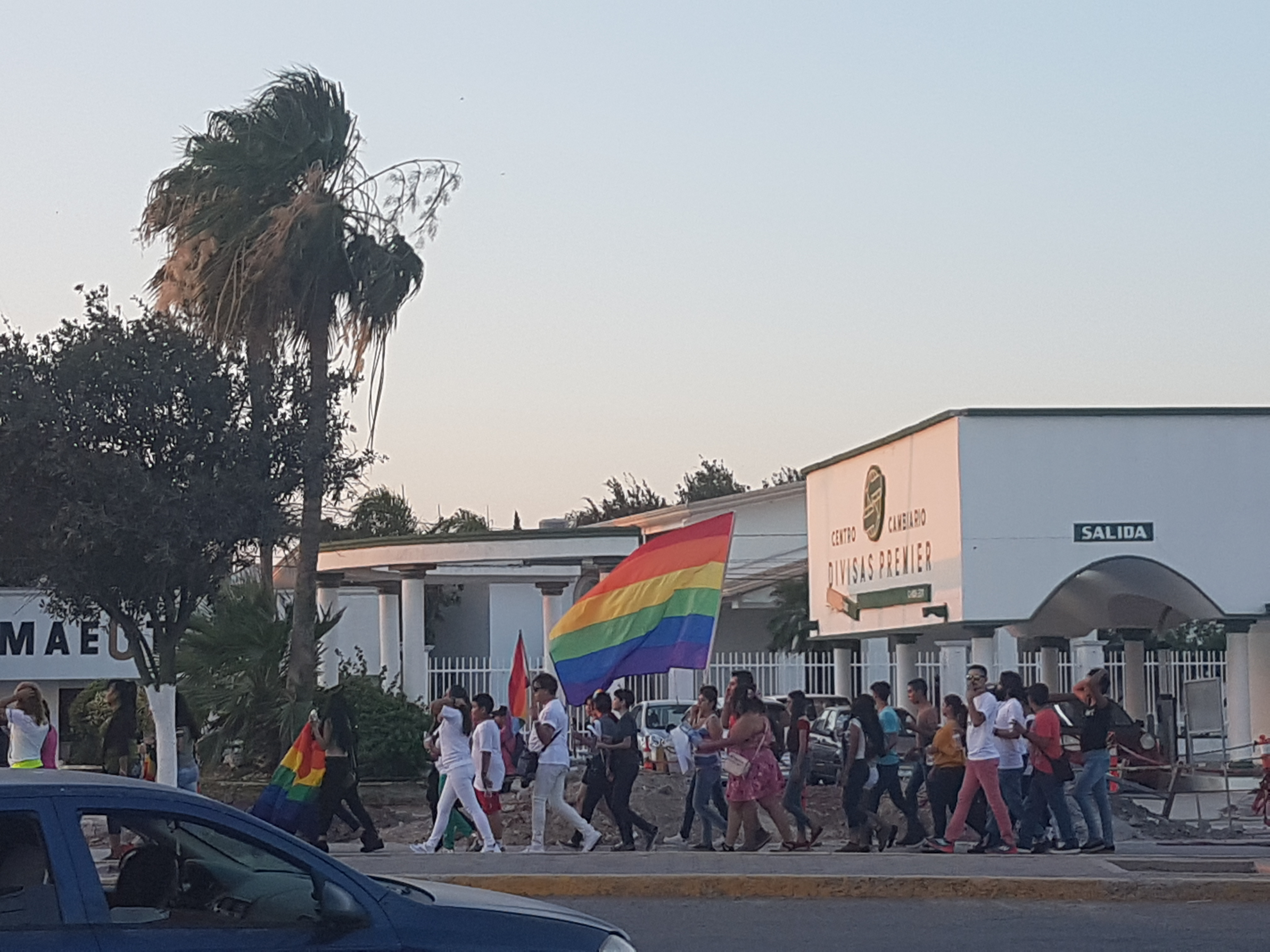
Protest in Río Bravo calling for the legalization of same-sex marriage, June 2019

In 2011, LGBT activists began a campaign urging the Congress of Tamaulipas to pass a bill legalizing same-sex civil unions. In 2012, activists presented legislators with 25,000 signatures in favor of same-sex marriage. In 2013, the Party of the Democratic Revolution (PRD) agreed to support the proposal and bring the issue to a vote in Congress. However, no vote took place over the following years, and the proposal was placed in the "legislative freezer" (congelador legislativo). In June 2015, Deputy Olga Patricia Sosa Ruiz confirmed that Congress was working on a bill to legalize same-sex marriage. She stated that the reform was "complex" and estimated that the law would be passed within the next legislative session, though no bill passed for the following seven years.

A bill to legalize same-sex marriage was introduced to Congress by Deputy Nancy Ruíz Martínez from the conservative National Action Party (PAN) in early October 2022. The law would ensure that married same-sex couples enjoy the same rights, benefits and responsibilities as married opposite-sex couples, including tax benefits, immigration rights, property rights and inheritance, among others. Adoption by same-sex couples had already been legal prior to 2022, and so the legislation would not address this issue further. It was passed by a Congress committee on 19 October in a 14–1 vote. A final vote was scheduled for the following week. The bill was approved by Congress by 23 votes to 12 with 1 abstention on 26 October. The vote was carried out anonymously. Religious groups opposed to same-sex marriage disrupted the session, causing legislators to move to another venue to vote on the legislation. It was published in the official state journal on 18 November, following Governor Américo Villarreal Anaya's signature, and took effect the following day. Article 132 of the Civil Code was amended to read: Those who marry must be of legal age. (Note: Spanish: Quienes contraigan matrimonio deben ser mayores de edad.) The first same-sex marriage performed under the legislation took place in Tampico on 22 November between Carlos Rojas Hernández and Alejandro Tenorio del Angel. Tamaulipas was the second-to-last state to legalize same-sex marriage, before Guerrero the following month.

== Marriage statistics ==
The first same-sex marriage in Altamira was performed in December 2017, and the first in Ciudad Madero took place in February 2018; both carried out through the recurso de amparo remedy. The following table shows the number of same-sex marriages performed in Tamaulipas since legalization in 2022 as reported by the National Institute of Statistics and Geography.

Number of marriages performed in Tamaulipas
| Year | Same-sex | | | Opposite-sex | Total | % same-sex |
| Year | Female | Male | Total | Opposite-sex | Total | % same-sex |
|---|---|---|---|---|---|---|
| 2022 | 20 | 7 | 27 | 13,345 | 13,372 | 0.20% |
| 2023 | 109 | 44 | 151 | 12,859 | 13,012 | 1.16% |
| 2024 | 73 | 45 | 118 | 12,431 | 12,549 | 0.94% |

== Public opinion ==
According to a 2018 survey by the National Institute of Statistics and Geography, 44% of the Tamaulipas public opposed same-sex marriage.

== See also ==
- Same-sex marriage in Mexico
- LGBT rights in Mexico
