= Ociel Baena =

Mexican magistrate and LGBT+ activist (1984–2023)

- Born: 9 December 1984; Saltillo, Coahuila, Mexico
- Died: 13 November 2023 (aged 38); Aguascalientes, Mexico
- Other name: Le Magistrade
- Education: Autonomous University of Coahuila
- Occupations: Electoral magistrate; LGBT+ rights activist
- Known for: First non-binary magistrate in Latin America

Jesús Ociel Baena Saucedo (9 December 1984 – 13 November 2023) was a Mexican activist for non-binary and LGBT+ rights and electoral magistrate at the State Electoral Court of Aguascalientes. On 1 October 2022, they became the first non-binary magistrate in Latin American history.

== Early years ==
Baena was born in Saltillo, Coahuila, where they earned a bachelor's and master's degree in law from the Autonomous University of Coahuila and worked as lecturer of electoral law, legislative process and public management at the University for Professional Development (Unidep, 2010–2011).

In 2012, they moved to Aguascalientes, where they completed a doctoral degree in electoral law at the Autonomous University of Durango and worked as an electoral secretary at the National Electoral Institute (INE) and as a professor of electoral law at both the Autonomous University of Aguascalientes (UAA, 2015–2017) and Cuauhtémoc University (2012–2015).

== Non-binary and LGBT+ activism ==
Baena was a prominent activist of non-binary and LGBT+ rights. As an electoral law specialist, they advocated the inclusion of LGBT+ candidates and issues within political parties, promoted gender-inclusive language, and urged Mexican authorities to issue voting and identity documents that accurately reflect the gender identity of every holder. On 17 May 2023, Baena made history by becoming the first Mexican citizen to receive a gender-neutral passport (which at the time only 16 countries were offering) and was sworn in as a magistrate next to a rainbow flag.

Their accomplishments were covered by CNN en Español in 2022 and the segment was nominated for the 34th GLAAD Media Awards.

== Death ==
Baena and their partner, Dorian Daniel Nieves Herrera, were found dead in their home by Baena's housekeeper on 13 November 2023. According to the Aguascalientes state prosecutor, both had razor-blade wounds, and the security cameras showed no third party entering their home after they arrived in the early hours from a trip to Oaxaca; in addition, toxicology analyses had revealed the presence of methamphetamines in Nieves Herrera's system. The state prosecution service said it suspected Herrera killed Baena before taking his own life; their families, however, rejected that hypothesis. Federal authorities said they would coordinate with state authorities to investigate the deaths, with an interior ministry official saying "it's important to not throw out any line of investigation".

LGBT+ organizations organized silent vigils attended by thousands in 13 cities across Mexico, including the capital. They pointed out that Baena had denounced death threats a few months earlier, when their friend and LGBT+ activist Ulises Salvador Nava was also murdered in the same city, and historically Mexican police had tended to haphazardly dismiss homophobic crimes as "crimes of passion".
