= Same-sex marriage in Baja California Sur =

Same-sex marriage has been legal in Baja California Sur since 29 June 2019. On 27 June, the state Congress passed a bill opening marriage to same-sex couples. It was published in the official state gazette on 28 June and took effect the following day, legalizing same-sex marriage in Baja California Sur.

== Legal history ==
=== Background ===
The Mexican Supreme Court ruled on 12 June 2015 that state bans on same-sex marriage are unconstitutional nationwide. The court's ruling is considered a "jurisprudential thesis" and did not invalidate state laws, meaning that same-sex couples denied the right to marry would still have to seek individual amparos in court. The ruling standardized the procedures for judges and courts throughout Mexico to approve all applications for same-sex marriages and made the approval mandatory.

The first amparo in favor of same-sex marriage in Baja California Sur was granted on 21 October 2014. The case involved 9 same-sex couples, 14 women and 4 men, who had filed an amparo in August 2014 contesting the constitutionality of articles 150 and 330 of the state Civil Code. Article 150 defined marriage as the "legitimate union of a man and a woman" and whose goal was "perpetuating the species", and article 330 similarly defined concubinage as between "a man and a woman". On 21 October, a district court judge declared the two articles unconstitutional and gave the 9 couples in question the right to marry. The Supreme Court ruled in favor of the couples on appeal in March 2016. This court decision only allowed the 9 couples involved in the case to marry. The couples were represented by LGBT activist and lawyer Nolzuly Almodóvar García.

In February 2015, 18 same-sex couples, 32 women and 4 men, filed an amparo in court seeking the right to marry their partner. It was granted by the First District Court in April 2015. Lawyer Almodóvar García has represented several same-sex couples in these amparos. In November 2014, he helped 10 couples from La Paz file an amparo for the right to marry, and did so again in April 2015 for 6 more couples. By 20 August 2016, 180 people had been granted the right to marry by the courts.

=== Legislative action ===
On 9 April 2010, the LGBT organization La Comunidad Sudcaliforniana en Diversidad Sexual proposed amendments to the Civil Code of Baja California Sur to legalize same-sex marriage and adoption by same-sex couples. No action was taken by the state Congress over the following years, as local politicians deflected the issue arguing that "the public must be consulted". Even after several court decisions in favor of same-sex couples, members of the local Congress said that the issue was not on the legislative agenda. On 25 March 2015, the Chief Justice of the Baja California Sur Supreme Court, Daniel Gallo Rodríguez, introduced a same-sex marriage bill to Congress. On 15 April, a member of Congress told the media that analysis of the proposal would begin in May 2015. On 17 May 2016, the International Day Against Homophobia, a congresswoman from the conservative National Action Party (PAN) announced that the bill would be voted on before 30 June. No vote took place however, and the proposal was put in the "legislative freezer" (congelador legislativo).

In the July 2018 elections, the National Regeneration Movement (MORENA) and other parties supporting same-sex marriage won a majority of legislative seats in Congress. In September 2018, several deputies promised to push for the legalization of same-sex marriage. In May 2019, Deputy Rosalba Rodríguez López introduced a same-sex marriage bill to Congress. On 27 June 2019, the state Congress approved the legislation in a 14–5 vote with one abstention. It was signed by Governor Carlos Mendoza Davis the same day and published in the official state gazette on 28 June. The law took effect the following day.

Article 150 of the Civil Code of Baja California Sur now reads as follows:

- in Spanish: El matrimonio es la unión libre de dos personas para realizar la comunidad de vida, en donde ambos se procuran respeto, igualdad y ayuda mutua, mediante la cohabitación doméstica y sexual.
- (Marriage is the free union of two people with the purpose of building a community of life, where both partners seek respect, equality and mutual aid, by means of domestic and sexual cohabitation.)

Political party	Members	Yes	No	Abstain	Absent
National Regeneration Movement	8	8			
Independents	7	3	3		1
Institutional Revolutionary Party	1	1			
National Action Party	1		1		
Labor Party	1	1			
Party of the Democratic Revolution	1		1		
Humanist Party	1	1			
Partido de Renovación Sudcaliforniana	1			1	
Total	21	14	5	1	1

The law granted married same-sex couples the same rights, benefits and responsibilities as married opposite-sex couples, including property rights, inheritance rights, hospital visitation rights, the right to make emergency medical decisions for a partner, protection from domestic violence, etc., but with the exception of adoption rights.

In June 2022, Deputy María Guadalupe Moreno Higuera introduced legislation to Congress to permit married same-sex couples to petition to adopt. The bill was passed by the state congress in November 2022, but was vetoed by the governor in March 2024.

In May 2023, the Baja California Sur Congress approved a citizen-initiated bill expanding the recognition of concubinage to same-sex couples.

== Marriage statistics ==
The following table shows the number of same-sex marriages performed in Baja California Sur since 2019 as reported by the National Institute of Statistics and Geography.

Number of marriages performed in Baja California Sur
Year	Same-sex			Opposite-sex	Total	% same-sex
Year	Female	Male	Total	Opposite-sex	Total	% same-sex
2019	15	12	27	2,391	2,418	1.12%
2020	24	9	33	1,581	1,614	2.04%
2021	34	23	57	2,254	2,311	2.47%

== Public opinion ==
A 2017 opinion poll conducted by Gabinete de Comunicación Estratégica found that 59% of Baja California Sur residents supported same-sex marriage, while 36% were opposed.

According to a 2018 survey by the National Institute of Statistics and Geography, 42% of the Baja California Sur public opposed same-sex marriage.

== See also ==
- Same-sex marriage in Mexico
- LGBT rights in Mexico
