= Same-sex marriage in San Luis Potosí =

Same-sex marriage has been legal in San Luis Potosí since 21 May 2019. The Congress of San Luis Potosí approved a bill to legalize same-sex marriage on 16 May 2019. It was signed into law by Governor Juan Manuel Carreras on 17 May and published in the official state journal on 20 May. The law took effect the following day.

== Legal history ==
=== Background ===
The Supreme Court of Justice of the Nation ruled on 12 June 2015 that state bans on same-sex marriage are unconstitutional nationwide. The court's ruling is considered a "jurisprudential thesis" and did not invalidate state laws, meaning that same-sex couples denied the right to marry would still have to seek individual amparos in court. The ruling standardized the procedures for judges and courts throughout Mexico to approve all applications for same-sex marriages and made the approval mandatory. Specifically, the court ruled that bans on same-sex marriage violate Articles 1 and 4 of the Constitution of Mexico. Article 1 of the Constitution states:

Any form of discrimination, based on ethnic or national origin, gender, age, disabilities, social status, medical conditions, religion, opinions, sexual orientation, marital status, or any other form, which violates the human dignity or seeks to annul or diminish the rights and freedoms of the people, is prohibited. (Note: In some official and indigenous languages of San Luis Potosí: Spanish: Queda prohibida toda discriminación motivada por origen étnico o nacional, el género, la edad, las discapacidades, la condición social, las condiciones de salud, la religión, las opiniones, las preferencias sexuales, el estado civil o cualquier otra que atente contra la dignidad humana y tenga por objeto anular o menoscabar los derechos y libertades de las personas.; Nahuatl: Majmauilo nochi tlaixpinaualistli ika maseualtsitsi katli euani tomexkotlali, siuatl uan tlakatl, ininxiui, uan katli amo ueli motekipanolia, maseualmej, melauatlajkayotl, teotlanejnewili, tlatsintokilistli, kualtiloni pakilistli, sanimanyotl nemili o akinijki kichiuas tlaixpanoli ika maseual tlaixpinauali uan kipia tamantli tlaixkotonali o tlaijtlakoli tlen tlamelaualistli uan tlamakixtiistli ika maseualmej.; Huastec: K’wajat jolbidh an k’e’atnaxtalab abal tam jun pel i ts’ejwantal o tal ti al pil i kwenchaláb, max pel it inik o uxum, k’al I yaulats, k’al i belkaxtaláb, max tomkidh o ibaj ani pilchik i tsalap xi ne’ets kin odhnanchij in walkadhtalabíl patal an atiklabchik.; Pame: Lajañ nip ma’jañp ’mɛ̀jɛ ba’sɨ’ɨyat ke gañ’jiɛ̃̀n’p pur ɛnɛ̀ xi’iùy u nacional, biu’ ke ɛs ru’ ra’kiɨjɨ, ru’ ke nip tju’u ndua’anat, biu’ pɨk la’uĩ̀ kun ru’ màsat ’liɛdat, ra’chjiau’ stakiuãng, ru’ nɛp kjuajay’, ru’ nɛp mjãng, ru’ nɛp ke latsàu ke nda ’lɛ ke pɨk la’uĩ ke la’mẽ nda nɛp ke la’majaun’ u nljung de ru’ derechos y bajañyat de ru’dat ’liɛdat.)

In July 2013, a same-sex couple applied for a marriage license, but their application was rejected. They were granted the right to marry by the First District Court in an amparo on 3 June 2014. On 26 March 2014, Jonathan Llanas Roldan and Gadiel Martínez Saldierna applied for a marriage license at the civil registry office in San Luis Potosí, but were rejected citing the same reasons given to the first couple. They filed an amparo, which was approved on 4 August 2014 by the Sixth District Court. On 7 August, the civil registry filed a counter-injunction to avoid recording the marriage. An appeal was denied by an appellate court in October and the registry was ordered to conduct the marriage. In early September 2014, a lesbian couple applied for a marriage license in Ciudad Valles. The first same-sex marriage in the state occurred in the city of San Luis Potosí in August 2015.

In November 2014, the State Human Rights Commission announced it was reviewing two complaints from parties who had received amparos but were still being denied marriage licenses by the civil registry. By January 2017, 20 amparos had been granted in San Luis Potosí. In May 2019, Paul Ibarra Collazo, president of the Social Diversification Network (Red de Diversificadores Sociales) announced that 150 same-sex couples had married in the state by that time. Ibarra Collazo estimated that an amparo was usually resolved after one or two months, and cost between Mex$4,000 and Mex$15,000.

=== Legislative action ===
A popular initiative to legalize same-sex marriage was proposed in San Luis Potosí in 2014. It was submitted to the Congress on 28 April 2014. On 8 August 2014, the Deputy Chairman of the Commission on Human Rights and Gender Equity, Miguel Maza Hernández, said that an analysis of the proposal would "begin shortly". On 17 June 2015, Maza Hernández announced the state's commitment to extending marriage to same-sex couples and said that deliberations would begin after publication of the June 2015 Supreme Court ruling in the judicial gazette. Maza Hernández added that although no laws prevented same-sex couples from adopting, Congress would prefer to amend the Family Code to codify equal adoption rights along with passing a same-sex marriage law. On 6 June 2016, it was announced that a special committee would study the marriage bill and vote on it within 90 days. In November 2016, the Congress voted against the bill legalizing same-sex marriage. A deputy from the Party of the Democratic Revolution (PRD), who had mistakenly voted against the bill, announced he would introduce a new proposal in 2017.

The new bill was introduced in October 2017. Momentum was gained after the July 2018 elections, in which the PRD, the National Regeneration Movement (MORENA) and the Labor Party (PT), which support the legalization of same-sex marriage, won a plurality of legislative seats in Congress. The bill to legalize same-sex marriage was approved in a vote of 14–12 with 1 abstention on 16 May 2019. It was subsequently signed into law by Governor Juan Manuel Carreras on 17 May and published in the official state journal on 20 May. The law took effect the following day. It ensures that married same-sex couples enjoy the same rights, benefits and responsibilities as married opposite-sex couples, including tax benefits, immigration rights, property rights, inheritance, and adoption rights, among others. Article 15 of the Family Code was amended to read: Marriage is the legal union between two persons, freely entered into, based on respect, with equal rights, duties, and obligations, who live together with the purpose of providing mutual support and forming a family. (Note: Spanish: El matrimonio es la unión legal entre dos personas, libremente contraída, basada en el respeto, con igualdad de derechos, deberes y obligaciones, que hacen vida en común, con la finalidad de proporcionarse ayuda mutua, formando una familia.)

16 May 2019 vote in the Congress
Party	Voted for	Voted against	Abstained	Absent (Did not vote)
National Regeneration Movement	6: María Carmona Salas; Marite Hernández Correa; Angélica Mendoza Camacho; Edson Quintanar Sánchez; Alejandra Valdez Martínez; Rosa Zúñiga Luna	–	–	–
National Action Party	–	6: Rubén Guajardo Barrera; Rolando Hervert Lara; Sonia Mendoza Díaz; Vianey Montes Colunga; Ricardo Villarreal Loo; José Zapata Meraz	–	–
Institutional Revolutionary Party	1: Beatriz Benavente Rodríguez	4: Martín Juárez Córdova; Héctor Ramírez Konishi; María Sánchez Olivares; Laura Silva Celis	–	–
Labor Party	2: Paola Arreola Nieto; Pedro Carrizales Becerra	–	–	–
Ecologist Green Party of Mexico	–	1: Edgardo Hernández Contreras	1: Cándido Ochoa Rojas	–
Citizens' Movement	1: Eugenio Govea Arcos	–	–	–
Concicenia Popular	1: Oscar Vera Fábregat	–	–	–
New Alliance Party	–	1: Martha Barajas García	–	–
Party of the Democratic Revolution	1: María González Tovar	–	–	–
Social Encounter Party	1: Mario Larraga Delgado	–	–	–
Independent	1: Jesús Ramos Hernández	–	–	–
Total	14	12	1	0
Total	51.9%	44.4%	3.7%	0.0%

== Marriage statistics ==
The following table shows the number of same-sex marriages performed in San Luis Potosí since 2020 as reported by the National Institute of Statistics and Geography.

Number of marriages performed in San Luis Potosí
Year	Same-sex			Opposite-sex	Total	% same-sex
Year	Female	Male	Total	Opposite-sex	Total	% same-sex
2020	11	12	23	8,808	8,831	0.26%
2021	18	18	36	11,130	11,166	0.32%
2022	24	33	57	11,836	11,893	0.48%
2023	80	62	142	11,272	11,414	1.24%
2024	93	55	148	10,890	11,038	1.34%

The first same-sex marriage in Ébano occurred in September 2019, whereas the first in Tierra Nueva took place in November 2022. A same-sex marriage was performed in a prison in Rioverde in June 2024, marking the first same-sex wedding between two inmates in the state.

== Public opinion ==
A 2017 opinion poll conducted by the Strategic Communication Office (Gabinete de Comunicación Estratégica) found that 50% of San Luis Potosí residents supported same-sex marriage, while 46% were opposed. According to a 2018 survey by the National Institute of Statistics and Geography, 39% of the San Luis Potosí public opposed same-sex marriage.

== See also ==
- Same-sex marriage in Mexico
- LGBT rights in Mexico
