= Same-sex marriage in Hidalgo =

Same-sex marriage has been legal in Hidalgo since 11 June 2019. A bill for the legalization of same-sex marriages was approved by the Congress of Hidalgo on 14 May 2019. It was signed by Governor Omar Fayad, and published in the official state journal on 10 June. The law took effect the following day, making Hidalgo the sixteenth Mexican state to legalize same-sex marriage.

== Legal history ==
=== Background ===
The Supreme Court of Justice of the Nation ruled on 12 June 2015 that state bans on same-sex marriage are unconstitutional nationwide. The court's ruling is considered a "jurisprudential thesis" and did not invalidate state laws, meaning that same-sex couples denied the right to marry would still have to seek individual amparos in court. The ruling standardized the procedures for judges and courts throughout Mexico to approve all applications for same-sex marriages and made the approval mandatory. Specifically, the court ruled that bans on same-sex marriage violate Articles 1 and 4 of the Constitution of Mexico. Article 1 of the Constitution states:

Any form of discrimination, based on ethnic or national origin, gender, age, disabilities, social status, medical conditions, religion, opinions, sexual orientation, marital status, or any other form, which violates the human dignity or seeks to annul or diminish the rights and freedoms of the people, is prohibited. (Note: In some official and indigenous languages of Hidalgo: Spanish: Queda prohibida toda discriminación motivada por origen étnico o nacional, el género, la edad, las discapacidades, la condición social, las condiciones de salud, la religión, las opiniones, las preferencias sexuales, el estado civil o cualquier otra que atente contra la dignidad humana y tenga por objeto anular o menoscabar los derechos y libertades de las personas.; Otomi: Hingi tsa da t’utsa ya jä’i num’u ngu ra mengu ka ya hnini hñätho, ne ha ra ñ’oho ua ra m’ehñä, ra jeya gä mets’i, ha nxotho ra jä’i, hä ua hin’ä bojä, ha hingi dathi, ne te ma nijä pa, xa nthäti ua hin’ä ne ha ua ma n’a ngu embi t’uni ra m’ui gä mu’i di thegi di mu’i ra n’yo ya jä’i.; Nahuatl: Majmauilo nochi tlaixpinaualistli ika maseualtsitsi katli euani tomexkotlali, siuatl uan tlakatl, ininxiui, uan katli amo ueli motekipanolia, maseualmej, melauatlajkayotl, teotlanejnewili, tlatsintokilistli, kualtiloni pakilistli, sanimanyotl nemili o akinijki kichiuas tlaixpanoli ika maseual tlaixpinauali uan kipia tamantli tlaixkotonali o tlaijtlakoli tlen tlamelaualistli uan tlamakixtiistli ika maseualmej.)

An amparo for six same-sex couples was filed with the Third District Court on 8 August 2014, contesting the constitutionality of articles 8, 11 and 143 of the Family Code. Article 8 described marriage as a "social and permanent institution between a man and a woman", and article 143 similarly defined concubinage as "between a man and a woman". Article 11 characterized marriage as an institution whose goal was "perpetuating the species". In September 2016, the Mexican Supreme Court ruled that the articles violated the Constitution of Mexico, and gave the plaintiff couples the right to marry. Another amparo contesting the constitutionality of the three articles was filed in December 2014. In October 2016, Yolanda Molina Reyes, the state coordinator of Equal Marriage Mexico (Matrimonio Igualitario México), said that within the past two years three separate amparos had been filed in Hidalgo, all of which had been successful in the courts. The first same-sex wedding in the state occurred in Pachuca on 8 October 2016. By August 2017, eight amparos had been granted in Hidalgo.

=== Legislative action ===
As Mexico City and Coahuila had recently legalized civil unions, a similar measure was proposed in Hidalgo in July 2007. However, it stalled in the Congress of Hidalgo as well as in successive legislative sessions. In October 2013, Congress indicated that there was not sufficient "maturity" in society to accept same-sex marriage and that it would instead consider a bill to recognize same-sex cohabitation, but eventually no such partnership bill was approved by Congress.

The July 2018 general elections resulted in the National Regeneration Movement (MORENA), which supports the legalization of same-sex marriage, winning the majority of legislative seats in Congress. In October 2018, a same-sex marriage bill was introduced to Congress by Deputy Areli Miranda Ayala from the Party of the Democratic Revolution (PRD). It was approved on 14 May 2019 in a vote of 18–2 with 8 abstentions. Governor Omar Fayad signed the bill into law on 24 May. It was published in the official state journal on 10 June and took effect the following day. The law ensures that married same-sex couples enjoy the same rights, benefits and responsibilities as married opposite-sex couples, including tax benefits, immigration rights, property rights, inheritance, and adoption rights, among others. The first same-sex couple to marry in Hidalgo under the new law were two women in Tulancingo on 17 June 2019. Article 8 of the Family Code now reads as follows: Marriage is a social and permanent institution through which a legal union is established between two people who, with equal rights and obligations, seek mutual respect, equality, and support. It gives rise to the creation and stability of a family, as well as the fulfillment of a full and responsible shared life. (Note: Spanish: El matrimonio es una institución social y permanente, por la cual se establece la unión jurídica entre dos personas, que, con igualdad de derechos y obligaciones, procuran respeto, igualdad y ayuda mutua, originan el nacimiento y estabilidad de una familia, así como la realización de una comunidad de vida plena y responsable.)

14 May 2019 vote in the Congress
Party	Voted for	Voted against	Abstained	Absent (Did not vote)
National Regeneration Movement	15: Lucero Ambrocio Cruz; Tatiana Ángeles Moreno; Susana Ángeles Quezada; Ricardo Baptista González; Rosalba Calva García; Rafael Garnica Alonso; Víctor Guerrero Trejo; Lisset Marcelino Tovar; Doralicia Martínez Bautista; María Martínez García; Jorge Mayorga Olvera; Roxana Montealegre Salvador; José Muñoz Soto; Armando Quintanar Trejo; Noemí Zitle Rivas	–	1: José Hernández Vera	1: Humberto Veras Godoy
Institutional Revolutionary Party	–	–	5: José Espinosa Silva; Mayka Ortega Eguiluz; Adela Pérez Espinoza; María Pérez Perusquía; Julio Valera Piedras	–
National Action Party	–	2: Asael Hernández Cerón; Areli Maya Monzalvo	–	1: Claudia Luna Islas
Social Encounter Party	2: Viridiana Aceves Calva; Crisóforo Rodríguez Villegas	–	–	–
Labor Party	–	–	1: Miguel Peña Flores	–
Party of the Democratic Revolution	1: Areli Miranda Ayala	–	–	–
New Alliance Party	–	–	1: Marcelino Carbajal Oliver	–
Total	18	2	8	2
Total	60.0%	6.7%	26.7%	6.7%

== Marriage statistics ==
The National Institute of Statistics and Geography reported that 71 same-sex marriages had been performed in Hidalgo in 2019, representing 0.78% of all marriages.

The first same-sex marriage in Tlahuelilpan took place in October 2022. By the end of 2023, fifteen same-sex couples had married in Tulancingo.

== Public opinion ==
A 2017 opinion poll conducted by the Strategic Communication Office (Gabinete de Comunicación Estratégica) found that 51% of Hidalgo residents supported same-sex marriage, while 46% were opposed. According to a 2018 survey by the National Institute of Statistics and Geography, 42% of the Hidalgo public opposed same-sex marriage.

== See also ==
- Same-sex marriage in Mexico
- LGBT rights in Mexico
