= Same-sex marriage in Durango =

2022 legalisation of same-sex marriage in Durango

Same-sex marriage has been legal in Durango since 19 September 2022 in accordance with an executive order issued by Governor Esteban Villegas Villarreal the previous day, addressed to officials of the state civil registry that same-sex couples can marry in the state. The Congress of Durango passed same-sex marriage legislation three days later.

== Legal history ==
=== Background ===
On 12 June 2015, the Supreme Court of Justice of the Nation ruled that state bans on same-sex marriage are unconstitutional nationwide. The court's ruling is considered a "jurisprudential thesis" and did not invalidate state laws, meaning that same-sex couples denied the right to marry would still have to seek individual amparos in court. The ruling standardized the procedures for judges and courts throughout Mexico to approve all applications for same-sex marriages and made the approval mandatory. The court based its decision on Article 4 of the Constitution of Mexico, which respects matrimonial equality, stating that "Man and woman are equal under the law. The law shall protect the organization and development of the family."

The first same-sex marriage in Durango was performed in December 2013 for a same-sex couple, who chose to remain anonymous, in Durango City after obtaining an amparo from the Supreme Court. On 13 November 2014, it was announced that 18 people had filed an amparo for same-sex marriage rights in the state. Oral arguments were scheduled for 27 November 2014. Representatives from the Congress of Durango argued against the amparo in court, stating that challenges to provisions of the Civil Code had to be made within 30 days of enactment, thus the plaintiffs were "66 years too late". In April 2015, the 18 couples hit another setback when the state claimed they could not seek an amparo because they were not residents of the state. The couples reiterated their intention to take their case to the Supreme Court if needed. 51 same-sex couples had married via the recurso de amparo remedy by September 2022.

=== Legislative action ===
In September 2013, Deputy Israel Soto Peña from the Party of the Democratic Revolution introduced a bill to the Congress of Durango to legalize same-sex marriage. On 10 April 2014, the bill was rejected on the basis that it would not sufficiently address the legal changes necessary to amend the Civil Code. In May, Soto Peña announced that he would revamp the measure and resubmit it, which he did on 1 November 2014. On 10 February 2016, the Justice Commission of the Congress of Durango approved the draft bill. However, the bill's plenary discussion was postponed for 6 months to organize discussions on the matter and to inform legislators on the subject before a vote. On 31 January 2017, Congress rejected the bill in a 4–15 vote with 4 abstentions. The four deputies in favor were members of the PRD and the conservative National Action Party (PAN), while those opposed were mostly members of the Institutional Revolutionary Party (PRI). The July 2018 elections resulted in the National Revolutionary Movement (MORENA), PRD and the Labor Party (PT), which expressed support for same-sex marriage in their party platforms, winning the majority of legislative seats in Durango.

In July 2022 a federal judge ordered the Congress of Durango to consider a same-sex-marriage bill in its next legislative session. The ruling did not require a particular vote but required legislators to go on record as to whether they would vote to legalize same-sex marriage in accordance with Supreme Court jurisprudence. The court set its deadline until 1 September 2022. For the following two months, members of Congress delayed discussions on the bill and postponed votes several times. On 21 September 2022, only three days after Governor Villegas Villarreal issued an executive decree legalizing same-sex marriage in Durango, Congress voted 15–9 to pass a bill codifying the right to same-sex marriage in the Civil Code and amending non-discrimination laws to include sexual orientation. The bill was published in the official journal on 9 October 2022, and took effect the following day.

Article 141 of the Civil Code was amended to read:

- in Spanish: Los funcionarios facultados por la Ley para celebrar el matrimonio garantizarán la no discriminación por: origen étnico o nacional, el género, las discapacidades, la condición social, las condiciones de salud, la religión, las opiniones, las preferencias sexuales o cualquier otra que atente contra la dignidad humana y tenga por objeto anular o menoscabar los derechos humanos.
- (Officials empowered by law to celebrate marriages will guarantee non-discrimination based on: ethnic or national origin, gender, disability, social status, health condition, religion, opinion, sexual preference or any other reason that violates human dignity and is intended to nullify or undermine human rights.)

Political party	Members	Yes	No	Abstain
Institutional Revolutionary Party	8	5	2	1
National Regeneration Movement	7	7		
National Action Party	6		6	
Party of the Democratic Revolution	2	2		
Labor Party	1		1	
Ecologist Green Party of Mexico	1	1		
Total	25	15	9	1

=== Executive decree (2022) ===
On 18 September 2022, Governor Esteban Villegas Villarreal, in office for only three days, published an executive order legalizing same-sex marriage in Durango. The decree was signed by the Secretary of General of Government, Héctor Vela Valenzuela, published in the state's official journal, and took effect the following day, 19 September 2022. It instructed officials of the state civil registry to issue marriage licenses to same-sex couples, to perform marriage ceremonies for all couples without discrimination, and removed the requirement of couples to obtain a judicial amparo. Villegas Villarreal cited similar decrees in other states, including in Chihuahua in 2015, Baja California in 2017, and Guanajuato in 2021.

== Public opinion ==
According to a 2018 survey by the National Institute of Statistics and Geography, 39% of the Durango public opposed same-sex marriage.

== See also ==
- Same-sex marriage in Mexico
- LGBT rights in Mexico
