= Same-sex marriage in Aguascalientes =

Same-sex marriage is legal in Aguascalientes, following a ruling from the Supreme Court of Justice of the Nation, issued on 2 April 2019, that the state's ban on same-sex marriage violated the Constitution of Mexico. The ruling came into effect upon publication in the Official Gazette of the Federation on 16 August 2019. Aguascalientes remains one of only two Mexican states, alongside Chihuahua, not to have amended statutory law to codify same-sex marriage.

== Legal history ==
=== Background ===
The Supreme Court of Justice of the Nation ruled on 12 June 2015 that state bans on same-sex marriage are unconstitutional nationwide. The court's ruling is considered a "jurisprudential thesis" and did not invalidate state laws, meaning that same-sex couples denied the right to marry would still have to seek individual amparos in court. The ruling standardized the procedures for judges and courts throughout Mexico to approve all applications for same-sex marriages and made the approval mandatory. Specifically, the court ruled that bans on same-sex marriage violate Articles 1 and 4 of the Constitution of Mexico. Article 1 of the Constitution states:

Any form of discrimination, based on ethnic or national origin, gender, age, disabilities, social status, medical conditions, religion, opinions, sexual orientation, marital status, or any other form, which violates the human dignity or seeks to annul or diminish the rights and freedoms of the people, is prohibited. (Note: Spanish: Queda prohibida toda discriminación motivada por origen étnico o nacional, el género, la edad, las discapacidades, la condición social, las condiciones de salud, la religión, las opiniones, las preferencias sexuales, el estado civil o cualquier otra que atente contra la dignidad humana y tenga por objeto anular o menoscabar los derechos y libertades de las personas.)

In May 2014, Manuel Gutiérrez Flores and Javier Rodrígueza Rivero requested an amparo in Aguascalientes after city officials rejected their request for a marriage license. The couple contested the constitutionality of articles 143, 144 and 313bis of the Civil Code. Article 143 defined marriage as "the union of one man and one woman", and article 313bis similarly defined concubinage as between "one man and one woman". Article 144 characterized marriage as an institution whose purpose was "perpetuating the species". The amparo was approved by a court on 29 August 2014, and the couple married on 3 September, marking the first same-sex marriage in Aguascalientes. A lesbian couple, Susana Ortega Guzmán and Mariana Martín Aguirre, also applied for an amparo in May 2014. They received a favorable verdict on 2 September 2014, and married on 21 August 2015. On 1 September 2014, Julián Elizalde Peña, the coordinator of the SerGay Collective of Aguascalientes (Colectivo SerGay de Aguascalientes), announced that a third amparo had been requested in the state. Elizalde Peña announced that an additional two amparos were pending on 13 October 2014. In December 2016, another same-sex couple was granted the right to marry, followed by another couple on 25 January 2017, and four more couples in late November 2017. By December 2017, fourteen same-sex couples had married in the state via the recurso de amparo remedy. This had increased to twenty-three couples by 2018.

=== Early bills ===
A civil union bill was first proposed in Aguascalientes in 2010 by Deputy Nora Ruvalcaba Gámez. The measure would have established a legal institution with several of the rights, benefits, obligations and responsibilities of marriage. Opposition from the Institutional Revolutionary Party (PRI) and the National Action Party (PAN) crippled its passage in Congress. In September 2014, Deputy Cuauhtemoc Escobedo Tejad from the Party of the Democratic Revolution (PRD) announced that Governor Carlos Lozano de la Torre would introduce a civil union bill, and possibly a same-sex marriage bill, to the Congress of Aguascalientes. Escobeda Tejada further announced that if Lozano de la Torre did not introduce the bill, he would do so himself. On 4 November, Escobedo Tejada presented a civil union proposal to Congress, defining civil partnerships as "living together, forming a heritage, having children if they wish, and dealing with situations that arise for a couple." A citizens' initiative for same-sex marriage had been introduced to Congress a few weeks prior to his bill. Debate on three initiatives with different schemes for marriage and civil unions began on 21 November.

On 15 June 2016, Martha Márquez Alvarado, a congresswoman from the National Action Party, indicated that she was preparing a civil union proposal and would present it to Congress when ready. In April 2017, the State Human Rights Commission announced it would introduce a new same-sex marriage bill, and in October 2017 another bill was introduced to Congress by PRD Deputy Josefina Moreno Pérez. In April 2018, the National Action Party, which held a majority of seats in Congress, announced it would oppose all the proposed same-sex marriage and civil union bills.

=== Action of unconstitutionality ===
In 2018, the National Human Rights Commission filed an action of unconstitutionality (acción de inconstitucionalidad; docketed 40/2018) against articles 143, 144 and 313bis of the Civil Code. The Congress of Aguascalientes had recently amended state family law but while doing so did not repeal the state's ban on same-sex marriage. The Commission took this opportunity to file the action of unconstitutionality. On 2 April 2019, the full bench of the Mexican Supreme Court ruled unanimously that the three articles were void and unconstitutional, determining that banning same-sex couples from marrying violates Articles 1 and 4 of the Constitution of Mexico. The ruling came into effect upon publication in the Official Gazette of the Federation (Diario Oficial de la Federación) on 16 August 2019. However, the civil registry began processing marriage applications from same-sex couples and issuing marriage licenses prior to the publication date. A couple applied to marry the same day as the ruling was handed down, and wed shortly thereafter. On 6 April 2019, a same-sex couple, together for eleven years, wed in a Masonic ceremony in the city of Aguascalientes.

The Congress of Aguascalientes has yet to pass legislation to codify the Supreme Court ruling into statutory law. In 2025, PAN leaders, including Alma Hilda Medina Macías, indicated that the state government could advance a same-sex marriage bill in the new future, but that such a law change was not a "priority". In June 2026, activists organized a protest march in favor of same-sex marriage in front of the Congress building.

== Marriage statistics ==
The following table shows the number of same-sex marriages performed in Aguascalientes since legalization in 2019 as reported by the National Institute of Statistics and Geography.

Number of marriages performed in Aguascalientes
Year	Same-sex			Opposite-sex	Total	% same-sex
Year	Female	Male	Total	Opposite-sex	Total	% same-sex
2019	44	29	73	6,852	6,925	1.05%
2020	37	22	59	4,730	4,789	1.23%
2021	58	30	88	6,705	6,793	1.30%
2022	73	39	112	6,414	6,526	1.72%
2023	76	43	119	6,335	6,454	1.84%
2024	53	28	81	6,152	6,233	1.30%

== Public opinion ==
A 2017 opinion poll conducted by the Strategic Communication Office (Gabinete de Comunicación Estratégica) found that 50% of Aguascalientes residents supported same-sex marriage, while 45% were opposed. According to a 2018 survey by the National Institute of Statistics and Geography, 36% of the Aguascalientes public opposed same-sex marriage.

== See also ==
- Same-sex marriage in Mexico
- LGBT rights in Mexico
