= Patria Jiménez =

Mexican politician

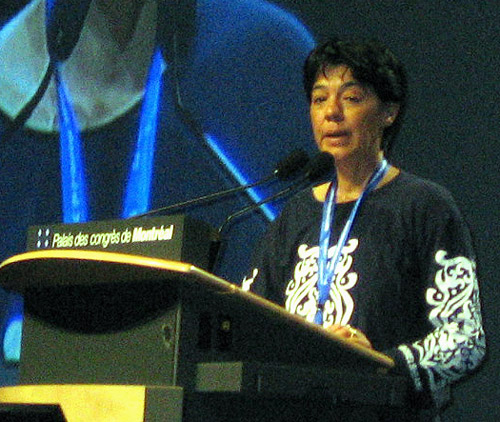
Patria Jiménez at the 2006 International Conference on LGBT Human Rights

Patria Jiménez (born Elsa Patria Jiménez Flores in 1957 in San Luis Potosí, Mexico) is a Mexican politician and head of El Clóset de Sor Juana (Sister Juana's Closet). In 1997, representing the PRD. Openly lesbian, she became the first gay member of Mexico's legislature in the country's history—the first in any legislature in Latin America.

Jiménez is the longtime head of Sister Juana's Closet, a lesbian rights group named after Juana Inés de la Cruz, a Carmelite nun and renowned Mexican poet. It is a United Nations accredited Non-Governmental Organization (NGO).

Both as a civil rights leader and a member of the government, Jimenez is a major Latin American voice for LGBT rights and civil rights in general.

== Political career ==
Jiménez is a member of the Party of the Democratic Revolution (PRD). In 1997 she was elected federal deputy hence she served during the LVII Legislature of the Mexican Congress. In 2000 she was elected substitute Senator but took office in the senate until 2006 when senator Demetrio Sodi left that position therefore she served as senator during the final months of the LIX Legislature.
