= Same-sex marriage in Guerrero =

Same-sex marriage has been legal in Guerrero since 31 December 2022. The Congress of Guerrero passed a same-sex marriage bill on 25 October 2022, which was subsequently signed into law by Governor Evelyn Salgado Pineda. It was published in the state's official gazette on 30 December and took effect the following day, making Guerrero the last Mexican state to legalise same-sex marriage. Previously, the status of same-sex marriage in Guerrero varied between municipalities. Some municipalities had decided to issue marriage licenses to same-sex couples in line with a 2015 gubernatorial directive, and the state civil registry agreed to recognize those marriages in 2016.

Following the Supreme Court of Justice of the Nation's ruling on 12 June 2015 that same-sex marriage bans are unconstitutional nationwide under the Constitution of Mexico, officials in Guerrero began announcing plans for a collective group wedding. Governor Rogelio Ortega Martínez submitted a same-sex marriage bill to Congress on 7 July and instructed civil registrars to issue marriage licenses to same-sex couples. Legislators lamented they would have preferred to have the bill passed before marriages took place, but given the time line presented, this was unlikely. On 10 July, twenty same-sex couples were married by Ortega Martínez in Acapulco. However, not all municipalities agreed to issue marriage licenses.

== Legal history ==
=== Background ===
The Supreme Court of Justice of the Nation ruled on 12 June 2015 that state bans on same-sex marriage are unconstitutional nationwide. The court's ruling is considered a "jurisprudential thesis" and did not invalidate state laws, meaning that same-sex couples denied the right to marry would still have to seek individual amparos in court. The ruling standardized the procedures for judges and courts throughout Mexico to approve all applications for same-sex marriages and made the approval mandatory. Specifically, the court ruled that bans on same-sex marriage violate Articles 1 and 4 of the Constitution of Mexico. Article 1 of the Constitution states:

Any form of discrimination, based on ethnic or national origin, gender, age, disabilities, social status, medical conditions, religion, opinions, sexual orientation, marital status, or any other form, which violates the human dignity or seeks to annul or diminish the rights and freedoms of the people, is prohibited. (Note: In some official and indigenous languages of Puebla: Spanish: Queda prohibida toda discriminación motivada por origen étnico o nacional, el género, la edad, las discapacidades, la condición social, las condiciones de salud, la religión, las opiniones, las preferencias sexuales, el estado civil o cualquier otra que atente contra la dignidad humana y tenga por objeto anular o menoscabar los derechos y libertades de las personas.; Nahuatl: Majmauilo nochi tlaixpinaualistli ika maseualtsitsi katli euani tomexkotlali, siuatl uan tlakatl, ininxiui, uan katli amo ueli motekipanolia, maseualmej, melauatlajkayotl, teotlanejnewili, tlatsintokilistli, kualtiloni pakilistli, sanimanyotl nemili o akinijki kichiuas tlaixpanoli ika maseual tlaixpinauali uan kipia tamantli tlaixkotonali o tlaijtlakoli tlen tlamelaualistli uan tlamakixtiistli ika maseualmej.; Otomi: Hingi tsa da t’utsa ya jä’i num’u ngu ra mengu ka ya hnini hñätho, ne ha ra ñ’oho ua ra m’ehñä, ra jeya gä mets’i, ha nxotho ra jä’i, hä ua hin’ä bojä, ha hingi dathi, ne te ma nijä pa, xa nthäti ua hin’ä ne ha ua ma n’a ngu embi t’uni ra m’ui gä mu’i di thegi di mu’i ra n’yo ya jä’i.; Tlapanec: Xángoo magùmii dí rà’kí xugíín xàbù tsí nu’ta mámbá ajngáa, xú má à’gù xú má xàbíyà, dí tsigúún, jàmí xàbù tsí nanguá gí’do xugíí xuyuu, xàbù ngína, xàbù gí’do nandii, xàbù mbò nutáán aná lú’ mikuíí, dí nután xàbù, xàbù àjmà inii ñajun, xú má rí nindxuù xàbù, xángoo matho’o ìmbá xtángoo di maxgúndíì xú i’tán ìyìì’ rígì’, dí wa’da xàbù.; Amuzgo: Conjotyeⁿ na xonde̱ nnuijna’ñi ts’aⁿ cue’ nge conuiñi tsjaⁿ n’aⁿgue, o cue’ nge tyua na tuiñi, cue’ nge conuiñi is’a o iscu, cue’ nge chu’, cue’ nge tyi’cande̱’ñi, cue’ nge cje m’aⁿ quio nomnde nt’omcheⁿ, cue’ nge tsixuaⁿ cui tcu, cue’ nge na matsiu’co, cue’ nge na conue nt’omcheⁿ, cue’ nge nt’omcheⁿ cabe’tyingiuhe iscu o is’a, cue’ nge jnde̱ toco o tja nngoco, ndo’ minquia cuicheⁿ ’na m’aⁿa’ nacjo’ na cajndañi ts’aⁿ, ndo’ na ndyotyjecoha’ ndo’ na matsityui’a’ nji na matyijndi na nnguiñom’a’ ts’aⁿ ndo’ na manquiaha’ nañja na nng’oⁿ ts’aⁿ cha’na na cui ts’aⁿ na bina’ñi.)

Media outlets reported that the first same-sex marriage in Guerrero would take place on 28 September 2013; however, the wedding did not actually occur until 5 June 2014, in Teloloapan. City officials cited a 2012 Supreme Court ruling concerning Oaxaca, which had ordered the state to recognize three same-sex marriages, to justify issuing a marriage license to the couple. At the time, the Civil Code of Guerrero did not permit same-sex marriage. State lawyers argued that the marriage was "illegal and void" and indicated that the city officials involved could face prosecution. On 20 December 2014, a same-sex marriage ceremony was held in Chilapa de Álvarez, although the marriage was registered in Iztapalapa in Mexico City. The couple stated that it was "important for them to have a celebration complete with rings from their godparents, vows, and a toast with their friends and families in the city where they live and work, to help other same-sex couples gain societal acceptance."

=== Gubernatorial directive and administrative implementation ===
On 25 June 2015, following the Supreme Court's ruling striking down district same-sex marriage bans on a "jurisprudential" basis, the state civil registry announced that it had planned a collective same-sex marriage ceremony for 10 July, and indicated that there would have to be a change to the law to allow same-sex marriage, passed through the Congress of Guerrero before the official commencement. The registry announced more details of their plan, advising that only select registration offices in the state would be able to participate in the collective marriage event. On 7 July, Governor Rogelio Ortega Martínez instructed civil agencies to issue marriage licenses to same-sex couples regardless of the state ban. Three days later, Ortega Martínez officiated at the marriages of twenty same-sex couples in Acapulco, even though Congress had not yet amended state law to permit same-sex marriage. Officials in Tecpan de Galeana announced on 12 July that the municipality would also issue marriage licenses.

On 13 January 2016, the director of the civil registry of Acapulco, Ricardo Martínez Sánchez, argued that the twenty same-sex marriages conducted by Ortega Martínez on 10 July 2015 were "void". On 13 February, a day before mass Valentine's Day weddings were planned statewide, the state civil registry issued a statement that municipalities would be allowed to issue marriage licenses to same-sex couples and affirmed that such marriages would be recognized by the state government. Nevertheless, not all municipalities agreed to issue licenses in line with the directive. As of 2016, Chilpancingo de los Bravo, Taxco de Alarcón, Tecpán de Galeana and Zihuatanejo de Azueta were marrying same-sex couples. An LGBT advocacy group said they were considering filing a lawsuit to have all municipalities perform same-sex marriages.

=== Legislative action ===
A bill to establish civil unions was first debated in the Congress of Guerrero in 2009, but the legislation stalled and was not voted on. In 2014, as Coahuila had recently legalized same-sex marriage, LGBT rights organizations in Guerrero began pressing Congress to approve same-sex marriage and adoption by same-sex couples. On 7 July 2015, Governor Rogelio Ortega Martínez submitted a same-sex marriage bill to Congress. On 20 May 2016, Deputy Héctor Vicario Castrejón from the Institutional Revolutionary Party (PRI) said the bill would be voted on "soon". However, this did not happen, and the bill, as with the previous legislation, was placed in the "legislative freezer" (congelador legislativo).

The July 2018 elections resulted in the National Regeneration Movement (MORENA), which supports the legalization of same-sex marriage, winning the majority of legislative seats in Guerrero. In November 2018, Deputy Moisés Reyes Sandoval introduced legislation to legalize same-sex marriage. However, the bill was rejected by Congress in October 2020 by a 15–23 vote, with several MORENA deputies voting against, despite having been elected on a party platform supporting same-sex marriage. Reyes Sandoval announced his intention to challenge this decision to the Mexican Supreme Court, saying that "whether they [conservatives] like it or not they will be gay marriage [in Guerrero]". In September 2022, Deputy Héctor Agüero García introduced a new same-sex marriage bill to Congress. The bill was passed 38–6 with 2 abstentions on 25 October 2022. Although the vote was carried out anonymously, some deputies publicly expressed their position on the bill. Deputies Yoloczin Domínguez Serna and Jacinto González Varona said that the legislation was meant for "those people who have left their lives on the road, in their struggle to be treated with dignity" and described the bill's passage as a "historical debt". The bill changed all references to married spouses in the Civil Code from "a man and a woman" to "two people". It was signed by Governor Evelyn Salgado Pineda, and published in the state's official gazette on 30 December 2022. The legislation took effect the following day, making Guerrero the last Mexican state to legalise same-sex marriage.

The bill also amended article 494bis of the Civil Code to read: Concubinage is a de facto union between two persons who, being legally capable of marrying each other, have not done so in the manner prescribed by law, and who live together openly and permanently. This situation may only be established if they have conceived and raised children together, or if they have lived publicly as a couple for more than two years. (Note: Spanish: El concubinato es la unión de hecho entre dos personas, que estando en aptitud de contraer matrimonio entre sí, no lo han celebrado en los términos que la ley señala y hacen vida en común de manera notoria y permanente, situación que sólo podrá demostrarse si han procreado, educado juntas hijas e hijos o han vivido públicamente como pareja durante más de dos años.)

== Marriage statistics ==
By September 2015, approximately 60 same-sex marriages had occurred in the state, mostly in the municipalities of Chilpancingo de los Bravo, Acapulco and Zihuatanejo de Azueta.

== Public opinion ==
A 2017 opinion poll conducted by the Strategic Communication Office (Gabinete de Comunicación Estratégica) found that 50% of Guerrero residents supported same-sex marriage, while 46% were opposed. According to a 2018 survey by the National Institute of Statistics and Geography, 54% of the Guerrero public opposed same-sex marriage.

== See also ==
- Same-sex marriage in Mexico
- LGBT rights in Mexico
