= Same-sex union legislation =

Marriage open to same-sex couples Legislation or binding domestic court ruling establishing same-sex marriage, but marriage is not yet provided for Same-sex marriage recognized when performed in certain other jurisdictions, and accorded greater rights than local same-sex unions (if any) Civil unions or domestic partnerships Limited legal recognition Local certification without legal force Limited recognition of marriage performed in certain other jurisdictions (residency rights for spouses) Same-sex unions not legally recognized

Same-sex marriage is legal in the following countries: Andorra, Argentina, Australia, Austria, Belgium, Brazil, Canada, Chile, Colombia, Costa Rica, Cuba, Denmark, Ecuador, Estonia, Finland, France, Germany, Greece, (Note: excluding the Monastic community of Mount Athos.) Iceland, Ireland, Liechtenstein, Luxembourg, Malta, Mexico, the Netherlands, (Note: The Netherlands proper, Aruba, and Curaçao. Same-sex marriages performed there are recognized in Sint Maarten.) New Zealand, (Note: New Zealand proper and the Ross Dependency.) Norway, Portugal, Slovenia, South Africa, Spain, Sweden, Switzerland, Taiwan, Thailand, the United Kingdom, (Note: England, Wales, Scotland and Northern Ireland; the overseas territories of Akrotiri and Dhekelia, the British Antarctic Territory, the British Indian Ocean Territory, the Falkland Islands, Gibraltar, the Pitcairn Islands, Saint Helena, Ascension, and Tristan da Cunha, South Georgia and the South Sandwich Islands; the Crown dependencies of Guernsey, the Isle of Man and Jersey.) the United States, (Note: 50 states, the District of Columbia, Guam, the Northern Mariana Islands, Puerto Rico, the United States Virgin Islands and multiple tribal nations) and Uruguay.

Same-sex marriage is recognized, but not performed, in Israel and the United States territory of American Samoa. Furthermore, same-sex marriages performed elsewhere in the Kingdom of the Netherlands are recognized in Sint Maarten. Whether same-sex couples should be allowed to marry has been and remains the topic of debate worldwide. 32 countries and four jurisdictions worldwide have passed constitutional amendments that explicitly prohibit the legal recognition of same-sex marriage and sometimes other forms of legal unions as well. Sixteen countries and 34 jurisdictions worldwide have authorized civil unions or unregistered cohabitation for same-sex couples as an alternative to marriage. The legal name of those unions as well as the number of rights that they provide can vary greatly.

== Legislative efforts to recognise same-sex unions ==
=== National level ===
The first legislation of unregistered cohabitation was introduced in the Netherlands in June 1979. However, the first substantial recognition of same-sex couples did not occur before the introduction of a new legal form, that of registered partnerships, which was first enacted in Denmark in June 1989. Many countries have followed with similar legislation since then. Legislation of these forms of legal unions still occur with a variety of different names, even after the introduction of same sex marriage, although sometimes they are overwritten by subsequent legislation of same-sex marriage.

As of 18 November 2026, certain alternative form of legal recognition other than marriage has been allowed on a national level in Bolivia, Croatia, Cyprus, Czechia, Hungary, Italy, Latvia, Monaco, Montenegro, and San Marino.

As of 18 November 2026, legislation to allow an alternative form of legal recognition of same-sex couples other than marriage is pending, or has passed at least one legislative house on a national level in Kosovo and Peru.

As of 18 November 2026, same-sex marriage has been legal (nationwide or in some parts) in Andorra, Argentina, Australia, Austria, Belgium, Brazil, Canada, Chile, Colombia, Costa Rica, Cuba, Denmark, Ecuador, Estonia, Finland, France, Germany, Greece, Iceland, Ireland, Liechtenstein, Luxembourg, Malta, Mexico, the Netherlands, New Zealand, Norway, Portugal, Slovenia, South Africa, Spain, Sweden, Switzerland, Taiwan, Thailand, the United Kingdom, the United States, and Uruguay.

As of 18 November 2026, legislation to allow same-sex marriage is pending or considered in at least one legislative house on a national level in Japan.

Country	Date	Same-sex union	Upper house		Lower house		Head of state	Law enacted?
Country	Date	Same-sex union	Yes	No	Yes	No	Head of state	Law enacted?
Netherlands	June 1979	Unregistered cohabitation	Passed		Passed		Signed	Yes Yes
Netherlands	December 1980	Unregistered cohabitation (expansion)	Passed		Passed		Signed	Yes Yes
Netherlands	November 1984	Unregistered cohabitation (expansion)	Passed		Passed		Signed	Yes Yes
Denmark	June 1986	Unregistered cohabitation	—N/a		78	62	Signed	Yes Yes
Sweden	June 1987	Unregistered cohabitation	—N/a		Passed		—N/a (Note: According to the 1974 Constitution, the King of Sweden is head of state but does not sign or veto any laws enacted by Parliament.)ed	Yes Yes
Denmark	June 1989	Registered partnership	—N/a		71	47	Signed	Yes Yes (Note: Replaced by the gender-neutral marriage law.)
Norway	July 1991	Unregistered cohabitation	Passed		Passed		Signed	Yes Yes
Norway	April 1993	Registered partnership	18	16	58	40	Signed	Yes Yes
Sweden	June 1994	Registered partnership	—N/a		171	141	—N/a	Yes Yes
Spain	November 1994	Unregistered cohabitation	Passed		Passed		Signed	Yes Yes
Hungary	May 1996	Unregistered cohabitation	—N/a		207	73	Signed	Yes Yes
Iceland	June 1996	Confirmed cohabitation	—N/a		44	1	Signed	Yes Yes
Slovakia	May 1997	Registered partnership	—N/a		Failed		—	No No
Netherlands	July 1997	Registered partnership	Passed		Passed		Signed	Yes Yes
Czech Republic	June 1998	Registered partnership	—	—	Failed		—	No No
France	October 1998	Civil solidarity pact	—	—	Failed		—	No No
Belgium	January 1999	Legal cohabitation	39	8	98	10	Signed	Yes Yes
Sweden	March 1999	Registered partnership (expansion)	—N/a		Passed		—N/a	Yes Yes
Denmark	June 1999	Registered partnership (expansion: adoption rights)	—N/a		61	48	Signed	Yes Yes
France	November 1999	Civil solidarity pact	Passed		315	249	Signed	Yes Yes
Czech Republic	December 1999	Registered partnership	—	—	69	91	—	No No
Slovakia	February 2000	Registered partnership	—N/a		Failed		—	No No
Canada	April 2000	Common-law partnership	Passed		174	72	Signed	Yes Yes
Iceland	May 2000	Confirmed cohabitation (expansion: adoption and immigration rights)	—N/a		49	1	Signed	Yes Yes
Netherlands	December 2000	Marriage	49	26	109	33	Signed	Yes Yes
Norway	December 2000	Registered partnership (expansion)	Passed		Passed		Signed	Yes Yes
Germany	February 2001	Registered life partnership	Passed		Passed		Signed	Yes Yes
Portugal	March 2001	De facto union	—N/a		Passed		Signed	Yes Yes
New Zealand	April 2001	De facto relationship	—N/a		Passed		Signed	Yes Yes
Czech Republic	April 2001	Unregistered cohabitation	Passed		Passed		Signed	Yes Yes
Norway	June 2001	Registered partnership (expansion: adoption rights)	Passed		Passed		Signed	Yes Yes
Finland	September 2001	Registered partnership	—N/a		99	84	Signed	Yes Yes
Czech Republic	October 2001	Registered partnership	—	—	Failed		—	No No
Sweden	June 2002	Registered partnership (expansion: adoption rights)	—N/a		Passed		—N/a	Yes Yes
Belgium	February 2003	Marriage	46	15	91	22	Signed	Yes Yes
Denmark	May 2003	Registered partnership (expansion)	—N/a		49	60	—	No No
Denmark	May 2003	Registered partnership (expansion)	—N/a		45	60	—	No No
Denmark	May 2003	Registered partnership (expansion)	—N/a		43	61	—	No No
Denmark	June 2003	Registered partnership (expansion)	—N/a		11	94	—	No No
Croatia	July 2003	Unregistered cohabitation	—N/a		Passed		Signed	Yes Yes
Luxembourg	May 2004	Free union	—N/a		Failed		—	No No
Luxembourg	May 2004	Marriage	—N/a		Failed		—	No No
Luxembourg	July 2004	Partnership	—N/a		33	7	Signed	Yes Yes
Panama	September 2004	Civil union	—N/a		Failed		—	No No
Germany	October 2004	Registered life partnership (expansion: adoption rights)	Passed		Passed		Signed	Yes Yes
Norway	November 2004	Marriage	—N/a		Failed		—	No No
United Kingdom	November 2004	Civil partnership	251	136	426	49	Signed	Yes Yes
New Zealand	November 2004	De facto relationship (expansion)	—N/a		Passed		Signed	Yes Yes
New Zealand	December 2004	Civil union	—N/a		65	55	Signed	Yes Yes
Czech Republic	February 2005	Registered partnership	—	—	Failed		—	No No
Andorra	March 2005	Stable couple union	—N/a		Passed		Signed (Note: Only one of the two Co-Princes of Andorra signed the law.)	Yes Yes
Slovenia	March 2005	Registered partnership	—N/a (Note: The Slovenian Parliament is incompletely bicameral.)		Failed		—	No No
New Zealand	March 2005	Civil union and de facto relationship (expansion)	—N/a		76	43	Signed	Yes Yes
Sweden	June 2005	Registered partnership (expansion)	—N/a		Passed		—N/a	Yes Yes
Switzerland	June 2005	Registered partnership	Passed		Passed		—N/a	Yes Yes
Switzerland	June 2005	Registered partnership	Specific referendum (58.04%)				—N/a	Yes Yes
Spain	July 2005	Marriage	Vetoed (Note: The Spanish Senate voted 131 "yes" to 119 "no" to veto the law. The veto was later overridden by the Spanish Congress of Deputies.)		183	136	Signed	Yes Yes
Canada	July 2005	Marriage	47	21	158	133	Signed	Yes Yes
Slovenia	July 2005	Partnership	—N/a		44	3	Signed	Yes Yes
Croatia	October 2005	Registered partnership	—N/a		Failed		—	No No
Czech Republic	March 2006	Registered partnership	65	14	86	54	Vetoed (Note: Veto overridden.)	Yes Yes
Belgium	May 2006	Marriage (expansion: adoption rights)	34	33	77	62	Signed	Yes Yes
Spain	May 2006	Marriage (expansion: medically assisted reproduction)	Passed		Passed		Signed	Yes Yes
Denmark	June 2006	Registered partnership (expansion)	—N/a		Passed		Signed	Yes Yes
Iceland	June 2006	Confirmed cohabitation (expansion)	—N/a		41	0	Signed	Yes Yes
France	June 2006	Civil Solidarity Pact (expansion)	Passed		Passed		Signed	Yes Yes
South Africa	November 2006	Marriage and civil partnership	36	11	229	41	Signed	Yes Yes
Portugal	December 2006	De facto union (expansion: immigration rights)	—N/a		Passed		Signed	Yes Yes
Finland	December 2006	Registered partnership (expansion)	—N/a		Passed		Signed	Yes Yes
Spain	March 2007	Marriage (expansion: automatic co-parenthood)	Passed		Passed		Signed	Yes Yes
Colombia	June 2007	Civil union	29	34	62	43	—	No No
Hungary	December 2007	Registered partnership	—N/a		185	154	Signed	No No (Note: Ruled unconstitutional.)
Uruguay	December 2007	Cohabitation union	17	5	Passed		Signed	Yes Yes
Iceland	May 2008	Confirmed cohabitation (expansion)	—N/a		54	0	Signed	Yes Yes
Norway	June 2008	Marriage	23	17	84	41	Signed	Yes Yes
Ecuador	September 2008	De facto union	General constitutional referendum (69.46%)					Yes Yes
Portugal	October 2008	Marriage	—N/a		Failed		—	No No
Portugal	October 2008	Marriage	—N/a		Failed		—	No No
United Kingdom	November 2008	Civil partnership (expansion)	Passed		Passed		Signed	Yes Yes
Australia	November 2008	De facto relationship	Passed		Passed		Signed	Yes Yes
Sweden	April 2009	Marriage	—N/a		261	22	—N/a	Yes Yes
Hungary	April 2009	Registered partnership	—N/a		199	159	Signed	Yes Yes
France	May 2009	Recognition of unions performed abroad as PACS	Passed		Passed		Signed	Yes Yes
Finland	May 2009	Registered partnership (expansion: adoption rights)	—N/a		108	29	Signed	Yes Yes
Denmark	June 2009	Registered partnership (expansion)	—N/a		107	2	Signed	Yes Yes
Portugal	August 2009	De facto union (expansion: inheritance rights)	—N/a		Passed		Vetoed	No No
Uruguay	September 2009	Cohabitation union (expansion: adoption rights)	17	6	40	13	Signed	Yes Yes
Austria	December 2009	Registered partnership	44	8	110	64	Signed	Yes Yes
Portugal	January 2010	Marriage	—N/a		Failed		—	No No
Portugal	January 2010	Marriage	—N/a		Failed		—	No No
Portugal	January 2010	Registered civil union	—N/a		Failed		—	No No
Australia	February 2010	Marriage	5	45	—	—	—	No No
Portugal	May 2010	Marriage	—N/a		Passed		Signed	Yes Yes
Denmark	May 2010	Registered partnership (expansion: adoption rights)	—N/a		60	54	Signed	Yes Yes
Denmark	June 2010	Marriage	—N/a		52	57	—	No No
Iceland	June 2010	Marriage	—N/a		49	0	Signed	Yes Yes
(Republic of Ireland) Ireland	July 2010	Civil partnership and unregistered cohabitation	48	4	Passed		Signed	Yes Yes
Argentina	July 2010	Marriage	33	27	126	110	Signed	Yes Yes
Luxembourg	August 2010	Partnership (expansion)	—N/a		Passed		Signed	Yes Yes
Portugal	August 2010	De facto union (expansion: inheritance rights)	—N/a		Passed		Signed	Yes Yes
Germany	September 2010	Marriage	Failed		—		—	No No
Germany	October 2010	Registered life partnership (expansion: tax law)	—		Failed		—	No No
Germany	April 2011	Registered life partnership (expansion: tax law and adoption rights)	Failed		—		—	No No
Liechtenstein	June 2011	Registered partnership	—N/a		Passed		Signed	Yes Yes
Liechtenstein	June 2011	Registered partnership	Specific referendum (68.76%)				Signed	Yes Yes
France	June 2011	Marriage	—	—	222	293	—	No No
Germany	June 2011	Registered life partnership (expansion: tax law)	Failed		—		—	No No
Portugal	February 2012	Marriage (expansion: adoption rights)	—N/a		Failed		—	No No
Portugal	February 2012	Marriage (expansion: adoption rights)	—N/a		Failed		—	No No
Slovenia	March 2012	Partnership (expansion)	Specific referendum (45.36%)					No No
Israel	May 2012	Marriage	—N/a		11	39	—	No No
Denmark	June 2012	Marriage	—N/a		85	24	Signed	Yes Yes
Germany	June 2012	Marriage	—	—	260	309	—	No No
San Marino	June 2012	Unregistered cohabitation (only one entitlement)	—N/a		33	20	Signed	Yes Yes
Australia	September 2012	Marriage	—	—	42	98	—	No No
Australia	September 2012	Marriage	26	41	—	—	—	No No
Germany	October 2012	Registered life partnership (expansion: tax law)	—	—	253	288	—	No No
Slovakia	November 2012	Registered partnership	—N/a		14	94	—	No No
Poland	January 2013	Registered partnership	—	—	Failed		—	No No
Poland	January 2013	Registered partnership	—	—	Failed		—	No No
Poland	January 2013	Registered partnership	—	—	Failed		—	No No
Poland	January 2013	Registered partnership	—	—	Failed		—	No No
Poland	January 2013	Partnership agreement	—	—	Failed		—	No No
Germany	March 2013	Registered life partnership (expansion: tax law)	Passed		—	—	—	No No
Germany	March 2013	Marriage	Passed		—	—	—	No No
New Zealand	April 2013	Marriage	—N/a		77	44	Signed	Yes Yes
Colombia	April 2013	Marriage	17	51	—	—	—	No No
Uruguay	May 2013	Marriage	23	8	71	21	Signed	Yes Yes
Portugal	May 2013	Marriage (expansion: adoption rights)	—N/a		77	104	—	No No
Portugal	May 2013	Marriage (expansion: adoption rights)	—N/a		Failed		—	No No
Portugal	May 2013	Marriage (expansion: adoption rights)	—N/a		Failed		—	No No
France	May 2013	Marriage	171	165	331	225	Signed	Yes Yes
Australia	June 2013	Recognition of marriage performed abroad	28	44	—	—	—	No No
Germany	July 2013	Registered life partnership (expansion: tax law)	Passed		Passed		Signed	Yes Yes
United Kingdom (England and Wales)	July 2013	Marriage	Passed		366	161	Signed	Yes Yes
Austria	July 2013	Registered partnership (expansion: adoption rights)	45	8	Passed		Signed	Yes Yes
Philippines	October 2013	Registered partnership	—N/a		Failed		—	No No
Netherlands	December 2013	Marriage (expansion: automatic co-parenthood)	Passed		Passed		Signed	Yes Yes
Portugal	March 2014	Marriage (expansion: adoption rights)	—N/a		107	112	—	No No
Malta	April 2014	Civil union	—N/a		37	0	Signed	Yes Yes
Belgium	May 2014	Marriage (expansion: automatic co-parenthood)	48	2	114	10	Signed	Yes Yes
Germany	May 2014	Registered life partnership (expansion: adoption rights)	—	—	111	432	—	No No
Andorra	May 2014	Marriage	—N/a		6	21	—	No No
Germany	June 2014	Registered life partnership (expansion: adoption rights)	Passed		Passed		Signed	Yes Yes
Romania	June 2014	Civil partnership	2	110	4	298	—	No No
Luxembourg	June 2014	Marriage	—N/a		56	4	—N/a (Note: Since the 2008 constitutional change, the assent of the Grand Duke of Luxembourg is not required for the enactment of laws adopted by the Parliament.)	Yes Yes
Croatia	July 2014	Life partnership	—N/a		89	16	—N/a (Note: The President merely promulgates the laws adopted by the Parliament.)	Yes Yes
Germany	July 2014	Registered life partnership (expansion: tax law)	Passed		Passed		Signed	Yes Yes
San Marino	September 2014	Recognition of marriage performed abroad	—N/a		15	35	—	No No
Argentina	October 2014	Cohabitation union	Passed		Passed		Signed	Yes Yes
Andorra	December 2014	Civil union	—N/a		20	3	Signed	Yes Yes
Portugal	January 2015	Marriage (expansion: adoption rights)	—N/a		89	119	—	No No
Portugal	January 2015	Marriage (expansion: adoption rights)	—N/a		91	119	—	No No
Portugal	January 2015	Marriage (expansion: adoption rights)	—N/a		91	120	—	No No
Portugal	January 2015	Marriage (expansion: medically assisted reproduction)	—N/a		Failed		—	No No
(Republic of Ireland) Ireland	April 2015	Civil partnership and unregistered cohabitation (expansion: step-adoption rights)	20	2	Passed		Signed	Yes Yes
Chile	April 2015	Civil union agreement	25	6	78	9	Signed	Yes Yes
Ecuador	June 2015	De facto union (expansion)	—N/a		89	1	Signed	Yes Yes
Israel	July 2015	Civil union	—N/a		39	50	—	No No
Israel	July 2015	Marriage	—N/a		39	50	—	No No
(Republic of Ireland) Ireland	August 2015	Marriage (constitutional amendment)	29	3	Passed		Signed	Yes Yes
(Republic of Ireland) Ireland	August 2015	Marriage (constitutional amendment)	Specific constitutional referendum (62.07%)				Signed	Yes Yes
(Republic of Ireland) Ireland	October 2015	Marriage (statutory legislation)	Passed		Passed		Signed	Yes Yes
Germany	November 2015	Registered life partnership (expansion)	Passed		Passed		Signed	Yes Yes
Cyprus	December 2015	Civil cohabitation	—N/a		39	12	Signed	Yes Yes
Romania	December 2015	Civil partnership	8	49	Failed		—	No No
Slovenia	December 2015	Marriage	—N/a		51	28	—	No No
Slovenia	December 2015	Marriage	Specific referendum (36.53%)				—	No No
Greece	December 2015	Cohabitation agreement	—N/a		194	55	Signed	Yes Yes
Estonia	October 2014	Cohabitation agreement (framework law)	—N/a		40	38	Signed	Yes Yes
Estonia	January 2016	Cohabitation agreement (implementation law)	—N/a		Failed		—	No No
Portugal	February 2016	Marriage and de facto union (expansion: adoption rights)	—N/a		Passed		Vetoed	Yes Yes
Israel	February 2016	Civil union	—N/a		40	47	—	No No
Switzerland	March 2016	Registered partnership (expansion: immigration rights)	—	—	122	62	—	No No
Luxembourg	April 2016	Recognition of marriage performed abroad before 1 January 2015	—N/a		50	3	—N/a	Yes Yes
Slovenia	April 2016	Partnership (expansion)	—N/a		54	15	—N/a	Yes Yes
Italy	May 2016	Civil union and cohabitation agreement	173	71	372	51	Signed	Yes Yes
Portugal	June 2016	Marriage and de facto union (expansion: medically assisted reproduction)	—N/a		Passed		Signed	Yes Yes
Switzerland	June 2016	Registered partnership (expansion: adoption rights)	25	14	125	68	—N/a	Yes Yes
Liechtenstein	November 2016	Registered partnership (expansion)	—N/a		25	0	Signed	Yes Yes
Greece	December 2016	Cohabitation agreement (expansion)	—N/a		201	21	Signed	Yes Yes
Austria	December 2016	Registered partnership (expansion)	Passed		Passed		Signed	Yes Yes
Finland	February 2015	Marriage (framework law)	—N/a		101	90	Signed	Yes Yes
Finland	April 2016	Marriage (implementation laws)	—N/a		106	42	Signed	Yes Yes
Finland	January 2017	Marriage (implementation laws)	—N/a		128	28	Signed	Yes Yes
Malta	April 2017	Cohabitation	—N/a		Passed		Signed	Yes Yes
Lithuania	June 2017	Partnership	—N/a		29	59	—	No No
(Republic of Ireland) Ireland	July 2017	Civil partnership and unregistered cohabitation (expansion: adoption rights)	Passed		Passed		Signed	Yes Yes
Germany	July 2017	Marriage	Passed		393	226	Signed	Yes Yes
Malta	August 2017	Marriage	—N/a		66	1	Signed	Yes Yes
Philippines	October 2017	Civil partnership	—N/a		Failed		—	No No
Chile	November 2017	Civil union agreement (expansion)	15	0	70	0	Signed	Yes Yes
Australia	December 2017	Marriage	43	12	131	4	Signed	Yes Yes
Finland	April 2018	Marriage (expansion: automatic co-parenthood)	—N/a		122	42	Signed	Yes Yes
Greece	May 2018	Cohabitation agreement (expansion: foster care)	—N/a		Passed		Signed	Yes Yes
Israel	June 2018	Marriage	—N/a		39	42	—	No No
Malta	June 2018	Marriage, civil union and cohabitation (expansion: medically assisted reproduction)	—N/a		34	27	Signed	Yes Yes
Slovakia	September 2018	Registered partnership	—N/a		Failed		—	No No
San Marino	November 2018	Civil union	—N/a		40	4	Signed	Yes Yes
Mexico	November 2018	Marriage (codification of federal recognition)	110	0	415	0	Published	Yes Yes
Cuba	December 2018	Marriage	—N/a		Failed		—	No No
Germany	December 2018	Marriage (codification)	Passed		Passed		Signed	Yes Yes
Romania	March 2019	Civil partnership	2	68	Failed		—	No No
Taiwan	May 2019	Permanent union	—N/a		66	27	Signed	Yes Yes
Philippines	July 2019	Civil partnership	—N/a		Failed		—	No No
Philippines	July 2019	Registered partnership	Failed		—N/a		—	No No
Austria	July 2019	Marriage (expansion)	Passed		Passed		—N/a	Yes Yes
United Kingdom (Northern Ireland)	July 2019	Marriage	Passed		328	65	Signed	Yes Yes
Montenegro	July 2019	Life partnership	—N/a		38	4	—	No No
Monaco	December 2019	Cohabitation agreement	—N/a		Passed		Signed	Yes Yes
Montenegro	July 2020	Life partnership	—N/a		42	5	Signed	Yes Yes
Lithuania	May 2021	Partnership	—N/a		63	58	—	No No
San Marino	June 2021	Civil union (expansion)	—N/a		31	1	Signed	Yes Yes
France	August 2021	Marriage (expansion: medically assisted reproduction)	326	115	Passed		Signed	Yes Yes
Switzerland	September 2021	Marriage	22	15	132	52	—N/a	Yes Yes
Switzerland	September 2021	Marriage	Specific referendum (64.10%)					Yes Yes
Chile	December 2021	Marriage	21	8	80	20	Signed	Yes Yes
France	February 2022	Adoption (expansion to PACS)	Passed		96	15	Signed	Yes Yes
Costa Rica	May 2022	De facto union	—N/a		Passed		Signed	Yes Yes
Andorra	August 2022	Marriage	—N/a		18	6	Signed	Yes Yes
Cuba	July 2022	Marriage and civil union	—N/a		Passed		Signed	Yes Yes
Cuba	September 2022	Marriage and civil union	Specific Referendum (66.87%)					Yes Yes
Slovenia	October 2022	Marriage and adoption rights (codification)	17	11	48	29	Suspensory Veto	Yes Yes
Slovenia	October 2022	Marriage and adoption rights (codification)	—N/a		51	24	Published	Yes Yes
Slovakia	October 2022	Civil cohabitation	—N/a		31	53	—	No No
United States	December 2022	Marriage (codification of federal recognition; requiring states and territories to recognize)	61	36	259	168	Signed	Yes Yes
Latvia	December 2022	Civil union	—N/a		—		Failed	No No
Peru	December 2022	Marriage	—N/a		—		Failed	No No
Andorra	January 2023	Marriage (codification)	—N/a		23	1	Signed	Yes Yes
Taiwan	June 2023	Permanent union (expansion: adoption rights)	—N/a		Passed		Signed	Yes Yes
Estonia	June 2023	Marriage	—N/a		55	34	Signed	Yes Yes
Latvia	January 2024	Partnership	—N/a		53	43	Signed	Yes Yes
Greece	February 2024	Marriage	—N/a		175	77	Signed	Yes Yes
Czech Republic	April 2024	Partnership	Passed		123	36	Signed	Yes Yes
Liechtenstein	May 2024	Marriage	—N/a		24	1	Signed	Yes Yes
Thailand	June 2024	Marriage	130	4	400	10	Signed	Yes Yes
Serbia	November 2024	Civil union	26		Failed		—	No No
Kosovo	Unknown	Civil union	—N/a		Proposed			
Peru	Unknown	Civil union	—N/a		—		Proposed	
Poland	July 2026	Closest person agreement	55	29	230	198	Vetoed	No No

=== Sub-national level ===
In countries with a federal system of governance, states and territories often may grant recognition to same-sex couples in their own jurisdictions, although unitary states with a level of devolution, such as Spain or the United Kingdom, also offer such powers to local authorities. The first jurisdiction to enact unregistered cohabitation was British Columbia in Canada in July 1992. The first jurisdiction to legalize registered partnership was Greenland as part of the Kingdom of Denmark in April 1996. Finally, the first sub-national jurisdiction to legalize same-sex marriage was the Canadian province of Ontario in June 2003.

As of 18 November 2026, there are 33 sub-national jurisdictions worldwide that have legalized some kind of alternative form of legal union of same-sex couples other than marriage. Those are:

- In Japan:
  - 31 prefectures of Japan (Aichi, Akita, Aomori, Fukui, Fukuoka, Fukushima, Gifu, Gunma, Hyōgo, Ibaraki, Kagawa, Mie, Nagano, Nara, Niigata, Okinawa, Osaka, Ōita, Saga, Shiga, Shimane, Shizuoka, Tochigi, Tokushima, Tokyo, Tottori, Toyama, Wakayama, Yamagata, Yamaguchi, and Yamanashi);
- Two British overseas territories (Bermuda, Cayman Islands).

For the time being, 63 sub-national jurisdictions worldwide have legalized same-sex marriage in nations where same-sex marriage is not legal throughout the nation's territory. Those are:

- Fifty-one Native American Tribal Nations, namely the Ak-Chin Indian Community, the Bay Mills Indian Community, the Blackfeet Nation, the Blue Lake Rancheria, the Central Council of the Tlingit and Haida Indian Tribes of Alaska, the Cherokee Nation, the Cheyenne and Arapaho Tribes, the Chickasaw Nation, the Choctaw Nation, the Colorado River Indian Tribes, the Confederated Tribes of Coos, Lower Umpqua and Siuslaw Indians, the Confederated Tribes of Siletz Indians, the Confederated Tribes of the Colville Reservation, Confederated Tribes of the Grand Ronde Community of Oregon, the Coquille Indian Tribe, the Eastern Shoshone Tribe, the Fond du Lac Band of Lake Superior Chippewa, the Fort McDermitt Paiute and Shoshone Tribes, the Fort McDowell Yavapai Nation, the Grand Portage Band of Chippewa, the Grand Traverse Band of Ottawa and Chippewa Indians, the Hannahville Indian Community, the Ho-Chunk Nation of Wisconsin, the Iipay Nation of Santa Ysabel, the Keweenaw Bay Indian Community, the Lac du Flambeau Band of Lake Superior Chippewa, the Leech Lake Band of Ojibwe, the Little Traverse Bay Bands of Odawa Indians, the Mashantucket Pequot Tribal Nation, the Menominee Indian Tribe of Wisconsin, the Northern Arapaho Tribe, the Oglala Sioux Tribe, the Oneida Nation of Wisconsin, the Osage Nation, the Pascua Yaqui Tribe, the Pokagon Band of Potawatomi Indians, the Ponca Tribe of Nebraska, the Port Gamble S'Klallam Tribe, the Prairie Island Indian Community, the Puyallup Tribe of Indians, the Salt River Pima-Maricopa Indian Community, the San Carlos Apache Tribe, the Sault Ste. Marie Tribe of Chippewa Indians, the St. Regis Mohawk Tribe, the Stockbridge-Munsee Community, the Suquamish Tribe, the Tulalip, the Turtle Mountain Band of Chippewa Indians of North Dakota, the White Mountain Apache Tribe, the Winnebago Tribe of Nebraska, and the Yavapai-Apache Nation.
- The British Overseas Territories of Akrotiri and Dhekelia, the British Antarctic Territory, the British Indian Ocean Territory, the Falkland Islands, Gibraltar, the Pitcairn Islands, Saint Helena, Ascension and Tristan da Cunha, and South Georgia and the South Sandwich Islands, and the British Crown dependencies of Guernsey, the Isle of Man and Jersey, and Guernsey's own dependencies of Alderney and Sark.
- Aruba and Curaçao, constituent countries of the Kingdom of the Netherlands.

State/Territory	Country	Date	Same-sex union	Upper House		Lower house		Head of State	Law enacted?
State/Territory	Country	Date	Same-sex union	Yes	No	Yes	No	Head of State	Law enacted?
British Columbia	Canada	July 1992	Marriage-like relationship	—N/a		30	17	Signed	Yes Yes
British Columbia	Canada	July 1993	Marriage-like relationship (expansion)	—N/a		Passed		Signed	Yes Yes
British Columbia	Canada	July 1993	Marriage-like relationship (expansion)	—N/a		Passed		Signed	Yes Yes
British Columbia	Canada	July 1993	Marriage-like relationship (expansion)	—N/a		Passed		Signed	Yes Yes
Australian Capital Territory	Australia	May 1994	Domestic relationship	—N/a		Passed		Signed	Yes Yes
Ontario	Canada	June 1994	Domestic partnership	—N/a		58	69	—	No No
British Columbia	Canada	June 1995	Marriage-like relationship (expansion)	—N/a		Passed		Signed	Yes Yes
British Columbia	Canada	July 1995	Marriage-like relationship (expansion: adoption rights)	—N/a		Passed		Signed	Yes Yes
Greenland	Denmark	May 1993	Inatsisartut: Registered partnership (resolution)	—N/a		15	0	—N/a	Yes Yes
Greenland	Denmark	April 1996	Folketing: Registered partnership (statutory law)	—N/a		104	1	Signed	Yes Yes
Ceuta	Spain	April 1997	De facto union	—N/a		Passed		Signed	Yes Yes
British Columbia	Canada	July 1997	Marriage-like relationship (expansion)	—N/a		Passed		Signed	Yes Yes
Catalonia	Spain	June 1998	Stable couple union	—N/a		Passed		Signed	Yes Yes
Yukon	Canada	December 1998	Unregistered cohabitation	—N/a		Passed		Signed	Yes Yes
Aragon	Spain	March 1999	Stable non-married couple	—N/a		Passed		Signed	Yes Yes
Yukon	Canada	April 1999	Unregistered cohabitation (expansion)	—N/a		Passed		Signed	Yes Yes
Alberta	Canada	May 1999	Unregistered cohabitation	—N/a		Passed		Signed	Yes Yes
Quebec	Canada	May 1999	De facto union	—N/a		80	0	Signed	Yes Yes
New South Wales	Australia	June 1999	De facto relationship	Passed		Passed		Signed	Yes Yes
British Columbia	Canada	July 1999	Marriage-like relationship (expansion)	—N/a		Passed		Signed	Yes Yes
Ontario	Canada	October 1999	Conjugal relationship	—N/a		Passed		Signed	Yes Yes
Navarre	Spain	July 2000	Stable couple	—N/a		Passed		Signed	Yes Yes
(Castilla–La Mancha) Castile-La Mancha	Spain	July 2000	De facto couple	—N/a		Passed		Signed	Yes Yes
British Columbia	Canada	July 2000	Marriage-like relationship (expansion)	—N/a		Passed		Signed	Yes Yes
Australian Capital Territory	Australia	August 2000	Domestic relationship (expansion)	—N/a		Passed		Signed	Yes Yes
Nova Scotia	Canada	November 2000	Domestic partnership	—N/a		Passed		Signed	Yes Yes
Newfoundland and Labrador	Canada	December 2000	Conjugal relationship	—N/a		Passed		Signed	Yes Yes
New Brunswick	Canada	December 2000	Family relationship	—N/a		Passed		Signed	Yes Yes
(Canton of Geneva) Geneva	Switzerland	February 2001	Registered partnership	—N/a		Passed		Signed	Yes Yes
(Valencian Community) Valencia	Spain	April 2001	De facto union	—N/a		Passed		Signed	Yes Yes
(Victoria (state)) Victoria	Australia	June 2001	Domestic relationship	Passed		Passed		Signed	Yes Yes
Manitoba	Canada	July 2001	Common-law relationships	—N/a		Passed		Signed	Yes Yes
Saskatchewan	Canada	July 2001	Spousal relationship	—N/a		Passed		Signed	Yes Yes
Saskatchewan	Canada	July 2001	Spousal relationship (expansion: adoption rights)	—N/a		Passed		Signed	Yes Yes
(Victoria (state)) Victoria	Australia	November 2001	Domestic relationship (expansion)	Passed		Passed		Signed	Yes Yes
Newfoundland and Labrador	Canada	December 2001	Conjugal relationship (expansion)	—N/a		Passed		Signed	Yes Yes
Balearic Islands	Spain	December 2001	Stable couple	—N/a		Passed		Signed	Yes Yes
(Community of Madrid) Madrid	Spain	December 2001	De facto union	—N/a		Passed		Signed	Yes Yes
Newfoundland and Labrador	Canada	April 2002	Conjugal relationship (expansion: adoption rights)	—N/a		Passed		Signed	Yes Yes
Western Australia	Australia	April 2002	De facto relationship	Passed		Passed		Signed	Yes Yes
Yukon	Canada	May 2002	Unregistered cohabitation (expansion: adoption rights)	—N/a		Passed		Signed	Yes Yes
Asturias	Spain	May 2002	Stable couple	—N/a		Passed		Signed	Yes Yes
Northwest Territories	Canada	June 2002	Unregistered cohabitation	—N/a		Passed		Signed	Yes Yes
Quebec	Canada	June 2002	Civil union	—N/a		87	0	Signed	Yes Yes
Manitoba	Canada	August 2002	Common-law relationship (expansion: adoption rights)	—N/a		Passed		Signed	Yes Yes
Manitoba	Canada	August 2002	Common-law relationship (expansion)	—N/a		Passed		Signed	Yes Yes
(Canton of Zurich) Zürich	Switzerland	September 2002	Registered partnership	Specific cantonal referendum (62.70%)					Yes Yes
New South Wales	Australia	October 2002	De facto relationship (expansion)	Passed		Passed		Signed	Yes Yes
Castile and León	Spain	October 2002	De facto union	—N/a		Passed		Signed	Yes Yes
Alberta	Canada	December 2002	Adult interdependent relationship	—N/a		Passed		Signed	Yes Yes
Queensland	Australia	December 2002	De facto relationship	—N/a		Passed		Signed	Yes Yes
Andalusia	Spain	December 2002	De facto couple	—N/a		Passed		Signed	Yes Yes
Prince Edward Island	Canada	December 2002	Unregistered cohabitation	—N/a		Passed		Signed	Yes Yes
Autonomous City of Buenos Aires	Argentina	January 2003	Civil union	—N/a		29	10	Signed	Yes Yes
Canary Islands	Spain	March 2003	De facto couple	—N/a		Passed		Signed	Yes Yes
Extremadura	Spain	March 2003	De facto couple	—N/a		Passed		Signed	Yes Yes
(Basque Country (autonomous community)) Basque Country	Spain	May 2003	De facto couple	—N/a		Passed		Signed	Yes Yes
(Río Negro Province) Río Negro	Argentina	May 2003	Civil union	—N/a		Passed		Signed	Yes Yes
South Australia	Australia	June 2003	Unregistered cohabitation	Passed		Passed		Signed	Yes Yes
Tasmania	Australia	September 2003	Significant relationship and caring relationship	Passed		Passed		Signed	Yes Yes
Australian Capital Territory	Australia	January 2004	Domestic relationship (expansion: adoption rights)	—N/a		Passed		Signed	Yes Yes
(Canton of Neuchâtel) Neuchâtel	Switzerland	January 2004	Registered partnership	—N/a		65	38	Signed	Yes Yes
Northern Territory	Australia	January 2004	De facto relationship	—N/a		Passed		Signed	Yes Yes
Aragon	Spain	May 2004	Stable non-married couple (expansion: adoption rights)	—N/a		Passed		Signed	Yes Yes
(Canton of Fribourg) Fribourg	Switzerland	May 2004	Registered partnership	General cantonal referendum (58.03%)					Yes Yes
City of Sydney	Australia	July 2004	Relationship declaration program	—N/a		Passed		Signed	Yes Yes
Quebec	Canada	November 2004	Marriage (codification)	—N/a		Passed		Signed	Yes Yes
Ontario	Canada	March 2005	Marriage (codification)	—N/a		Passed		Signed	Yes Yes
Northwest Territories	Canada	March 2005	Unregistered cohabitation (expansion)	—N/a		Passed		Signed	Yes Yes
Catalonia	Spain	April 2005	Stable couple union (expansion: adoption rights)	—N/a		Passed		Signed	Yes Yes
Cantabria	Spain	May 2005	De facto couple	—N/a		Passed		Signed	Yes Yes
Akrotiri and Dhekelia	United Kingdom	November 2005	Civil partnership	—N/a				Signed	Yes Yes
Isle of Man	United Kingdom	November 2005	Recognition of civil partnership performed in the United Kingdom	—N/a		Passed		Signed	Yes Yes
Norfolk Island	Australia	February 2006	De facto relationship	—N/a		Passed		Signed	Yes Yes
Australian Capital Territory	Australia	June 2006	Civil union	—N/a		Passed		Signed	No No (Note: Legislation overturned by the Australian Federal Government.)
Mexico City	Mexico	November 2006	Coexistence partnership	—N/a		43	17	Signed	Yes Yes
South Australia	Australia	December 2006	Domestic partnership agreement	Passed		Passed		Signed	Yes Yes
Coahuila	Mexico	January 2007	Civil pact of solidarity	—N/a		20	13	Signed	Yes Yes
Scotland	United Kingdom	January 2007	Civil partnership (expansion: adoption rights)	—N/a		101	6	Signed	Yes Yes
Australian Capital Territory	Australia	February 2007	Civil partnership	—N/a		Passed		Signed	No No
Alberta	Canada	February 2007	Marriage (expansion: adoption rights)	—N/a		Passed		Signed	Yes Yes
New Brunswick	Canada	March 2007	Marriage (expansion: adoption rights)	—N/a		Passed		Signed	Yes Yes
(Victoria (state)) City of Melbourne	Australia	April 2007	Relationship declaration program	—N/a		Passed		Signed	Yes Yes
(Victoria (state)) City of Yarra	Australia	May 2007	Relationship declaration program	—N/a		Passed		Signed	Yes Yes
(Argentina) Villa Carlos Paz	Argentina	November 2007	Civil union	—N/a		12	6	Signed	Yes Yes
New South Wales	Australia	November 2007	De facto relationship (expansion)	Passed		Passed		Signed	Yes Yes
(Galicia (Spain)) Galicia	Spain	December 2007	De facto couple	—N/a		Passed		Signed	Yes Yes
Melilla	Spain	January 2008	De facto couple	—N/a		Passed		Signed	Yes Yes
(Victoria (state)) Victoria	Australia	April 2008	Registered domestic relationship	29	10	54	24	Signed	Yes Yes
Australian Capital Territory	Australia	May 2008	Civil partnership	—N/a		Passed		Signed	Yes Yes
Prince Edward Island	Canada	May 2008	Marriage (codification and expansion: adoption rights)	—N/a		Passed		Signed	Yes Yes
New South Wales	Australia	June 2008	De facto relationship (expansion)	Passed		64	11	Signed	Yes Yes
Manitoba	Canada	October 2008	Marriage (codification)	—N/a		Passed		Signed	Yes Yes
(Victoria (state)) Victoria	Australia	December 2008	Registered domestic relationship (expansion)	Passed		47	34	Signed	Yes Yes
(New South Wales) Municipality of Woollahra	Australia	December 2008	Relationship declaration program	—N/a		Passed		Signed	Yes Yes
New Brunswick	Canada	December 2008	Marriage (codification) and family relationship (expansion)	—N/a		Passed		Signed	Yes Yes
Río Cuarto	Argentina	May 2009	Civil union	—N/a		Passed		Signed	Yes Yes
Greenland	Denmark	May 2009	Registered partnership (expansion: adoption rights)	—N/a		Passed		Signed	Yes Yes
New Caledonia	France	May 2009	Civil solidarity pact and concubinage	Passed		Passed		Signed	Yes Yes
Wallis and Futuna	France	May 2009	Civil solidarity pact and concubinage	Passed		Passed		Signed	Yes Yes
Newfoundland and Labrador	Canada	May 2009	Marriage (codification)	—N/a		Passed		Signed	Yes Yes
Scotland	United Kingdom	June 2009	Civil partnership (expansion)	—N/a		Passed		Signed	Yes Yes
Tasmania	Australia	September 2009	Significant relationship (expansion)	Passed		Passed		Signed	Yes Yes
Australian Capital Territory	Australia	November 2009	Civil partnership (expansion)	—N/a		Passed		Signed	Yes Yes
Newfoundland and Labrador	Canada	December 2009	Marriage (codification)	—N/a		Passed		Signed	Yes Yes
Mexico City	Mexico	December 2009	Marriage	—N/a		39	20	Signed	Yes Yes
Queensland	Australia	February 2010	De facto relationship (expansion)	—N/a		45	36	Signed	Yes Yes
(New South Wales) City of Blue Mountains	Australia	March 2010	Relationship declaration program	—N/a		Passed		Signed	Yes Yes
New South Wales	Australia	May 2010	Registered relationship	32	5	62	9	Signed	Yes Yes
La Rioja	Spain	May 2010	De facto couple	—N/a		Passed		Signed	Yes Yes
Vienna	Austria	June 2010	Registered partnership (expansion)	—N/a		Passed		Signed	Yes Yes
Catalonia	Spain	July 2010	Marriage (codification)	—N/a		Passed		Signed	Yes Yes
New South Wales	Australia	September 2010	Registered relationship (expansion: adoption rights)	22	15	45	43	Signed	Yes Yes
Tasmania	Australia	October 2010	Out-of-state unions as significant relationship	Passed		22	3	Signed	Yes Yes
New South Wales	Australia	November 2010	Registered relationship (expansion: surrogacy)	Passed		Passed		Signed	Yes Yes
(Netherlands) Bonaire, Sint Eustatius and Saba	Netherlands	December 2010	Recognition of unions performed aboard	Passed		Passed		Signed	Yes Yes
Isle of Man	United Kingdom	March 2011	Civil partnership	Passed		Passed		Signed	Yes Yes
South Australia	Australia	June 2011	Domestic partnership agreement (expansion)	14	5	24	15	Signed	Yes Yes
South Australia	Australia	July 2011	Domestic partnership agreement (expansion)	Passed		Passed		Signed	Yes Yes
Nunavut	Canada	October 2011	Marriage (codification and expansion: adoption rights)	—N/a		Passed		Signed	Yes Yes
British Columbia	Canada	November 2011	Marriage (codification)	—N/a		Passed		Signed	Yes Yes
Queensland	Australia	December 2011	Civil partnership	—N/a		47	40	Signed	Yes Yes (Note: Replaced with registered relationship on 27 June 2012.)
Guernsey	United Kingdom	December 2011	Recognition of civil partnership performed in the United Kingdom	—N/a		Passed		Signed	Yes Yes
Jersey	United Kingdom	December 2011	Civil partnership	—N/a		33	0	Signed	Yes Yes
Queensland	Australia	June 2012	Registered relationship	—N/a		69	8	Signed	Yes Yes (Note: Replaced with civil partnership in December 2015.)
Australian Capital Territory	Australia	September 2012	Civil union	—N/a		11	6	Signed	Yes Yes
Tasmania	Australia	September 2012	Marriage	6	8	13	11	—	No No
(Netherlands) Bonaire, Sint Eustatius and Saba	Netherlands	October 2012	Marriage	Passed		Passed		Signed	Yes Yes
Tasmania	Australia	October 2012	Significant relationship (expansion)	Passed		Passed		Signed	Yes Yes
(Western Australia) City of Vincent	Australia	December 2012	Relationship declaration program	—N/a		Passed		Signed	Yes Yes
Macau	China	March 2013	Civil union	—N/a		Failed		—	No No
South Australia	Australia	July 2013	Marriage	—	—	Failed		—	No No
Tasmania	Australia	July 2013	Significant relationship (expansion: adoption rights)	Passed		Passed		Signed	Yes Yes
Colima	Mexico	July 2013	Civil union	—N/a		17	2	—N/a	Yes Yes (Note: Repealed in May 2016.)
Colima	Mexico	August 2013	Civil union	—N/a		Passed		Signed	Yes Yes
Tasmania	Australia	October 2013	Marriage	6	8	—	—	—	No No
Australian Capital Territory	Australia	October 2013	Marriage	—N/a		9	8	Signed	No No (Note: Legislation overturned by the High Court on 12 December 2013.)
Jalisco	Mexico	October 2013	Civil union	—N/a		20	15	Signed	Yes Yes
New South Wales	Australia	November 2013	Marriage	19	21	—	—	—	No No
Campeche	Mexico	December 2013	Civil union	—N/a		Passed		Signed	Yes Yes
Coahuila	Mexico	February 2014	Civil pact of solidarity (expansion: adoption rights)	—N/a		23	2	Signed	Yes Yes
Scotland	United Kingdom	March 2014	Marriage	—N/a		105	18	Signed	Yes Yes
Faroe Islands	Denmark	March 2014	Marriage	—N/a		11	20	—	No No
Gibraltar	United Kingdom	March 2014	Civil partnership	—N/a		16	0	Signed	Yes Yes
Durango	Mexico	April 2014	Marriage	—N/a		Failed		—	No No
Akrotiri and Dhekelia	United Kingdom	April 2014	Marriage	—N/a				Signed	Yes Yes
British Indian Ocean Territory	United Kingdom	April 2014	Marriage	—N/a				Signed	Yes Yes
Alberta	Canada	May 2014	Marriage (codification)	—N/a		Passed		Signed	Yes Yes
Coahuila	Mexico	September 2014	Marriage	—N/a		19	1	Signed	Yes Yes
New South Wales	Australia	November 2014	Out-of-state unions as registered relationship	Passed		Passed		Signed	Yes Yes
Yukon	Canada	December 2014	Marriage (codification)	—N/a		Passed		Signed	Yes Yes
Pitcairn Islands	United Kingdom	May 2015	Marriage	—N/a		Passed		Signed	Yes Yes
(Western Australia) Town of Port Hedland	Australia	August 2015	Relationship declaration program	—N/a		6	2	Signed	Yes Yes
Michoacán	Mexico	September 2015	Domestic partnership	—N/a		34	0	Signed	Yes Yes
Alderney	United Kingdom	November 2015	Recognition of marriage and civil partnership performed abroad	—N/a		10	0	Signed	Yes Yes
Guernsey	United Kingdom	December 2015	Recognition of marriage performed abroad	—N/a		Passed		—N/a (Note: Ordinances and regulations do not require royal assent.)	Yes Yes
(Victoria (state)) Victoria	Australia	December 2015	Registered domestic relationship and domestic relationship (expansion: adoption rights)	31	8	Passed		Signed	Yes Yes
Queensland	Australia	December 2015	Civil partnership	—N/a		64	22	Signed	Yes Yes
Nayarit	Mexico	December 2015	Marriage and concubinage	—N/a		26	1	Signed	Yes Yes
Greenland	Denmark	May 2015	Inatsisartut: Marriage (resolution)	—N/a		27	0	—N/a	Yes Yes
Greenland	Denmark	February 2016	Folketing: Marriage (statutory law)	—N/a		108	0	Signed	Yes Yes
(Victoria (state)) Victoria	Australia	February 2016	Out-of-state union as registered domestic relationship	Passed		Passed		Signed	Yes Yes
Azuay	Ecuador	March 2016	Registered symbolic marriage	—N/a		Passed		Signed	Yes Yes
Campeche	Mexico	May 2016	Marriage	—N/a		34	1	Signed	Yes Yes
Guernsey	United Kingdom	May 2016	Recognition of marriage and civil partnership performed abroad (expansion)	—N/a		Passed		Signed	Yes Yes
Colima	Mexico	June 2016	Marriage	—N/a		24	0	Signed	Yes Yes
Michoacán	Mexico	June 2016	Marriage and concubinage	—N/a		27	0	Signed	Yes Yes
Ascension Island	United Kingdom	June 2016	Marriage	—N/a		5	0	Signed	Yes Yes
South Australia	Australia	July 2016	Domestic partnership agreement (expansion)	Passed		29	12	Signed	Yes Yes
Morelos	Mexico	July 2016	Marriage and concubinage	—N/a		20	6	Signed	Yes Yes
Isle of Man	United Kingdom	July 2016	Marriage	6	3	17	3	Signed	Yes Yes
Aruba	Netherlands	September 2016	Registered partnership	—N/a		11	5	Signed	Yes Yes
British Antarctic Territory	United Kingdom	October 2016	Marriage	—N/a				Signed	Yes Yes
Gibraltar	United Kingdom	November 2016	Marriage	—N/a		15	0	Signed	Yes Yes
Queensland	Australia	November 2016	Civil partnership and de facto relationship (expansion: adoption rights)	—N/a		44	43	Signed	Yes Yes
San Luis Potosí	Mexico	November 2016	Marriage	—N/a		Failed		—	No No
Ontario	Canada	December 2016	Marriage and conjugal relationship (expansion: automatic co-parenthood)	—N/a		79	0	Signed	Yes Yes
(Victoria (state)) Victoria	Australia	December 2016	Marriage (expansion: ending forced divorce for transgender individuals) (Note: Same-sex marriage was not legal in Australia when the bill was debated.)	19	19	45	35	—	No No
South Australia	Australia	December 2016	Registered relationship	Passed		Passed		Signed	Yes Yes
South Australia	Australia	December 2016	Registered relationship and domestic partnership agreement (expansion: adoption rights)	13	4	27	16	Signed	Yes Yes
South Australia	Australia	December 2016	Marriage (expansion: ending forced divorce for transgender individuals) (Note: Same-sex marriage was not legal in Australia when the bill was passed.)	Passed		Passed		Signed	Yes Yes
Tlaxcala	Mexico	January 2017	Domestic partnership	—N/a		18	4	Signed	Yes Yes
Durango	Mexico	January 2017	Marriage	—N/a		4	15	—	No No
Mexico City	Mexico	January 2017	Marriage (constitutional codification)	—N/a		Passed		—N/a	Yes Yes
Northwest Territories	Canada	March 2017	Marriage (codification)	—N/a		Passed		Signed	Yes Yes
South Australia	Australia	March 2017	Registered relationship and domestic partnership agreement (expansion: surrogacy)	Passed		Passed		Signed	Yes Yes
South Australia	Australia	April 2017	Registered relationship (expansion)	Passed		Passed		Signed	Yes Yes
Falkland Islands	United Kingdom	April 2017	Marriage and civil partnership	—N/a		7	1	Signed	Yes Yes
Guernsey	United Kingdom	December 2015	Marriage (agreement in principle)	—N/a		37	7	—N/a	Yes Yes
Guernsey	United Kingdom	December 2016	Marriage (primary legislation)	—N/a		33	5	Signed	Yes Yes
Guernsey	United Kingdom	April 2017	Marriage (secondary legislation)	—N/a		Passed		—N/a	Yes Yes
Faroe Islands	Denmark	April 2016	Løgting: Marriage (resolution)	—N/a		19	14	—N/a	Yes Yes
Faroe Islands	Denmark	May 2017	Folketing: Marriage (statutory law)	—N/a		108	0	Signed	Yes Yes
Tristan da Cunha	United Kingdom	August 2017	Marriage	—N/a		Passed		Signed	Yes Yes
Nova Scotia	Canada	October 2017	Marriage (codification)	—N/a		Passed		Signed	Yes Yes
Saint Helena	United Kingdom	December 2017	Marriage	—N/a		9	2	Signed	Yes Yes
Bermuda	United Kingdom	February 2018	Domestic partnership	8	3	24	10	Signed	Yes Yes
Northern Territory	Australia	April 2018	Marriage and de facto relationship (expansion: adoption rights)	—N/a		Passed		Signed	Yes Yes
Jersey	United Kingdom	September 2015	Marriage (agreement in principle)	—N/a		37	4	—N/a	Yes Yes
Jersey	United Kingdom	May 2018	Marriage (statutory legislation)	—N/a		42	1	Signed	Yes Yes
(Victoria (state)) Victoria	Australia	May 2018	Marriage (expansion: ending forced divorce for transgender individuals)	Passed		Passed		Signed	Yes Yes
Alderney	United Kingdom	December 2017	Marriage (primary legislation)	—N/a		9	0	Signed	Yes Yes
Alderney	United Kingdom	June 2018	Marriage (secondary legislation)	—N/a		Passed		—N/a	Yes Yes
New South Wales	Australia	June 2018	Marriage (codification and expansion)	34	2	Passed		Signed	Yes Yes
Queensland	Australia	June 2018	Marriage (expansion: ending forced divorce for transgender individuals)	—N/a		86	4	Signed	Yes Yes
(Region of Murcia) Murcia	Spain	July 2018	De facto couple	—N/a		Passed		Signed	Yes Yes
Northern Territory	Australia	December 2018	Marriage (codification and expansion)	—N/a		Passed		Signed	Yes Yes
Western Australia	Australia	February 2019	Marriage (expansion: ending forced divorce for transgender individuals)	Passed		Passed		Signed	Yes Yes
Tasmania	Australia	May 2019	Marriage (codification and expansion)	7	6	12	11	Signed	Yes Yes
San Luis Potosí	Mexico	May 2019	Marriage and concubinage	—N/a		14	12	Signed	Yes Yes
(Hidalgo (state)) Hidalgo	Mexico	May 2019	Marriage and concubinage	—N/a		18	2	Signed	Yes Yes
Sinaloa	Mexico	June 2019	Marriage and concubinage	—N/a		18	20	—	No No
Ibaraki Prefecture	Japan	June 2019	Partnership certificate	—N/a		Passed		Signed	Yes Yes
Baja California Sur	Mexico	June 2019	Marriage	—N/a		14	5	Signed	Yes Yes
Zacatecas	Mexico	August 2019	Marriage	—N/a		11	13	—	No No
Oaxaca	Mexico	October 2019	Marriage (codification)	—N/a		25	10	Signed	Yes Yes
Sark	United Kingdom	October 2019	Marriage (agreement in principle)	—N/a		Passed		—N/a	Yes Yes
Sark	United Kingdom	March 2020	Marriage (primary legislation)	—N/a		Passed		Signed	Yes Yes
Sark	United Kingdom	April 2020	Marriage (secondary legislation)	—N/a		Passed		—N/a	Yes Yes
Cayman Islands	United Kingdom	July 2020	Domestic partnership	—N/a		8	9	—	No No
Baja California	Mexico	July 2020	Marriage (Constitutional codification)	—N/a		16	9	—	No No
Curaçao	Netherlands	September 2020	Marriage	—N/a				Withdrawn	No No
Cayman Islands	United Kingdom	September 2020	Civil partnership	—N/a				Signed	Yes Yes
Puebla	Mexico	November 2020	Marriage (codification)	—N/a		31	5	Signed	Yes Yes
Gunma Prefecture	Japan	December 2020	Partnership oath	—N/a		—N/a		Signed	Yes Yes
Tlaxcala	Mexico	December 2020	Marriage	—N/a		16	3	Signed	Yes Yes
Western Australia	Australia	2020	Marriage and de facto relationship (expansion: surrogacy)	--		Passed			No No
Sinaloa	Mexico	June 2021	Marriage	—N/a		23	0	Signed	Yes Yes
Baja California	Mexico	June 2021	Marriage (Constitutional codification)	—N/a		18	4	Ratified by municipalities	Yes Yes
Yucatán	Mexico	August 2021	Marriage (Constitutional codification)	—N/a		20	5	Published	Yes Yes
Saga Prefecture	Japan	August 2021	Partnership certificate	—N/a		Passed		Signed	Yes Yes
Mie Prefecture	Japan	September 2021	Partnership certificate	—N/a		Passed		Signed	Yes Yes
Querétaro	Mexico	September 2021	Marriage, concubinage, adoption	—N/a		20	3	Published	Yes Yes
Sonora	Mexico	September 2021	Marriage	—N/a		25	8	Signed	Yes Yes
Zacatecas	Mexico	December 2021	Marriage	—N/a		18	10	Published	Yes Yes
Aomori Prefecture	Japan	February 2022	Partnership certificate	—N/a		Passed		Signed	Yes Yes
Yucatán	Mexico	March 2022	Marriage	—N/a		25	0	Published	Yes Yes
Akita Prefecture	Japan	April 2022	Partnership certificate	—N/a		Passed		Signed	Yes Yes
Fukuoka Prefecture	Japan	April 2022	Partnership certificate	—N/a		Passed		Signed	Yes Yes
Jalisco	Mexico	April 2022	Marriage (codification)	—N/a		25	8	Published	Yes Yes
Tamaulipas	Mexico	May 2022	Marriage	—N/a		Failed		—	No No
Veracruz	Mexico	June 2022	Marriage (codification)	—N/a		38	4	Published	Yes Yes
Aguascalientes	Mexico	August 2022	Marriage	—N/a		Failed		—	No No
Quintana Roo	Mexico	August 2022	Marriage expansion (adoption)			Passed		Signed	Yes Yes
Tochigi Prefecture	Japan	September 2022	Partnership certificate	—N/a		Passed		Signed	Yes Yes
Durango	Mexico	September 2022	Marriage (codification)	—N/a		15	9	Signed	Yes Yes
Tabasco	Mexico	October 2022	Marriage	—N/a		23	5	Signed	Yes Yes
Tokyo Metropolis	Japan	November 2022	Partnership certificate	—N/a		Passed		Signed	Yes Yes
(State of Mexico) Edomex	Mexico	November 2022	Marriage and concubinage	—N/a		50	16	Signed	Yes Yes
Tamaulipas	Mexico	November 2022	Marriage	—N/a		23	12	Signed	Yes Yes
Guerrero	Mexico	December 2022	Marriage and concubinage	—N/a		38	6	Signed	Yes Yes
Nuevo León	Mexico	June 2023	Marriage (codification) and concubinage	—N/a		23	10	Signed	Yes Yes
Baja California Sur	Mexico	March 2024	Marriage (expansion: adoption)	—N/a		Passed		Vetoed	Pending
Aruba	Netherlands	June 2024	Marriage	—N/a		10	10	Failed	No No
Chiapas	Mexico	December 2024	Marriage	—N/a		30	4	Signed	Yes Yes
Guanajuato	Mexico	May 2025	Marriage	—N/a		18	18	—	No No
Guanajuato	Mexico	June 2025	Marriage	—N/a		17	19	—	No No
Guanajuato	Mexico	December 2025	Marriage	—N/a		25	9	Signed	Yes Yes
(Chihuahua (state)) Chihuahua	Mexico	Unknown	Marriage	—N/a		Pending			
Aguascalientes	Mexico	Unknown	Marriage	—N/a		Pending			
Hong Kong	China	September 2025	Partnership	—N/a		14	71	—	No No

== Prohibition of same-sex unions ==
=== Legislative efforts ===
Various countries have passed (or tried to pass) legislation to prevent same-sex marriage or repeal the existing laws (in some cases including criminalization or fines). Sometimes approving explicit bans or defining marriage as solely the union between a man and a woman, excluding all others.

==== National level ====
Country	Date	Ban on	Upper house		Lower house		Head of state	Final outcome	
Country	Date	Ban on	Yes	No	Yes	No	Head of state	Final outcome	
El Salvador	February 1858	Marriage	Passed		Passed		Signed	Yes Yes	
Suriname	December 1859	Marriage	Passed		Passed		Signed	Yes Yes	
Colombia	May 1873	Marriage	Passed		Passed		Signed	Yes Yes (Note: Struck down in April 2016)	
Costa Rica	January 1888	Marriage	Passed		Passed		Signed	Yes Yes (Note: Struck down in May 2020)	
Jamaica	1897	Marriage	Passed		Passed		Signed	Yes Yes	
Zambia	October 1918	Marriage	Passed by Order in Council in times of colonial North Rodhesia. Not parlametary votation required.				Signed	Yes Yes	
Italy	March 1942	Marriage	Passed by Regio Decreto of King Vittorio Emanuele III, first proposed by Consiglio dei Ministri. Not parlametary votation required.				Signed	Yes Yes	
Eswatini	1952	Adoption	Passed by Order in Council. Not parlament existed at that time.				Signed	Yes Yes	
Cape Verde	January 1968	Marriage and adoption	Passed by portuguese government. Cape Verde was a portuguese colonial dependence at that time.				Signed	Yes Yes	
Fiji	January 1969	Marriage	—N/a		Passed		Signed	Yes Yes	
Liberia	April 1973	Marriage	Passed		Passed		Signed	Yes Yes	
United Kingdom (England and Walles)	July 1973	Marriage	Passed		Passed		Signed	Yes Yes (Note: Repealed in December 2013)	
Indonesia	January 1974	Marriage	—N/a		Passed		Signed	Yes Yes	
Costa Rica	August 1974	Marriage	—N/a		Passed		Signed	Yes Yes (Note: Struck down by Supreme Court in 2018)	
Scotland	May 1977	Marriage	—N/a		Passed		Signed	Yes Yes (Note: Repealed in February 2014)	
Bhutan	1980	Marriage	—N/a		Passed		Signed	Yes Yes	
Venezuela	July 1982	Venezuela	Marriage	Passed		Passed		Signed	Yes Yes
Peru	July 1984	Marriage	Passed by Decreto Legislativo (Ley N.º 23403 May 17, 1982) and then confirmed by Decreto Legislativo N.º 295 of 1984. Congress didn´t vote on it.				Signed	Yes Yes	
Algeria	June 1984	Marriage	Passed		Passed		Signed	Yes Yes	
Ecuador	July 1984	Marriage	Passed		Passed		Signed	Yes Yes (Note: Struck down in July 2019)	
Honduras	August 1984	Marriage	Passed		Passed		Signed	Yes Yes	
Paraguay	January 1985	Marriage and free union	Passed		Passed		Signed	Yes Yes	
Cuba	1987	Marriage	—N/a		Passed		Signed	Yes Yes (Note: Repealed in September 2022)	
Philippines	July 1987	Marriage (explicit recognition of only heterosexual marriage)	—N/a		—N/a		Signed	Yes Yes	
Angola	December 1988	Marriage and de facto union	—N/a		Passed		Signed	Yes Yes	
Cambodia	July 1989	Marriage	—N/a		Passed		Signed	Yes Yes	
Laos	December 1990	Marriage	—N/a		Unanimous vote.		Signed	Yes Yes	
China	1992	Adoption	—N/a		Passed		Signed	Yes Yes	
Panama	May 1994	Marriage	—N/a		Passed		Signed	Yes Yes	
El Salvador	September 1994	Marriage	—N/a		Passed		Signed	Yes Yes	
Costa Rica	August 1995	Cohabitation	—N/a		Passed		Signed	Yes Yes (Note: Repealed in 2022)	
United States	September 1996	Marriage (federal recognition and allows states to refuse to recognize same-sex marriages granted under the laws of other states)	85	14	342	67	Signed	Yes Yes (Note: Repealed in December 2022)	
Philippines	1998	Marriage (explicit limitation of marriage to heterosexual cisgender couples)	Failed		—N/a		—N/a	No	
Venezuela	July 1998	Foreign marriages	Passed		Passed		Signed	Yes Yes	
United States	July 1999	Adoption (federal law, ban only for District of Columbia)	—N/a		213	215		No	
Azerbaijan	December 1999	Marriage	—N/a		Passed		Signed	Yes Yes	
Moldova	October 2000	Marriage	—N/a		Passed		Signed	Yes Yes	
Kenya	July 2001	Adoption (couples and single LGBT person)	Passed		Passed		Signed	Yes Yes	
Botswana	December 2001	Marriage	Passed		Passed		Signed	Yes Yes	
Fiji	2002	Marriage (explicit ban)	—N/a		Passed		Signed	Yes Yes	
Ukraine	January 2003	Marriage	—N/a		Passed		Signed	Yes Yes	
Northern Ireland	October 2003	Marriage	Passed as a Order in Council, not by vote in the Northern Ireland Assembly. It was approved without a recorded vote in the UK Parliament				Signed	Yes Yes (Note: Repealed in July 2019)	
Philippines	July 2004	Marriage (explicit non-recognition of unions performed abroad)	Failed		—N/a		—N/a	No	
Philippines	2004	Marriage (explicit limitation of marriage to heterosexual cisgender couples)	Failed		Failed		—N/a	No	
Australia	August 2004	Marriage	38	6	Passed		Signed	Yes Yes (Note: Repealed in December 2017)	
Madagascar	May 2005	Adoption	—N/a		Passed		Signed	Yes Yes	
New Zealand	May 2005	Marriage	—N/a		47	73		No	
Canada	December 2006	Marriage	—N/a		123	175		No	
China	May 2007	Adoption of Chinese children by LGBT couples and single people in foreign countries	—N/a		—N/a		Signed	Yes Yes	
Madagascar	June 2007	Marriage (explicit ban)	—N/a		Passed		Signed	Yes Yes	
Greece	July 2008	Civil Union	—N/a		Passed		Signed	Yes Yes (Note: Repealed in December 2015.)	
(The Bahamas) Bahamas	2008	Marriage	—N/a		Passed		Signed	Yes Yes	
Ethiopia	July 2009	Marriage	—N/a		Passed		Signed	Yes Yes	
Philippines	December 2009	Marriage (criminalization)	—N/a		Failed		—N/a	No	
(Timor-Leste) East Timor	September 2011	Marriage	—N/a		27	1	Signed	Yes Yes	
Lesotho	2011	Adoption	—N/a		Passed		Signed	Yes Yes	
Mali	December 2011	Marriage and adoption	—N/a		121	0	Signed	Yes Yes	
Russia	September 2012	Marriage	Passed		Passed		Signed	Yes Yes	
Russia	June 2013	Adoption of Russian children by LGBT couples and single people in foreign countries that recognise same-sex unions	131	0	443	0	Signed	Yes Yes	
Uganda	December 2013	All types of same-sex unions and adoption (criminalization)	—N/a		Passed		Signed	No (Note: Struck down by Supreme Court in 2014 on technical grounds)	
Nigeria	January 2014	All types of same-sex unions and adoption(criminalization)	109	0	Passed		Signed	Yes Yes	
Vietnam	June 2014	Ban legal marriage and cohabitation but also allows symbolic same-sex marriages (previously criminalized)	—N/a		237	160	Signed	Yes Yes	
Malawi	April 2015	Marriage (criminalization)	—N/a		193	0	Signed	Yes Yes	
Nicaragua	April 2015	Marriage, free unions and adoption	—N/a		64	0	Signed	Yes Yes	
Panama	October 2015	Marriage (recognition of foreign unions)	—N/a		Passed		Signed	Yes Yes	
Benin	November 2015	Adoption (at national level restricted only for heterosexual couples and explicit ban on foreign same sex couples)	—N/a		Passed		Signed	Yes Yes	
Nauru	2017	Marriage	—N/a		Passed		Signed	Yes Yes	
Haiti	August 2017	Marriage (criminalization)	14	1	Failed			No	
Estonia	August 2017	Civil Union	—N/a		19	47		No	
Bolivia	June 2018	Marriage and free union	—N/a		Passed		Signed	Yes Yes	
Honduras	August 2018	Adoption	—N/a		Passed		Signed	Yes Yes	
Nepal	August 2018	Marriage	—N/a		Passed		Signed	Yes Yes (Note: Struck down in June 2026)	
Zimbabwe	May 2019	Marriage	—N/a		Passed		Signed	Yes Yes	
Ivory Coast	June 2019	Marriage	—N/a		213	10	Signed	Yes Yes	
Armenia	November 2019	Marriage and adoption (explicit ban)	—N/a		Failed			No	
Mozambique	December 2019	Marriage and domestic unions	—N/a		Passed unanimously and by acclamation		Signed	Yes Yes	
Equatorial Guinea	2021	Adopcion by same sex couples (by individuals is unclear)	—N/a		Passed		Signed	Yes Yes	
China	January 2021	Marriage	—N/a		2879	2	Signed	Yes Yes	
Panama	March 2021	Adoption	—N/a		Passed		Signed	Yes Yes	
Guatemala	March 2022	Marriage (criminalization)	—N/a		152	8		No (Note: Passed by Congress, archived after threat of presidential veto.)	
Zimbabwe	September 2022	Civil Partnership	—N/a		Passed		Signed	Yes Yes	
Latvia	April 2023	Adoption	—N/a		Passed		Signed	Yes Yes	
Uganda	June 2023	All types of same-sex unions and adoption (criminalization)	—N/a		384	1	Signed	Yes Yes	
Hungary	July 2023	Adoption (report same-sex couples which raise children to the state authorities)	—N/a		Passed		Vetoed	No	
Russia	July 2023	Marriage, adoption and foster care for trans people.	Unanimous vote		Unanimous vote		Signed	Yes Yes	
Kazakhstan	2024	Adoption	—N/a		Passed		Signed	Yes Yes	
Ghana	February 2024	Same sex unions (criminalization)	—N/a		Passed through an unopposed voice vote		Not signed	No	
Belarus	July 2024	Marriage	—N/a		Passed		Signed	Yes Yes	
(Georgia (country)) Georgia	September 2024	Marriage and adoption	—N/a		84	0	Signed	Yes Yes	
Namibia	October 2024	Marriage and recognition of foreign unions (not criminalization)	Passed		Passed		Signed	Yes Yes	
Vanuatu	November 2024	Marriage, regardless of religious, civil or traditional type marriages	—N/a		Passed		Signed	Yes Yes	
Iraq	February 2025	Marriage	Passed		Passed		Signed	Yes Yes	
Namibia	March 2025	Marriage and recognition of foreign unions (criminalization and fines)	Unanimous vote		Unanimous vote		Vetoed	No	
Tonga	August 2025	Marriage (explicit ban)	—N/a		17	0	Signed	Yes Yes	
Burkina Faso	September 2025	Marriage, adoption and same sex intimacy (sodomy criminalization)	—N/a		71	0	Signed	Yes Yes	
Niger	June 2026	Marriage and same sex intimacy (criminalization)	—N/a		Passed		Signed	Yes Yes	
Ecuador	August 2026	Adoption (restricted only for heterosexual couples and heterosexual singles)	—N/a		118	0	Signed	Yes Yes	
Ukraine	2026	Same sex unions	Pending		Pending				
Ghana	2026	Same sex unions (criminalization)	—N/a		Passed through an unopposed voice vote		Pending		

=== Sub-national level ===
In countries with a federal system of governance, states and territories often may forbid recognition to same-sex couples in their own jurisdictions.

State/Territory	Country	Date	Same-sex union	Upper House		Lower house		Head of State	Law enacted?
State/Territory	Country	Date	Same-sex union	Yes	No	Yes	No	Head of State	Law enacted?
Goa	India	1867/1961	Marriage	—N/a		It comes from the Portuguese Civil Code of 1867, which was extended to the overseas provinces by decree		Signed	Yes Yes
Dadra and Nagar Haveli and Daman and Diu	India	1869	Marriage	—N/a		Adopted by decree in 1869 Extended from the Portuguese Civil Code of 1867, which was extended to the overseas provinces		Signed	Yes Yes
Andaman and Nicobar Islands	India	July 1958	Marriage	—N/a		n/a		Passed by Chief Commissioner	Yes Yes
(Chuuk State) Chuuk	Federated States of Micronesia	1966	Marriage	Passed		Passed		Signed	Yes Yes
(Jammu and Kashmir (union territory)) Jammu and Kashmir	India	May 1981	Marriage	—N/a		Passed		Signed	Yes Yes
Assam	India	April 1989	Marriage	—N/a		Passed		Signed	Yes Yes
(Pohnpei State) Pohnpei	Federated States of Micronesia	April 1989	Statutory civil marriage, statutory religious marriage	—N/a		Passed		Signed	Yes Yes
Himachal Pradesh	India	September 1997	Marriage	—N/a		Passed		Signed	Yes Yes
Kosrae	Federated States of Micronesia	2000	Marriage	—N/a		Passed		Signed	Yes Yes
Andhra Pradesh	India	May 2002	Marriage	Passed		Passed		Signed	Yes Yes
Gujarat	India	March 2006	Marriage	—N/a		Passed		Signed	Yes Yes
Bihar	India	August 2006	Marriage	—N/a		Passed		Signed	Yes Yes
Chhattisgarh	India	November 2006	Marriage	—N/a		Passed		Signed	Yes Yes
Cook Islands	New Zealand	April 2007	Marriage (explicit ban)	—N/a		Passed		Signed	Yes Yes
Niue	New Zealand	2007	Marriage	—N/a		Passed		Signed	Yes Yes
Tokelau	New Zealand	September 2007	Marriage	—N/a		Passed		Signed	Yes Yes
Haryana	India	April 2008	Marriage	—N/a		Passed		Signed	Yes Yes
Arunachal Pradesh	India	January 2009	Marriage	—N/a		Passed		Signed	Yes Yes
Zanzibar	Tanzania	2011	Adoption	—N/a		Passed		Signed	Yes Yes
(Punjab, Pakistan) Punjab	India	January 2013	Marriage	—N/a		Passed		Signed	Yes Yes
Republika Srpska	Bosnia and Herzegovina	February 2023	Marriage	—N/a		Passed		Signed	Yes Yes
Uttarakhand	India	2024	Marriage and live-in relationships	—N/a		Passed		Signed	Yes Yes
Gujarat	India	2026	Marriage and live-in relationships	—N/a		Passed		Signed	Yes Yes
Assam	India	2026	Marriage and live-in relationships	—N/a		Passed		Signed	Yes Yes
(Nigeria) Cross River	Nigeria	July 2026	Same sex unions (criminalization)	—N/a		Unanimous vote		Signed	Yes Yes
(Nigeria) Kano	Nigeria	Unknown	Marriage (criminalization)	—N/a		pending			

Note: In India all States must record all marriages under federal laws but no federal law allows or recognizes same-sex unions of any kind. In addition, States may pass their own laws on same-sex unions if they wish.

=== Constitutional efforts ===
Thirty-two countries have passed constitutional amendments banning a variety of same-sex unions. These amendments have taken several forms. Some are limited to banning only marriage. Others ban marriage and prohibit legislation providing "similar rights".

==== National level ====
Cuba was the first country to prohibit same-sex marriage in February 1976. Paraguay, Honduras and Bolivia are the only cases that not only marriage is prohibited but also de facto unions. Vietnam, Cuba, and Ecuador repealed their same-sex marriage bans in November 2013, April 2019, and June 2019, respectively.

As of 18 November 2026, thirty-three countries prohibit same-sex marriage on a national level. Those are Armenia, Belarus, Bolivia, Bulgaria, Burkina Faso, Burundi, Cambodia, the Central African Republic, Croatia, the Democratic Republic of the Congo, Dominican Republic, Gabon, Georgia, Honduras, Hungary, Jamaica, Kenya, Kyrgyzstan, Latvia, Lithuania, Mali, Moldova, Mongolia, Montenegro, Palau, Paraguay, Poland, Russia, Rwanda, Serbia, Slovakia, South Sudan, Tuvalu, Uganda, Ukraine, Venezuela and Zimbabwe.

Country	Date	Ban on	Upper house		Lower house		Head of state	Final outcome
Country	Date	Ban on	Yes	No	Yes	No	Head of state	Final outcome
Cuba	February 1976	Marriage	General referendum (97.7%)					Yes Yes (Note: Repealed in April 2019)
Burkina Faso	June 1991	Marriage	General referendum (92.83%)					Yes Yes
Bulgaria	July 1991	Marriage	Passed		Passed		Signed	Yes Yes
Vietnam	April 1992	Marriage	—N/a		Passed		Signed	Yes Yes (Note: Repealed on 1 January 2014, as the 1992 Constitution was replaced by the new one, which does not contain a definition of marriage.)
Paraguay	June 1992	Marriage and de facto union	Passed		Passed		Signed	Yes Yes
Lithuania	October 1992	Marriage	General referendum (78.24)					Yes Yes
Cambodia	September 1993	Marriage	Passed		Passed		Signed	Yes Yes
Belarus	March 1994	Marriage	Passed		Passed		Signed	Yes Yes
Moldova	July 1994	Marriage	—N/a		Passed		Signed	Yes Yes
Ukraine	June 1996	Marriage	—N/a		Passed		Signed	Yes Yes
Poland	May 1997	Marriage	General referendum (52.71%)				Signed	Yes Yes
Venezuela	December 1999	Marriage and de facto union	General referendum (71.78%)					Yes Yes
Rwanda	May 2003	Marriage	General referendum (93.42%)					Yes Yes
United States	July 2004	Marriage	48	50	227	186	—	No No
Burundi	February 2005	Marriage	General referendum (92.02%)					Yes Yes
Honduras	March 2005	Marriage and de facto union	—N/a		128	0	Signed	Yes Yes
Uganda	September 2005	Marriage	—N/a		111	17	Signed	Yes Yes
Latvia	December 2005	Marriage	—N/a		65	5	Signed	Yes Yes
(Democratic Republic of the Congo) DR Congo	December 2005	Marriage	General referendum (84.31%)					Yes Yes
United States	July 2006	Marriage	49	48	236	187	—	No No (Note: Failed to meet the required threshold.)
Serbia	October 2006	Marriage	General referendum (53.04%)					Yes Yes
Montenegro	October 2007	Marriage	—N/a		Passed		Signed	Yes Yes
Ecuador	September 2008	Marriage	General referendum (69.46%)					Yes Yes (Note: Struck down by the Constitutional Court on 12 June 2019)
Palau	November 2008	Marriage	Specific referendum (83.56%)					Yes Yes
Bolivia	January 2009	Marriage and free union	General referendum (61.43%)					Yes Yes
El Salvador	October 2009	Marriage	—N/a		46	38	—	No
Saint Vincent and the Grenadines	November 2009	Marriage	General referendum (43.71%)					No No
Angola	2010	Marriage and de facto union	Passed		Passed		Signed	Yes Yes
Dominican Republic	January 2010	Marriage	Passed		Passed		Signed	Yes Yes
Kenya	August 2010	Marriage	General referendum (68.55%)					Yes Yes
Zambia	March 2011	Marriage	—N/a		Failed		—	No No
Jamaica	April 2011	Marriage and any other similar relationship	Passed		Passed		Signed	Yes Yes
Hungary	April 2011	Marriage	—N/a		262	44	Signed	Yes Yes
South Sudan	July 2011	Marriage	Passed		Passed		Signed	Yes Yes
Liberia	June 2012	Marriage	Passed		Failed		—	No No
Zimbabwe	March 2013	Marriage	General referendum (94.49%)					Yes Yes
North Macedonia	September 2013	Marriage	—N/a		Failed		—	No No
Croatia	December 2013	Marriage	Specific referendum (65.87%)					Yes Yes
El Salvador	February 2014	Marriage	—N/a		Failed		—	No
Slovakia	June 2014	Marriage	—N/a		102	18	—N/a	Yes Yes
North Macedonia	January 2015	Marriage	—N/a		Failed		—	No
Slovakia	February 2015	Marriage	Specific referendum (94.50%)					No (Note: Although the amendment received 94.5% of the vote, turnout was only at 21.4%. For referendums in Slovakia to be valid, turnout has to surpass 50% of registered voters.)
Armenia	December 2015	Marriage	General referendum (63.37%)					Yes Yes
Switzerland	February 2016	Marriage	Specific referendum (49.16%)					No (Note: declared invalid by the Federal Supreme Court in 2019)
Central African Republic	March 2016	Marriage	General referendum (93.00%)				Signed	Yes Yes
Kyrgyzstan	December 2016	Marriage	General referendum (79.59%)					Yes Yes
Colombia	2017	Same-sex adoption (overturn Supreme Court ruling)	55	25	12	20	Not Placed on Ballot	No
(Georgia (country)) Georgia	October 2017	Marriage	—N/a		117	2	Vetoed	Yes Yes
Czech Republic	June 2018	Marriage	—N/a		Failed			No
Romania	October 2018	Marriage	107	13	232	22	—N/a	No (Note: Although the amendment received majority of the vote, turnout was only at 20.41%. For referendums in Romania to be valid, turnout has to surpass 30% of registered voters.)
Romania	October 2018	Marriage	Specific referendum (93.40%)					No
Panama	October 2019	Marriage	—N/a		Withdrawn			No
Russia	July 2020	Marriage	Passed		Passed		Signed	Yes Yes
Russia	July 2020	Marriage	General referendum (77.92%)					Yes Yes
Estonia	January 2021	Marriage	—N/a		29	49	—	No
Hungary	December 2020	Adoption	—N/a		134	45	—N/a	Yes Yes
Honduras	January 2021	Marriage and de facto union (special majorities of the Assembly (3/4) to modify prohibition)	—N/a		88	28	Signed	Yes Yes
Belarus	February 2022	Marriage (explicit ban)	General referendum (65.2%)					Yes Yes
Mali	June 2023	Marriage (explicit ban)	General referendum (97%)					Yes Yes
Tuvalu	November 2023	Marriage	—N/a		Unanimous vote		Signed	Yes Yes
Gabon	November 2024	Marriage (perpetual ban) (Note: According to article 169, the constitutional definition of marriage as a heterosexual union cannot be modified in any way.)	General referendum (91.6%)					Yes Yes
Slovakia	September 2025	Adoption	—N/a		90	7	—N/a	Yes Yes
(Kazakhstan) Kazakshtan	July 2026	Marriage	General referendum (89.9%)					Yes Yes
Senegal	July 2026	Marriage	—N/a		129	0	—N/a	No
Lithuania	2026	Marriage and civil unions (explicit ban)	—N/a		Pending			

==== Sub-national level ====
The first jurisdiction to explicitly ban same-sex marriage in its Constitution was the U.S. state of Alaska in November 1998, however, same-sex marriage was legalised in the state in October 2014. The first jurisdiction to enact such a ban was Yucatán, in July 2009, but since August 2010 the state recognizes same-sex marriages performed in Mexico and in August 2021 local congress removed the heterosexual definition of marriage from the state's constitution.

State/Territory	Country	Date	Ban on	Upper House		Lower house		Head of state	Final outcome
State/Territory	Country	Date	Ban on	Yes	No	Yes	No	Head of state	Final outcome
Morelos	Mexico	November 1930	Marriage	—N/a		Passed		—N/a	Yes Yes (Note: Repealed in June 2016)
Kosrae	Federated States of Micronesia	January 2005	Marriage	—N/a		Failed		—N/a	No No
Yucatán	Mexico	July 2009	Marriage	—N/a		Passed		—N/a	Yes Yes (Note: Repealed in September 2021)
Baja California	Mexico	May 2011	Marriage	—N/a		Passed		Signed	Yes Yes (Note: Unenforced since November 2017; repealed in July 2021)
Colima	Mexico	July 2013	Marriage	—N/a		17	2	—N/a	Yes Yes (Note: Repealed in May 2016.)
(Canton of Zurich) Zurich	Switzerland	November 2016	Marriage	—N/a		52	110	—N/a	No No
(Canton of Zurich) Zurich	Switzerland	November 2016	Marriage	Specific referendum (19.09%)					No No
Veracruz	Mexico	July 2018	Marriage	—N/a		32	10	—N/a	No No
British Virgin Islands	United Kingdom	2026	Marriage	—N/a		Pending			

==== National level (Non Constitution) ====
Some countries have explicit bans on same sex marriage but it is not in the constitution but rather laid out in other laws.

Country	Date	Info			
Country	Date	Info	Azerbaijan	Unknown	Article 2.3 of the Family Code reads: "Marriage is a voluntary union of a man and a woman registered in the relevant executive authority for the purpose family."
Bahamas	Unknown	The Bahamas Marriage Act defines marriage as only being possible between a man and a woman.			
Bahrain	Unknown	Under Islamic law, same sex marriage is illegal.			
Bangladesh	Unknown	Islamic law prohibits same sex marriage.			
Brunei	Unknown	Same-sex marriage is prohibited by Sharia law, which is enforced in Brunei.			
Egypt	Unknown	Egypt has never accepted same-sex marriage, and anyone caught trying to perform a ceremony could be arrested.			
Guinea-Bissau	Unknown	The Civil Code's Article 1577 states that "Marriage is the contract concluded between two people of different sexes who intend to legitimately form a family through a full communion of life."			
Iraq	Unknown	Article 3.1 of the Personal Status Law defines that "Marriage is a contract between a man and a woman who is lawfully permissible to him, the purpose of which is to establish a bond for a mutual life and procreate children."			
Jordan	Unknown	Article 5 of the Personal Status Law states that marriage is a contract between a man and a woman who are legally permitted to form a family.			
Lebanon	Unknown	In Lebanon, only religious marriages are permitted. 15 separate family laws are in force in Lebanon and are administered by separate religious courts. The country does not recognize same-sex marriage or any other form of legal partnership for same-sex couples.			
Malaysia	Unknown	Islamic law prohibits same sex marriage.			
Maldives	Unknown	Section 410 (a) (8) of Maldives penal code states: “A person commits an offense if two persons of the same sex enter into a marriage.”			
Myanmar	Unknown	Myanmar does not recognize same-sex marriages or civil unions under its national laws. The country’s legal framework, influenced by colonial-era legislation and religious family laws, does not provide provisions for such unions. Specifically, the Special Marriage Act of 1872, which governs interfaith marriages, assumes heterosexual partnerships and does not explicitly permit same-sex marriages. Additionally, religious family laws applicable to Buddhists, Christians, Muslims, and Hindus in Myanmar do not recognize same-sex unions On March 2, 2014, Myo Min Htet and Tin Ko Ko held what is considered Myanmar’s first public same-sex wedding ceremony. Dressed in traditional Burmese attire, they celebrated their union in front of approximately 200 guests at a hotel in Yangon. Despite the ceremony’s cultural significance, it held no legal standing under Myanmar law.			
Nicaragua	Unknown	Article 72 of the constitution states that marriage is between a man and a woman.			
Oman	Unknown	Same-sex marriage is prohibited by Sharia law, which is enforced in Oman.			
Saint Vincent and the Grenadines	Unknown	Same sex marriage is banned in Saint Vincent and the Grenadines.			
Saudi Arabia	Unknown	Sharia law defines marriage as between a man and a woman, therefore banning same-sex marriage.			
Sierra Leone	Unknown				
Turkmenistan	Unknown	The Family Code of Turkmenistan defines marriage as a voluntary equal union of a man and a woman.			
United Arab Emirates	Unknown	Because each has different needs, marriage in the United Arab Emirates is defined as a union between a man and a woman.			
Uzbekistan	Unknown	Chapter 14 of the Uzbek constitution declares marriage to be based on "traditional family values".			
Vatican City	Unknown	Same-sex marriage is forbidden in Vatican City due to canon law.			
Qatar	1915	In Qatar, same-sex marriage is not permitted by law. The strict Muslim nation of Qatar forbids same-sex marriage and all other same-sex relationships. LGBTQ+ people face significant discrimination in the nation's laws and cultural standards, and homosexuality carries a jail sentence or fine. Because of this, LGBTQ+ people in Qatar are not granted the same rights and protections as heterosexual couples, and homosexual marriage is neither permitted nor permitted.			
Syria	1949	Same sex marriage has been banned in the country since 1949.			
Libya	1953				
Ghana	1960				
Guatemala	1963	Article 78 of the Civil Code of Guatemala (1963) defines marriage as a social institution where a man and a woman are legally united.			
Algeria	1966				
Lesotho	1966	The common law definition of marriage is “a union of one man with one woman, to the exclusion, while it lasts, of all others”			
Cameroon	1967				
Cape Verde	1968	Marriage, according to Article 1551 of the Civil Code, is the "voluntary union between two people of different sexes, in accordance with the law, who intend to form a family through a full communion of life." According to the Civil Code's Article 1587, "A marriage contracted by two people of the same sex is legally non-existent."			
Afghanistan	1971	Article 25 in Afghanistans Law on Marriage (1971) states: “The marriage certificate is a document of man and woman which proves the contract of marriage.”			
Liberia	1973	Sub. §2.1. of Title 9 of the Domestic Relations Law defines marriage as “a civil contract between a male and female”.			
Indonesia	1974	There is no legal recognition of same-sex unions in Indonesia. Article 1 of the Law No. 1 of the Year 1974 on Marriage states unequivocally that marriage is "a physical and spiritual bond between a man and a woman as husband and wife, having the purpose of establishing a happy and lasting family founded on the Belief in God Almighty".[1] Moreover, Article 2 states that a marriage is only lawful if it is in accordance with the laws of the religions of the respective parties. Meanwhile, Indonesians who have entered into same-sex marriage abroad are not allowed to register their marriage in Indonesia due to Article 1 of the Marriage Act.[2] Additionally, Article 34(1) of the Law No. 23 of the Year 2006 on Civil Administration obliges all marriages to be reported to the local authorities within 60 days after marriage, and the explanation of Article 34(1) states that "marriage" can only be performed by a man and a woman.			
Somalia	1975	According to the 1975 Marriage Law, a marriage is a contract with equal rights and responsibilities between a man and a woman with the goal of starting a family.			
Solomon Islands	1978	Banned since 1978.			
Barbados	1979	In Barbados, same-sex marriage is essentially prohibited by the 1979 Marriage Act, which defines a marriage as one between a man and a woman.			
Iran	1979	Definition of marriage used follows from the Islamic definition of a union between a man and women. The marriage is prohibited and same-sex sexual activity is punished as stated in the Penal code.			
Bhutan	1980				
Togo	1980				
Mauritania	1983				
Kuwait	1984	Article 1 of the Kuwaiti Personal Status Law (1984) defines marriage as a contract between a man and a woman who is legally available to him, for the purpose of cohabitation, matrimony and strengthening the power of the nation.			
Republic of the Congo	1984	The Republic of Congo Family Code (Law No. 073-84): Section II. Marriage. Article 127. - Definition. "Marriage is the public act by which a man and a woman establish between them a legal and lasting union, the conditions of formation, effects and dissolution of which are determined by this Code."			
Philippines	1987	Marriage (explicit recognition of only heterosexual marriage)			
Guinea	1988				
Marshall Islands	1988	The Marshall Islands government Act, which was published in 1988, set down guidelines for marriage, birth, and death registration. Marriage-related terms only applied to couples of different sexes (i.e., one man and one woman).			
Senegal	1989	According to Article 101 of the Senegalese Family Code, "An engagement is a solemn agreement by which a man and a woman promise marriage to each other." This makes marriage between a man and a woman clear.			
Laos	1990	The Family Law defines marriage to be a union between a man and a woman. Laos has not introduced any specific legislation around marriage equality for same-sex couples.			
North Korea	1990	Marriage in North Korea is defined as between a man and a woman. Article 8 of the Family Law of the Democratic People’s Republic of Korea states “Marriage may be done only between one man and one woman.”			
Sudan	1991				
North Macedonia	1992	Family Law from 1992, section 6: "Marriage is a legally regulated union of life between a man and a woman in which the interests of the spouses, the family and society are realized."			
Peru	1993	Article 234 of the Civil Code establishes that marriage is the union between a man and a woman. The Civil Code establishes that "homosexuality" is grounds for divorce, separation and annulment of marriage. The Constitution (1993) establishes that cohabitation is the stable union of a man and a woman (Article 5).			
Yemen	1993	Same sex marriage has been banned since 1993.			
Panama	1994	Article 57 of the 1972 constitution states that marriage is the legal basis of the family, and rests on the equality of rights of spouses (no mention of gender.) Article 58 of the 1972 constitution provides for the right to register as civil marriage the de facto union of persons of different sex after cohabitating for at least five consecutive years in conditions of single partnership and stability. Article 34 of the Family Code (1994) establishes that people of the same sex cannot marry each other. In 2018, the Inter-American Court of Human Rights ruled that the American convention on Human rights mandates the recognition of same-sex marriage, recommending that countries issue decrees until legislation was brought into place. In March 2023, after seven years of delay the court ruled that there is no positive right to same-sex marriage in Panama under the constitution, halting any potential change for the time being through the courts.			
Fiji	2001	The Fijian Marriage Act of 1968 was adjusted in 2002 to explicitly state that "marriage in this registry (or place) which is in law the voluntary union of one man and one woman to the exclusion of all others." Additionally, previous Fijian Prime Ministers have been opposed to same-sex marriage.			
Turkey	2001	The Civil Code of Turkey does not recognize same sex marriage.			
Benin	2002	"Marriage may only be contracted between a man of at least eighteen years of age and a woman of at least eighteen years of age," according to Article 123 of the Persons and Family Code (2002).			
Albania	2003	Article 7 of the 2003 Family Law states that "Marriage can be concluded between a man and a woman who are 18 years or older." In accordance with Article 163, "Cohabitation is a factual union between a man and a woman."			
Comoros	2005	Article 13 of the Family Code (2005) defines marriage as a legal union contract between a man and a woman. Article 77 establishes that a woman may request a divorce if her husband is homosexual.			
Gambia	2005				
Madagascar	2007	Law No. 2007-022 on Marriage and Matrimonial Regimes, Article 2, declares: "Marriage between two persons of the same sex is prohibited, whether celebrated before the Civil Registrar or performed according to traditional ceremonies." "Gender identity" is mentioned in Article 39 as a reason why marriage is completely null and void.			
Zambia	2007	Zambia's Matrimonial Causes Act, which specifically ruled same-sex marriages null and void, went into effect in 2007. Zambia added a new provision to its constitution in 2010 that specifically prohibits same-sex marriage. The term "domestic relationship" is defined by the Anti-Gender-Based Violence Act (2011) as "a relationship, between a victim and a respondent in any of the following ways: (b) the victim cohabits with the respondent in a relationship in the nature of a marriage notwithstanding that they are not married, were not married to each other, or could not or cannot be married to each other." Those in same-sex relationships are included in this definition.			
Tajikistan	2008	Same-sex marriage is banned in Tajikistan.			
Ethiopia	2009	Ethiopia's federal law places a statutory ban on same-sex marriage.			
Romania	2009	Romania's so-called Civil Code (Law no. 287/2009) forbids same-sex marriage by law.			
Kazakhstan	2010	The Marriage and Family Code defines marriage as a union with equal rights between a man and a woman. It also states "The factual cohabitation of a man and a woman, as well as persons of the same sex shall not be recognized as the marriage (matrimony)." Article 11(1) states marriage shall not be allowed between persons of the same sex.			
East Timor	2011	The Civil Code (Law No. 10/2011), states the following: Article 1467 (Notion of marriage): Marriage is the contract concluded between two people of different sex who want to start a family through a full communion of life, in accordance with the provisions of this Code. Article 1517 (Non-existent marriages): 1. It is legally non-existent: e) Marriage contracted by two people of the same sex.			
Chad	2013	Marriage is defined as the union of a man and a woman in Article 28 of Law 13-008 2013-05-10 PR on the Organization of Civil Status in the Republic of Chad.			
Nigeria	2014				
Eritrea	2015	Eritrea effectively bans same-sex marriage. The country does not recognize same-sex unions in any legal form, and there are no provisions for civil partnerships or domestic partnerships for same-sex couples. Furthermore, Eritrea criminalizes same-sex sexual activity under Article 310 of its 2015 Penal Code, which applies to both men and women. This law carries a penalty of five to seven years’ imprisonment. The legal framework, coupled with the absence of anti-discrimination protections, creates a hostile environment for LGBTQ+ individuals.			
Malawi	2015	Malawi's Marriage, Divorce, and Family Relations Law went into force in April 2015. Among other reasons, the law forbids gay marriages from being acknowledged at all. Additionally, it defines cohabitation and marriage as involving a man and a woman. By defining gender as the sex allocated at birth, the legislation also makes heterosexual partnerships between transgender and cisgender individuals of the opposite gender illegal.			
Vietnam	2015	Law on Marriage and Family (2015) states that marriage and cohabitation are between a man and a woman. Article 8(2) states "The State shall not recognize marriage between persons of the same sex."			
El Salvador	2018	Article 90 of the Family Code establishes that it is a cause for absolute nullity of marriage when the parties are of the same sex.			
Nauru	2018	There is no legal recognition of same-sex couples in Nauru. Section 49 of The Births Deaths and Marriages Registration Act (2017) states that "Marriage in the Republic shall be the voluntary union of one man and one woman." Section 70 states that "A marriage solemnized in a foreign country shall not be recognized as a marriage in the Republic if the marriage is (a) between a male and another male; (b) between a female and another female."			
Singapore	2018	Singaporean Prime Minister Lee Hsien Loong reaffirmed that marriage will continue to be "between a man and a woman" at the same time he declared that Section 377a of the criminal code would be abolished. On November 29 of the same year, Singapore further restricted homosexual marriage.			
Angola	2019	Marriage is defined as the voluntary union of a man and a woman in Article 20 of the Family Code.			
Ivory Coast	2019	Same-sex marriage is essentially prohibited in Côte d'Ivoire by the 2019 Law on Marriage, which defines a marriage as a partnership between a man and a woman.			
Mozambique	2019	Marriage and domestic unions have been banned since 2019.			
China	2021	The Civil Code, which came into effect on January 1, 2021, defines marriage as a union between a man and a woman, thereby excluding same-sex couples from legal marriage recognition.			
Vanuatu	2024	In 2024, the Vanuatu parliament passed an amendment to the Marriage Act, defining a marriage as being between a man and a woman, banning same-sex marriage.			

== See also ==
- LGBT rights by country or territory
- Same-sex union court cases
