= LGBTQ rights in Gabon =

- Gabon
- Legal status: Legal 1960-2019, again since 2020, unequal age of consent
- Gender identity: No
- Military: No
- Discrimination protections: Limited protection based on sexual orientation

Family rights
- Recognition of relationships: No
- Adoption: No

Lesbian, gay, bisexual, transgender, and queer (LGBTQ) people in Gabon face legal challenges not experienced by non-LGBTQ residents. Except for a period between July 2019 and June 2020, same-sex sexual activity has generally been legal in Gabon.

Same-sex couples and households headed by same-sex couples are not eligible for the same legal protections available to opposite-sex couples and LGBTQ persons face stigmatization among the broader population.

In December 2008, Gabon co-sponsored and signed the non-binding UN declaration on sexual orientation and gender identity which called for the global decriminalization of homosexuality. It was one of only six African countries to do so. In 2011, however, Gabon voted against a joint statement on ending acts of violence and related human rights violations based on sexual orientation and gender identity at the United Nations, which condemned violence and discrimination against LGBTQ people.

== Laws regarding same-sex sexual activity ==
Historically, Gabon has not criminalized same-sex relationships or acts between adults. This was true both prior to independence from France and after independence, with the exception of a period from 2019 to 2020. The age of consent was not equal. Opposite-sex sexual acts required a minimum age of 15, while same-sex sexual acts required the minimum age of 21.

On 5 July 2019, Gabon enacted revisions to its Penal Code which criminalised homosexual relations between consenting adults with a potential penalty of imprisonment up to 6 months and/or a fine of up to 5 million CFA francs. According to Davis Mac-Iyalla of the Interfaith Diversity Network of West Africa, he claimed he knew of two men in Gabon who had already been arrested under the law and had to bribe the police to be let go.

On 23 June 2020, the National Assembly approved the government's bill to decriminalise same-sex sexual activity. It was approved by the Senate on 29 June, and signed by President Ali Bongo on 7 July 2020. The age of sexual majority was set at 15 for girls and 18 for boys, regardless of partner.

Despite the non-criminal status of same-sex relationships and acts, it has been reported that police occasionally use "breaches of modesty" charges to target same-sex couples and people with non-gender-conforming presentations. Despite this, such discriminatory misuses of neutral laws do not seem to be widespread. State-sponsored harassment of LGBTQ+ people is not present, but harassment by individuals is common.

== Recognition of same-sex relationships ==
There is no legal recognition of same-sex couples. In November 2024, Gabon adopted a new constitution via a national referendum, which included a provision explicitly defining marriage as a union between a man and a woman. This definition was enshrined as an "eternity clause," making it unamendable under the current constitutional framework. The clause states: "Le mariage, union entre deux personnes de sexe opposé" (Marriage, a union between two people of the opposite sex). The constitutional ban on same-sex marriage took effect on 12 April 2025.

== Discrimination protections ==
There are limited protections based on sexual orientation and sexual life. There is no legal protection against discrimination based on gender identity. Unemployment among openly LGBTQ+ is nearly 100%, and no openly LGBTQ+ people serve in the Gabonese government.

Law No. 025/2023 of 09/07/2023 amending Law No. 001/2011 of 25 September 2011 on the Protection of Personal Data included sexual orientation and sexual life as sensitive data.

== Living conditions ==
The U.S. Department of State's 2010 Human Rights Report found that "discrimination and violence against lesbian, gay, bisexual, and transgender (LGBT) persons was a problem, and LGBT individuals often kept their status secret from the community for fear of being harassed or discriminated against". Involuntary conversion therapies, both religious and ritualistic, are widespread.

== Summary table ==
| Same-sex sexual activity legal | Yes (1960-2019, again since 2020) |
| Equal age of consent | No |
| Anti-discrimination laws in hate speech and violence | No |
| Anti-discrimination laws in employment | No |
| Anti-discrimination laws in the provision of goods and services | No |
| Anti-discrimination laws in all other areas (incl. indirect discrimination, hate speech) | Yes / No (in personal data only) |
| Same-sex marriage | No (Constitutional ban on same-sex marriage since 2025) |
| Recognition of same-sex couples | No |
| Step-child adoption by same-sex couples | No |
| Joint adoption by same-sex couples | No |
| Gays and lesbians allowed to serve openly in the military | Yes (Since 2020) |
| Right to change legal gender | No |
| Access to IVF for lesbians | No |
| Commercial surrogacy for gay male couples | No |
| MSMs allowed to donate blood | No |

== See also ==
- LGBTQ rights in Africa
- Human rights in Africa
