= Murielle Minkoue Mintsa =

Gabonese politician (born 1970)

Murielle Minsta Mi-Owono

Minister of Institutional Reform
- In office 9 September 2023 – 4 May 2025
- President: Brice Oligui Nguema
- Prime Minister: Raymond Ndong Sima

Personal details
- Born: Murielle Minkoue Mezui; July 22, 1970 (age 56) Libreville, Gabon
- Education: Université Omar Bongo
- Occupation: Politician, magistrate
- Profession: Magistrate
- Awards: Ordre de l'Étoile équatoriale

Murielle Minkoue Mezui épouse Minsta Mi-Owono (born 22 July 1970) is a Gabonese politician who serves as minister for institutional reform.

In 2024, she announced the date of the constitutional referendum.

== See also ==
- Viviane Biviga
