= Recognition of same-sex unions in Senegal =

Senegal does not recognize same-sex marriages or civil unions. The Family Code does not provide for the recognition of same-sex unions.

== Legal history ==
=== Background ===
Same-sex sexual relations are outlawed in Senegal under the Penal Code, which stipulates a penalty of up to ten years' imprisonment for consensual, private sexual relations between people of the same sex. In 2009, Foreign Minister Madické Niang said "there [had] been three cases where homosexuals were brought before the courts." Multiple other arrests and convictions have occurred since then. LGBT rights are greatly restricted in the country, with gays and lesbians experiencing severe societal and legal discrimination. Pre-election crackdown on LGBT rights are frequent, which activists attribute to politicians not wanting to seem "pro-homosexual". In 2016, President Macky Sall said he would "never" decriminalize homosexuality. In 2026, the Parliament of Senegal passed legislation doubling to 10 years the maximum prison term for sexual acts by same-sex partners and criminalising the "promotion" of homosexuality.

In January 2008, the Icone magazine reported on and published photographs of an alleged same-sex marriage in Dakar. The editor of the magazine, Mansour Dieng, claimed that he subsequently received death threats. Five men in the photographs were arrested, but were later released without charge. Subsequently, one of the men reported having been fired from his job, estranged from his friends and family and expressed his desire to move to Europe. In 2009, Minister Niang reported that "a foreign national who was already rather elderly married a young Senegalese boy. And I would like to warn you... that if an elderly man marries a young boy, the young boy does it so that he can emigrate and go in live in France or some other country abroad, that is the interest of the young person in getting married. This led to a conviction and an appeal was made against the conviction and ... the foreigner was able to leave the country after they were acquitted on appeal."

=== Restrictions ===
Same-sex sexual activity legal Same-sex marriage Limited recognition (foreign residency rights) No recognition of same-sex couples Same-sex sexual activity illegal Prison but not enforced Prison Death penalty on books but not enforced Enforced death penalty

Article 101 of the Family Code (French: Code de la Famille; Wolof: Kood bu Njaboot) defines marriage as a "solemn union of a man and a woman". (Note: French: Les fiançailles sont une convention solennelle par laquelle un homme et une femme se promettent mutuellement le mariage.) Further, article 111 of the code states that a marriage may "only be solemnized between a man at least 18 years of age and a woman at least 16 years of age". As a result, same-sex couples cannot marry in Senegal and do not have access to the legal rights, benefits and obligations of marriage, including protection from domestic violence, adoption rights, tax benefits and inheritance rights, among others. Civil unions, which would offer some of the rights and benefits of marriage, are likewise not recognised in Senegal.

The Constitution of Senegal does not expressly address same-sex marriage, but on 20 June 2026 the Parliament voted 129–0 in favour of a constitutional amendment to explicitly ban same-sex marriages. The move was viewed as political, with one anonymous citizen telling LGBT newspaper Erasing 76 Crimes that "[t]here is little doubt that [the ruling PASTEF party was] placing great emphasis on this aspect of constitutional change in order to reassure the Senegalese people that it [would] pursue an anti-LGBT agenda" and added that the amendment "help[ed] to rally the ranks within the ruling party following the rifts that [had] led to the dismissal of former Prime Minister Ousmane Sonko". The measure was passed synchronously as controversial amendments to the balance of power between the executive and legislative branches. President Bassirou Diomaye Faye challenged the amendments at the Constitutional Court, which struck them down on 9 July on the basis that the government was reportedly "prevented from submitting its observations through the channels normally provided for in the event of a constitutional overhaul." Erasing 76 Crimes reported that "the [LGBT community finds itself], through no fault of [its] own, at the centre of a power struggle between President Bassirou Diomaye Faye and Ousmane Sonko". Article 17 of the Constitution currently states:

Marriage and the family constitute the natural and moral base of the human community. They are placed under the protection of the State. (Note: French: Le mariage et la famille constituent la base naturelle et morale de la communauté humaine. Ils sont placés sous la protection de l'Etat.)

== Historical and customary recognition ==
While many modern-day Senegalese cultures historically practiced polygamy, there are no records of same-sex marriages being performed in local cultures in the way they are commonly defined in Western legal systems. However, there is evidence for identities and behaviours that may be placed on the LGBT spectrum. The Wolof traditionally recognised gender-nonconforming individuals called góor-jigéen (pronounced [ˈɡoːrˌɟiɡeːn], meaning "man-woman"). The term historically referred to men "who dressed like women and talked like women", though it has become pejorative in modern times and is now widely used as an insult for "homosexual". In the 1930s, the góor-jigéen were "integrated in the Senegalese society" and "[did] their best to deserve the epithet by their mannerisms, their dress, and their make-up; some even dress[ed] their hair like women. They [did] not suffer in any way socially… on the contrary, they [were] sought after as the best conversationalists and the best dancers." Scholars note they were present historically, but were later marginalized, framed in a rhetoric that constructs homosexuality as both "un-African" and incompatible with Islam. This erasure reflects "efforts to suppress all forms of sexual and gender diversity", as they "have always cohabited with the rest of society". This strongly indicates that non-heteronormative identities existed before modern politics and post-colonial nationalism and Islamic backlash. A 2013 article in the Cambridge University Press reported the "binary" of societal attitudes being largely negative to the West, while also using European imports and thought to denigrate locally-institutionalised sexual and gender variance.

== See also ==
- LGBT rights in Senegal
- Recognition of same-sex unions in Africa
