= 2024 Gabonese constitutional referendum =

Constitutional Referendum in Gabon

- 16 November 2024
- Do you accept a new constitution for the Gabonese Republic?

Results
Choice	Votes	%
Yes	381,581	91.64%
No	34,802	8.36%
Valid votes	416,383	90.09%
Invalid or blank votes	45,784	9.91%
Total votes	462,167	100.00%
Registered voters/turnout	853,028	54.18%
- Results by province For: 60-70% 80–90% >90%

A constitutional referendum was held and approved in Gabon on 16 November 2024. The vote was on a new constitution; it proposed, among other things, a 7-year presidential term, renewable once consecutively. The referendum led to the return to a civilian regime which the military junta promised after the coup d'état in 2023.

== Background ==
After 56 years of leadership under Omar Bongo and his son, Ali Bongo, the 2023 coup brought about military rule. In September 2024, a draft of the proposed new constitution was handed to transitional president Brice Oligui Nguema. Gabon’s parliamentarians submitted their proposed amendments ahead of a 22 September deadline.

The minister for institutional reform in Gabon, Murielle Minkoue Mintsa, announced that the referendum would take place on 16 November 2024.

== Constitution ==
The new constitution contains 173 articles. It includes a presidential system, abolishing the office of prime minister, with the President of Gabon limited to two consecutive seven-year terms, elected via the two-round system. The method of election and term of the president is entrenched. The role of the prime minister would be replaced by a new "Vice President of the Government" appointed by the President (thus meaning there would be two vice presidents in total, with the other known as the Vice President of the Republic). The working language of Gabon will continue to be French, but it will not be considered the state's "official language". Mandatory military service would be allowed under law. The new constitution would also define marriage as a union between a man and a woman via an entrenched clause, thus permanently banning same-sex marriage. The national holiday of 17 August is complemented by a "liberation day" on 30 August in honor of the 2023 coup d'état.

The initial insistence that "only people born to a Gabonese father and mother can run in the presidential election" was controversial among those of mixed heritage. This section was considered to prevent former first lady Sylvia Bongo Ondimba and her son Noureddin Bongo Valentin, both of whom have dual French-Gabonese nationality, from standing. Ultimately the requirement was amended to require a person:

- be born Gabonese to one Gabonese parent
- not possessing dual citizenship within 3 years of standing for election
- (if applicable) have a spouse that conforms to the prior two guidelines
- have resided within the territory of Gabon for at least 3 years prior to the election
- speak at least one national language
- not be a spouse or descendant of a current President
- be physically and mentally fit
- not be in a state of having their political rights suspended

Elections for the presidency must take place within 3 months of the end of the term.

The president would be allowed to call a state of emergency, under which extra powers as defined by law would be granted to them. The president may also dissolve the National Assembly once during a term after consultation with the presidents of both chambers and the Constitutional Court, provided it has been at least two years since the start of the term and that no indictment before the High Court of Justice is opened. In this case, a new election must be called within 60 days.

Members of the government must be a Gabonese citizen born to a Gabonese parent, be at least 30 years old, and not have their political rights suspended.

The National Assembly is bicameral, consisting of the National Assembly and Senate, both serving 5 year terms, with the latter being indirectly elected. Elections must take place between one and six months before the end of the term. The term of office begins on the date the Bureaux of the two chambers are elected.

The Constitutional Court would consist of 9 appointed members, plus ex officio members comprising former Presidents (provided they do not renounce that right and retain their political rights). The members serve eight year terms, with a maximum of two terms, and consist of three people appointed by the President, two each by the president of the National Assembly and Senate, and two by the High Council of the Judiciary. Re-elections would take place by members of the Court.

Wording on property ownership was included, stating that everyone has the right to property, but that "the conditions and procedures for access to property shall be determined by law", in theory enabling restrictions. Cloning of human beings would be banned. Amnesty would be granted to anyone who participated in the 2023 coup d'état.

The new constitution will come into force following the next presidential election.

== Conduct ==
The provisional government authorized international observers to observe the referendum, something that was not permitted for the 2023 Gabonese general election. Ballot papers used in the referendum were color-coded, with green ballots meaning "yes" and red ones meaning "no". Around 2,835 polling stations were utilised for the procedure, which ran from 07:00 to 18:00. A night-time curfew was declared for safety reasons.

== Results ==
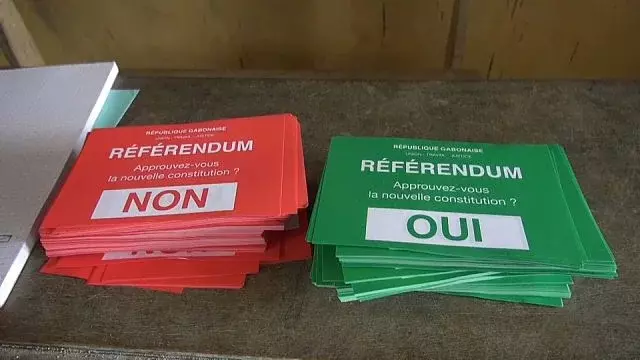
Ballots used for the 2024 referendum

On 17 November, Interior Minister Hermann Immongault said that the referendum had passed with over 91% support after an estimated 53% turnout but that the final results would be announced later by the Constitutional Court. On 29 November, the Constitutional Court validated the results of the referendum, definitively adopting the constitution. On 19 December, the new constitution was promulgated by the president.

Choice	Votes	%
Yes	381,581	91.64
No	34,802	8.36
Total	416,383	100.00
Valid votes	416,383	90.09
Invalid/blank votes	45,784	9.91
Total votes	462,167	100.00
Registered voters/turnout	853,028	54.18
Source: TV Plus Afrique

== Aftermath ==
The President of the African Union Commission, Moussa Faki Mahamat, congratulated the holding of the referendum and the return to constitutional order in Gabon. The adoption of the new constitution by the population established the Second Republic.
