= France–Gabon relations =

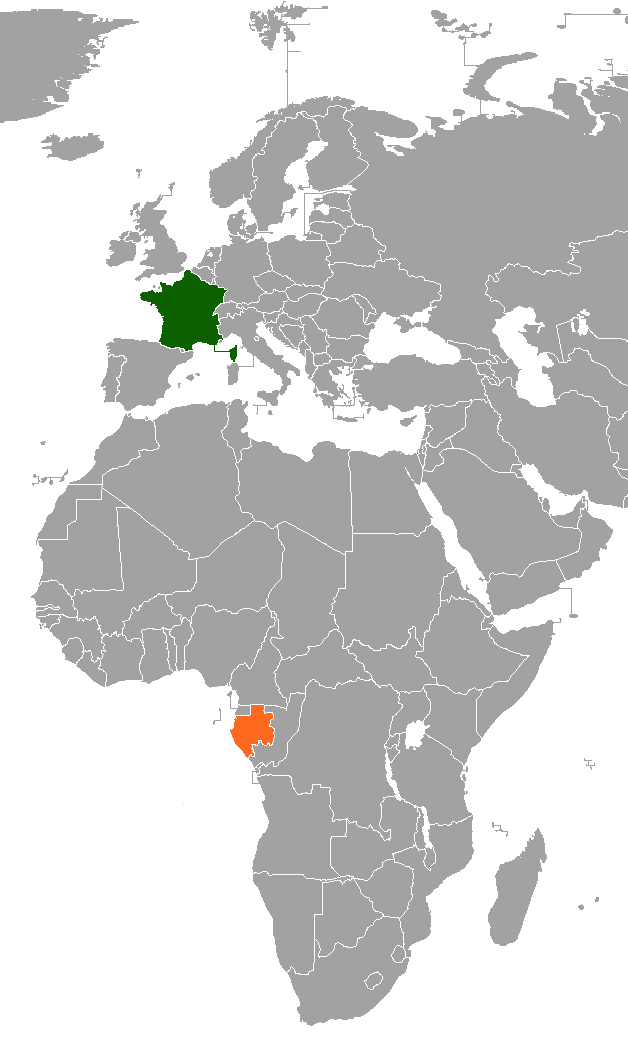
- France: Gabon

France–Gabon relations are the current and historical relations between France and Gabon. Both nations are members of the Organisation internationale de la Francophonie and the United Nations.

== Pre-independence relations ==
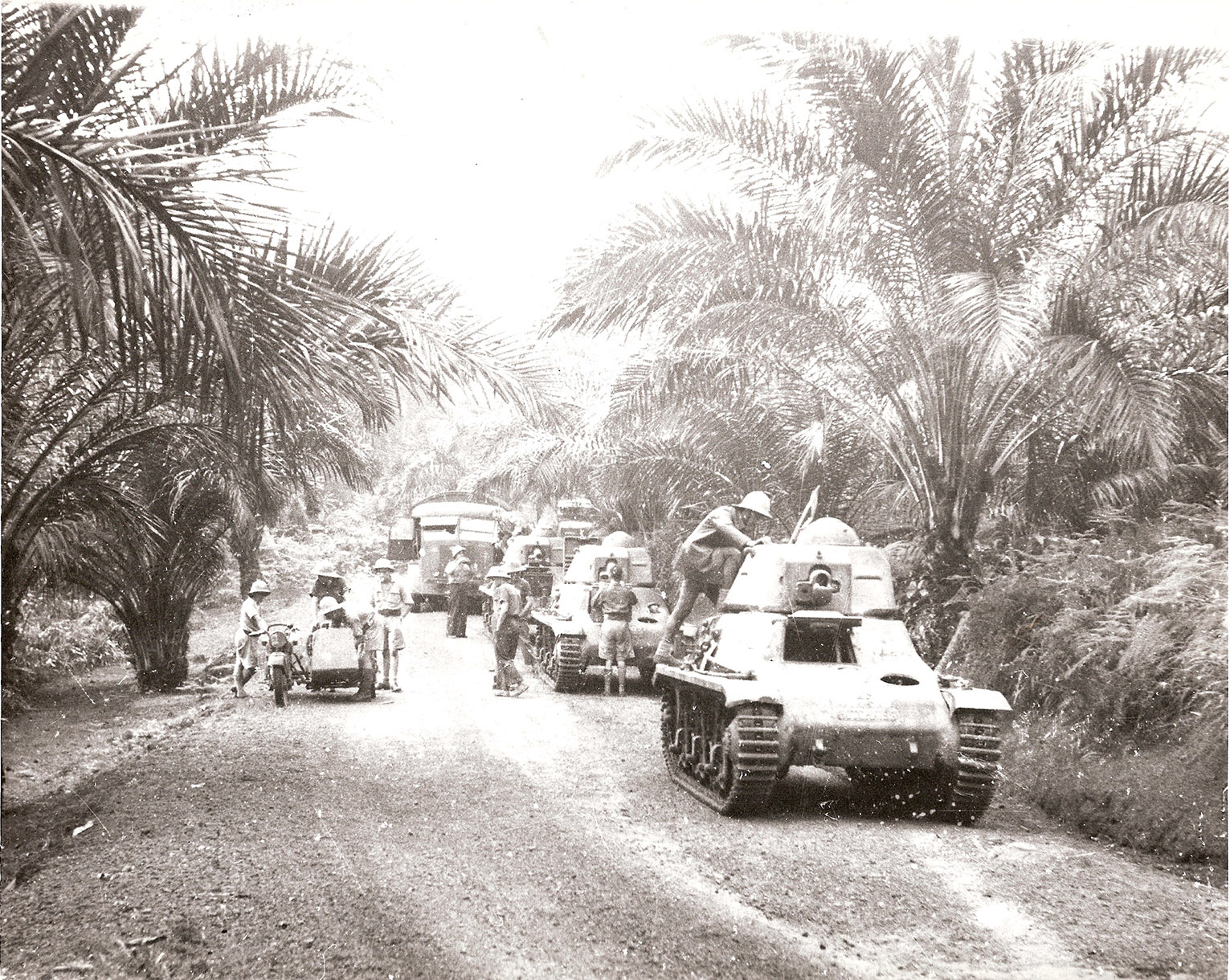
Free French tanks during the Battle of Gabon

France first established relations with Gabon in the early 19th century, signing protection treaties with local chiefs in 1839 and 1841. In 1885, during the scramble for Africa, France claimed Gabon as a territory. French administration formally began in 1903, and Gabon became part of the federation of French Equatorial Africa in 1910. The colony remained part of the federation until 1959.

During World War II, Gabon was briefly under the control of Vichy France but was recaptured by Free French forces in November 1940 after the Battle of Gabon. Gabon achieved independence from France in August 1960, alongside the other territories of French Equatorial Africa.

== Post-independence relations ==
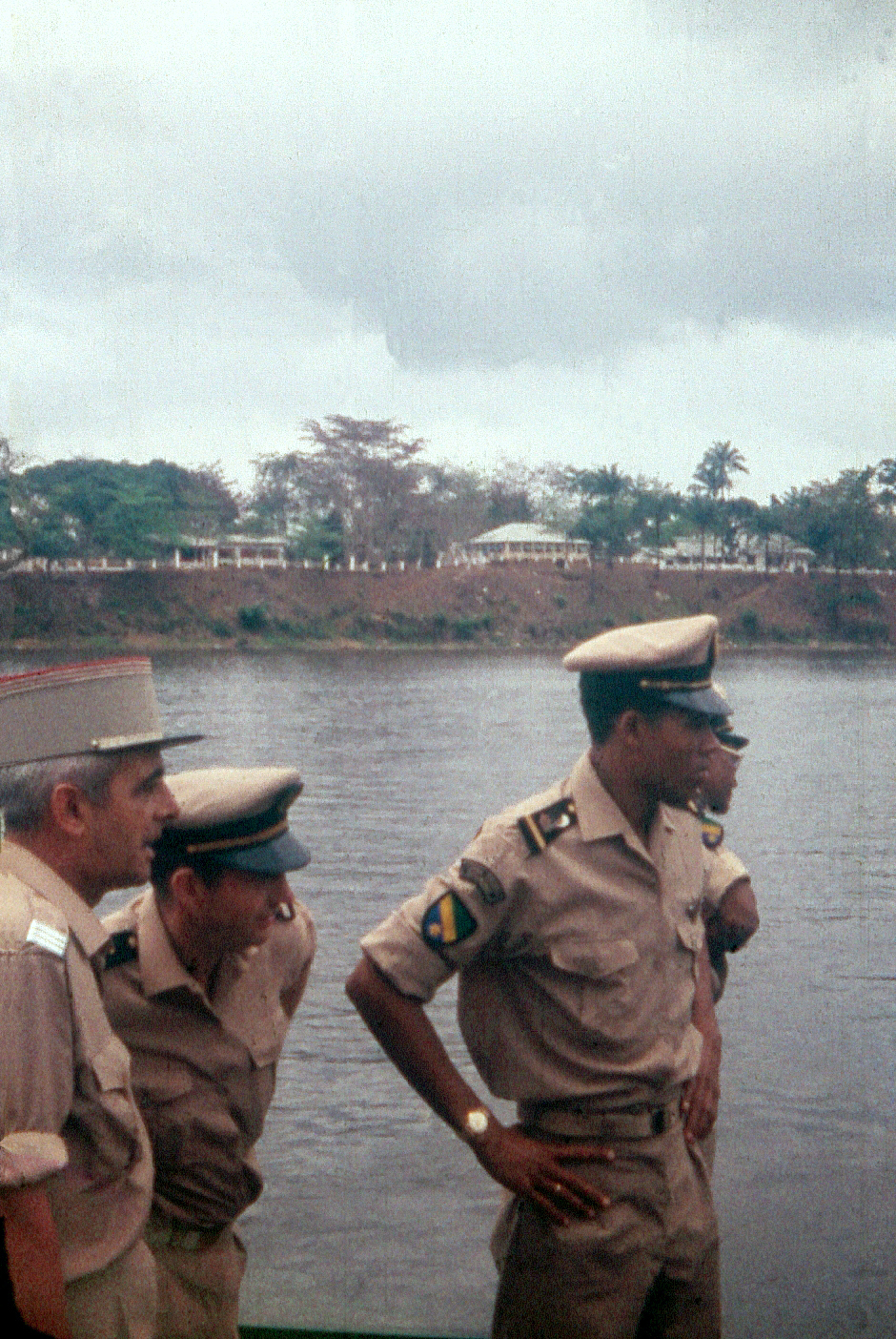
Gabonese and French military officers, 1959

Following independence, Gabon remained one of France's closest allies in Africa. Gabon's strategic resources, including uranium and oil, significantly shaped Franco-Gabonese relations during the 1960s. France relied on Gabon's uranium for its Force de frappe (nuclear deterrent) and, following the loss of French Algeria, on Gabon's oil to support its policy of energy independence.

In February 1964, French troops intervened during the 1964 Gabon coup d'état to restore the Gabonese government. French citizens in Gabon at the time accused the United States of involvement, leading to anti-American demonstrations and the 1964 United States Embassy in Libreville bombings.

=== Omar Bongo Era ===
Omar Bongo ruled Gabon from 1967 until his death in 2009, fostering extensive French involvement in Gabon's political, economic, and military spheres. French oil company Elf Aquitaine developed substantial interests in Gabon during his presidency. Gabon served as a military hub for French operations in Africa, solidifying its role as a critical ally.

By 2008, around 10,000 French nationals resided in Gabon, and the French 6th Marine Infantry Battalion maintained a permanent presence in the country. When Omar Bongo died in 2009, French leaders Nicolas Sarkozy and Jacques Chirac were among the few Western heads of state to attend his funeral.

=== Ali Bongo Ondimba Era ===
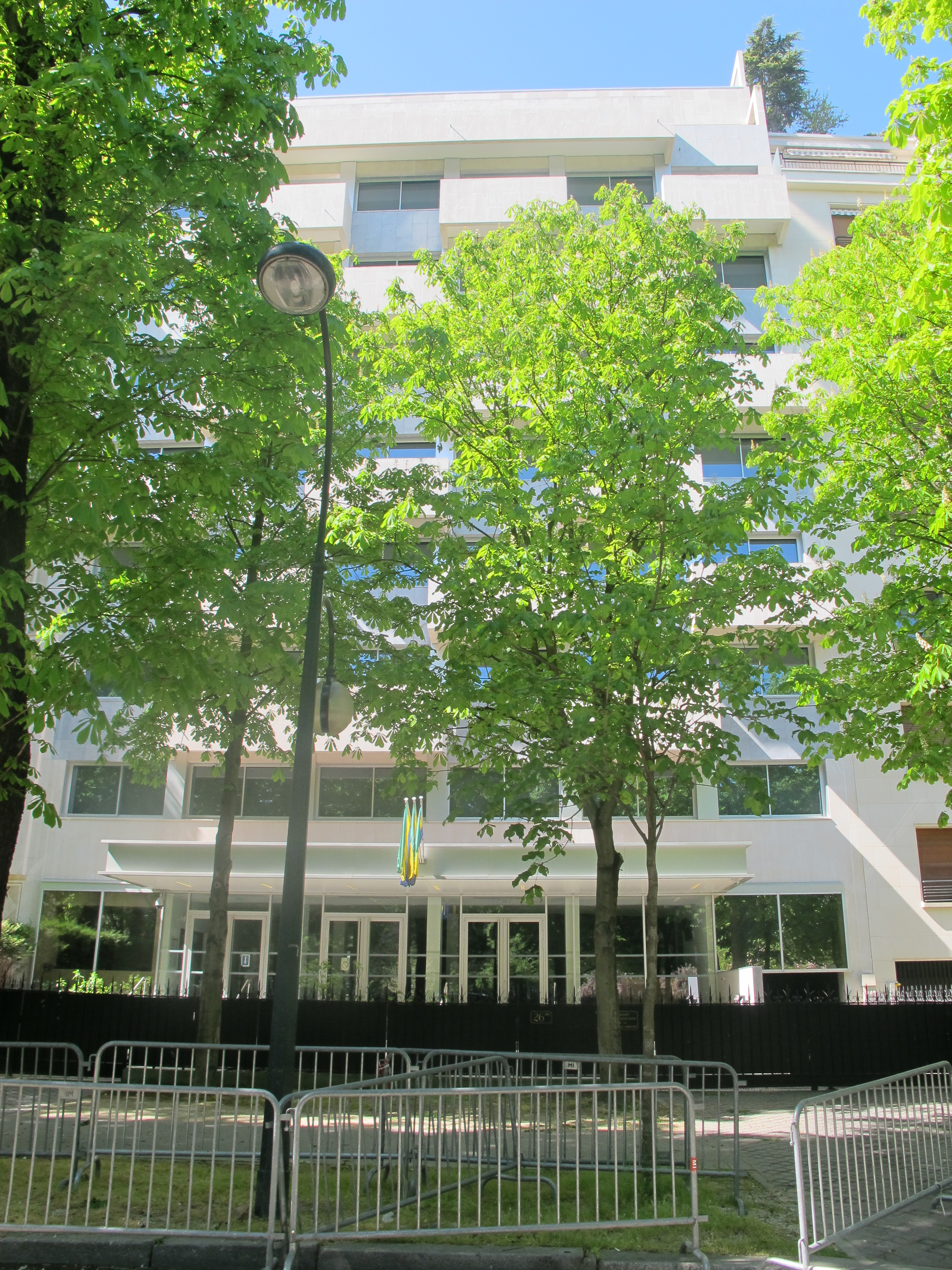
Embassy of Gabon in Paris

After Omar Bongo's death, his son, Ali Bongo Ondimba, assumed power. While Ali Bongo maintained strong ties with France, his rule faced controversy, including allegations of voter fraud during the 2016 election. The French foreign ministry expressed concerns about the transparency of the election process.

Despite these challenges, Gabon continued to play a pivotal role in France's African policy. French military forces stationed in Gabon supported regional stability operations, and French companies remained active in Gabon's resource extraction sectors.

=== Brice Oligui Clotaire Nguema ===
The 6th Marine Infantry Battalion, stationed in the capital Libreville since 1975, is no more. Since the summer of 2024, the 6th Marine Infantry Battalion has been replaced by a military academy. Camp de Gaulle, which will be renamed a training camp shared and co-managed by France and Gabon. Of the 380 French soldiers in 2023, only about a hundred will remain by July 1, 2025.

== Resident diplomatic missions ==
- France has an embassy in Libreville.
- Gabon has an embassy in Paris.

== See also ==
- Françafrique
- Conseil présidentiel pour l'Afrique
- La Francophone
