= Recognition of same-sex unions in Kosovo =

Kosovo does not recognize same-sex marriages or civil unions. On 25 April 2024, Prime Minister Albin Kurti announced the government's intention to legalize civil unions as part of a new civil code.

== Civil unions ==
Laws regarding same-sex partnerships in Europe¹ Marriage Civil union Limited domestic recognition (cohabitation) Unrecognized Constitution limits marriage to opposite-sex couples ¹ May include recent laws or court decisions that have not yet entered into effect.

Kosovo does not recognize civil unions (Albanian: bashkim civil, pronounced [baʃˈkim tsiˈvil]; Serbian: животно партнерство, životno partnerstvo, pronounced [ʒǐvotno pârtnerstvo]) (Note: Bosnian: životno partnerstvo, животно партнерство; Turkish: medeni birliktelik; Romani: registrime partneripe) which would offer same-sex couples some of the rights, benefits and obligations of marriage. Despite not being a member state of the Council of Europe, Kosovo is de facto under the jurisdiction of the European Court of Human Rights (ECHR). In January 2023, the Grand Chamber of the European Court of Human Rights ruled in Fedotova and Others v. Russia that Article 8 of the European Convention on Human Rights, which guarantees a right to private and family life, imposes a positive obligation on all member states of the Council of Europe to establish a legal framework recognizing same-sex partnerships. The court later issued similar rulings with respect to Poland in Przybyszewska and Others, Romania in Buhuceanu and Others, Bulgaria in Koilova and Babulkova, and Ukraine in Maymulakhin and Markiv.

On 7 July 2020, Minister of Justice Selim Selimi announced that the government planned to introduce a new civil code "within a few months" that would legalize same-sex civil partnerships. The move was criticised by some LGBT rights groups because it would have entrenched a legal distinction between opposite-sex and same-sex couples. If the civil code had been passed, an additional law detailing the rights, benefits and obligations of civil partners would have been required. The draft was rejected at first reading by the Assembly on 16 March 2022 in a 28–29 vote with 4 abstentions. On 25 April 2024, Prime Minister Albin Kurti re-announced his government's intention to legalize same-sex unions. "Kosovo will make an effort to soon become the second country in the Western Balkans, after Montenegro, which guarantees its citizens the right to a same-sex life partnership. We will work hard to pass this in the near future", said Kurti, who also announced his government's intention to "meet the rights and needs" of the Serbian minority. Several Muslim and Christian denominations publicly called on the government to reject a new civil code recognising same-sex unions, incorrectly stating that the new code would legalise same-sex marriage. In October 2026, the Ministry of Justice opened a draft civil code containing provisions recognising same-sex unions to public consultation.

== Same-sex marriage ==
In 2014, the President of the Constitutional Court, Enver Hasani, said that Kosovo de jure allows same-sex marriage. Hasani based his reasoning on Article 24(2) of the Constitution of Kosovo, which states that "no one shall be discriminated against on grounds of race, color, gender, language, religion, political or other opinion, national or social origin, relation to any community, property, economic and social condition, sexual orientation, birth, disability or other personal status." Additionally, Article 37 of the Constitution states:

Based on free will, everyone enjoys the right to marry and the right to have a family as provided by law. (Note: In the official languages of Kosovo: Albanian: Në bazë të pëlqimit të lirë, çdokush gëzon të drejtën të martohet dhe të drejtën që të krijojë familje në pajtim me ligjin.; Serbian: Свако има право на склапање брака, на основу слободног избора супружника и право на заснивање породице у сагласности са законом., Svako ima pravo na sklapanje braka, na osnovu slobodnog izbora supružnika i pravo na zasnivanje porodice u saglasnosti sa zakonom.)

Article 14 of the Law on Family (Albanian: Ligji për familjen; Serbian: Закон о породици, Zakon o porodici) defines marriage as a "legally registered community of two persons of different sexes," though LGBT activists have argued that this wording contradicts Article 24 of the Constitution and have called on same-sex couples to challenge the law in court.

== Public opinion ==
A December 2022 Ipsos survey showed that 20% of Kosovars considered same-sex marriage "acceptable" (9% "completely" and 11% "mainly"), while 77% considered it "unacceptable" (67% "completely" and 10% "mainly"). This represented an increase of support from 2015 when 12% of Kosovars supported same-sex marriage. With regard to specific rights, 45% of respondents supported the right of same-sex couples to receive survivor pension benefits in case of the partner's death.

== See also ==
- LGBT rights in Kosovo
- Recognition of same-sex unions in Europe
- Balkan sworn virgins (burrnesha; women who take a vow of chastity and live as men, sometimes to avoid arranged marriages or to be able to inherit the family's wealth)
