= Recognition of same-sex unions in Bosnia and Herzegovina =

Bosnia and Herzegovina does not recognize same-sex marriages or civil unions. In 2018, the Government of the Federation of Bosnia and Herzegovina, one of the two entities forming Bosnia and Herzegovina, announced its intention to legalize civil unions.

== Civil unions ==
Laws regarding same-sex partnerships in Europe¹ Marriage Civil union Limited domestic recognition (cohabitation) Unrecognized Constitution limits marriage to opposite-sex couples ¹ May include recent laws or court decisions that have not yet entered into effect.

Bosnia and Herzegovina does not recognise civil partnerships (Bosnian: građansko partnerstvo, грађанско партнерство, pronounced [ɡrâdʑanskoː pârtnerstvo]; Croatian: građansko partnerstvo; Serbian: građansko partnerstvo, грађанско партнерство) (Note: Turkish: medeni birliktelik, pronounced [medeˈni biɾlicteˈlic]; Romani: registrime partneripe; Ladino: unyón sivile) which would offer same-sex couples some of the rights, benefits and obligations of marriage. Same-sex couples face many legal challenges in Bosnia and Herzegovina. They do not enjoy recognition or legal protection "which significantly limits their exercise of various rights that are available to heterosexual couples". Same-sex partners are not eligible for tax benefits or housing loans. In addition, if one partner dies, the other partner does not have the right to legally inherit the estate and goods of the deceased partner. If one partner is hospitalized, the other also does not have the right to visit as they will not be considered a family member. According to Amil Brković, a lawyer and legal advisor from the Sarajevo Open Centre, "as an alternative to seeking court recognition, some same-sex couples have decided to conclude a lifetime maintenance contract with a notary, and regulate the issue of inheritance through a will." "These alternative directions are neither a stable nor a long-term solution for protecting the family life of same-sex couples in Bosnia and Herzegovina", he said.

As a member of the Council of Europe, Bosnia and Herzegovina falls under the jurisdiction of the European Court of Human Rights (ECHR). In January 2023, the Grand Chamber of the European Court of Human Rights ruled in Fedotova and Others v. Russia that Article 8 of the European Convention on Human Rights, which guarantees a right to private and family life, imposes a positive obligation on all member states of the Council of Europe to establish a legal framework recognizing same-sex partnerships. The court later issued similar rulings with respect to Poland in Przybyszewska and Others, Romania in Buhuceanu and Others, Bulgaria in Koilova and Babulkova, and Ukraine in Maymulakhin and Markiv.

On 19 October 2018, the Government of the Federation of Bosnia and Herzegovina adopted a request for the legalisation of civil unions. "The said item was on the session agenda and it was adopted in the same form as it was proposed," said Prime Minister Fadil Novalić. The government formed a working group to analyse the proposal, which would need to be adopted by the Parliament. The working group was established in January 2020 and was due to start working in April 2020, but was postponed due to the COVID-19 pandemic. Public consultations on the rights of same-sex couples were held in December 2022. In June 2023, the government accepted the working group's report and announced its intention to begin drafting legislation. "From June 2023 to [March 2024], this step has not even started because the Federal Ministry of Health is waiting to appoint its expert, while other ministries have done it on time", said Amil Brković. Brković called for the government to urgently pass civil union legislation: "It is necessary to legally and comprehensively regulate the legal position of persons in same-sex unions."

== Same-sex marriage ==
There is no legal recognition of same-sex couples on a national or subnational level. The Constitution of Bosnia and Herzegovina remains silent on gender eligibility for marriage. The only mention of marriage in the Constitution is in Article 2(3), which states that "all persons within the territory of Bosnia and Herzegovina shall enjoy the human rights and fundamental freedoms referred to in paragraph 2 above; these include [...] the right to marry and to found a family [...]". On a subnational scale, both entities, the Federation of Bosnia and Herzegovina and the Republika Srpska, as well as the Brčko District, limit marriage to opposite-sex couples, as prescribed by their respective family codes. Article 4(1) of the Family Law of the Brčko District states that "marriage is a legally regulated union of life between a man and a woman". The Family Law of the Republika Srpska and the Family Law of the Federation of Bosnia and Herzegovina contain an identical article.

There are cases of same-sex couples from Bosnia and Herzegovina going to neighbouring countries to marry, and then, upon returning home to Bosnia and Herzegovina, asking the domestic registry authorities to recognize their foreign marriage licenses "in order to exercise their rights in [Bosnia and Herzegovina]". All these cases have ended up before the courts and are awaiting decisions.

== Public opinion ==
According to a 2017 Pew Research Center poll, 13% of respondents in Bosnia and Herzegovina supported same-sex marriage, while 84% opposed and 3% were undecided or had refused to answer. Support was 14% among Muslims, 8% among Orthodox Christians and 7% among Catholics. A 2019 poll by Valicon showed that 14% of Sarajevo Canton residents supported the legalisation of same-sex marriage, while 81% opposed.

A December 2022 Ipsos survey showed that 26% of Bosnians considered same-sex marriage "acceptable" (11% "completely" and 15% "mainly"), while 71% considered it "unacceptable" (56% "completely" and 15% "mainly"). This represented an increase of support from 2015 when 9% of Bosnians supported same-sex marriage. With regard to specific rights, 59% of respondents supported the right of same-sex couples to receive survivor pension benefits in case of the partner's death.

A 2023 survey from the Sarajevo Open Centre (Sarajevski Otvoreni Centar) estimated that 53% of Bosnians supported same-sex civil partnerships, while 26% were opposed and 21% were undecided.

== See also ==
- LGBT rights in Bosnia and Herzegovina
- Recognition of same-sex unions in Europe
