= Recognition of same-sex unions in Belarus =

Belarus does not recognize any form of legal recognition for same-sex couples. The Constitution of Belarus bans the legal recognition of same-sex marriage.

== Civil unions ==
Belarus does not recognise same-sex registered partnerships (Belarusian: грамадзянскае партнёрства, hramadzjánskaje partnjórstva, pronounced [ɣramaˈdzʲanska.je partˈnʲɔrstva]; Russian: гражданское партнёрство, graždánskoje partnjórstvo, pronounced [ɡrɐʐˈdanskə.jə pɐrtˈnʲɵrstvə]) which would offer some of the rights and benefits of marriage. Belarus is not a member state of the Council of Europe and thus does not fall under the jurisdiction of the European Court of Human Rights (ECHR). In January 2023, the Grand Chamber of the European Court of Human Rights ruled in Fedotova and Others v. Russia that Article 8 of the European Convention on Human Rights, which guarantees a right to private and family life, imposes a positive obligation on all member states of the Council of Europe to recognize same-sex partnerships. The court later issued similar rulings with respect to Poland in Przybyszewska and Others, Romania in Buhuceanu and Others, Bulgaria in Koilova and Babulkova, and Ukraine in Maymulakhin and Markiv.

== Same-sex marriage ==
Laws regarding same-sex partnerships in Europe¹ Marriage Civil union Limited domestic recognition (cohabitation) Unrecognized Constitution limits marriage to opposite-sex couples ¹ May include recent laws or court decisions that have not yet entered into effect.

The laws of Belarus do not allow or recognise same-sex marriage. Article 32 of the Constitution of Belarus, adopted in 1994, three years after independence from the Soviet Union, states:

Marriage as the union of a woman and a man, the family, maternity, paternity and childhood shall be protected by the State. A woman and a man, on reaching marriageable age, have the right to marry voluntarily and to create a family. Spouses have equal rights in marriage and family.

The Marriage and Family Code (Belarusian: Кодэкс аб шлюбе і сям'і, Kódeks ab šljúbje i sjamʺí; Russian: Кодекс о браке и семье, Kódeks o bráke i semʹjé) likewise bans the recognition of same-sex marriage. In April 2013, President Alexander Lukashenko said in his state-of-the-nation address that "we should not be forced to introduce same-sex marriages. This will not happen in the near future. That is for sure, when I am the president." In 2023, the National Assembly passed a motion "emphasising the protection and promotion of the traditional family, defined strictly as a union between a woman and a man by birth".

== Public opinion ==
A Pew Research Center poll published in May 2017 showed that 16% of Belarusians were in favor of same-sex marriage, while 81% were opposed and 3% were undecided or had refused to answer. This level of support was nonetheless higher than neighbouring countries, including Ukraine at 12% and Russia at 5%. Younger people were more likely to support same-sex marriage; 22% of 18–34-year-olds supported same-sex marriage compared to 14% of those aged 34 and above.

== See also ==
- LGBT rights in Belarus
- Recognition of same-sex unions in Europe
