= Recognition of same-sex unions in Slovakia =

Slovakia does not recognise same-sex marriage or civil unions. However, there is some limited legal recognition for cohabiting same-sex couples, notably with regard to inheritance rights. The Constitution of Slovakia has limited marriage to opposite-sex couples since 2014, and bills to allow same-sex civil partnerships have been introduced several times, most recently in 2023, but all have been rejected by the National Council of Slovakia. In May 2023, a group of lawmakers submitted a motion to the Constitutional Court to address the lack of legal recognition for same-sex couples, while a separate proceeding, initiated in March 2022, focuses on the refusal of Slovak authorities to grant permanent residency to the foreign same-sex spouses of Slovak citizens. The Constitutional Court accepted both petitions for review, but has yet to issue a final ruling.

In June 2018, the European Court of Justice (ECJ) ruled that the same-sex spouses of European Union citizens should be granted a right of residency in Slovakia. Slovak authorities announced they would comply with the ruling; however, media outlets reported in April 2026 that the government was refusing to comply and same-sex couples were still unable to meet residency requirements. The ECJ expanded on the previous ruling on 22 November 2025, when it ruled in Jakub Cupriak-Trojan and Mateusz Trojan v Wojewoda Mazowiecki, a Polish case, that all member states of the European Union must recognise same-sex marriages validly performed within the European Union.

== Limited legal rights ==
Since 2018, Slovak civil and penal law has recognised a new definition of a "close person" (Slovak: blízka osoba), previously limited to a sibling, relative or spouse. A family member or a person in a relationship shall be considered under law as a "close person" "if an injury suffered by one of them is reasonably felt by the other person as an injury suffered by him or her." Only limited rights are granted, namely in the area of inheritance. While the provision theoretically includes same-sex unions, it may be more difficult for these couples to prove their relationships and have their rights guaranteed.

In 2023, Minister of Justice Viliam Karas introduced a cohabitation bill to the National Council, which was approved at first reading in a 72–21 vote in May. However, later that same month, Jana Dubovcová, who succeeded Karas as minister of justice on 15 May, withdrew the legislative proposal due to criticism from LGBT organizations.

== Registered partnerships ==
=== Background ===
In 2008 and 2009, the Otherness Initiative (Iniciatíva Inakosť), an LGBT advocacy group, launched a public awareness campaign for the recognition of same-sex registered partnerships (Slovak: životné partnerstvo, pronounced [ˈʐiʋɔtɲeː ˈpartɲerstʋɔ]). (Note: Hungarian: bejegyzett élettársi kapcsolat, pronounced [ˈbɛ.jɛɟzɛtː ˈeːlɛtːaːrʃi ˈkɒptʃolɒt]; Rusyn: горожанськоє цимборенє, gorožans'koje tsimborenje; Romani: registrime partnerimo) Previously, bills to recognise same-sex civil partnerships had been defeated in 1997 and 2000. In January 2008, activists met with Deputy Prime Minister Dušan Čaplovič to discuss proposed partnership legislation. Iniciatíva Inakosť also held a number of public discussions about registered partnerships throughout 2008. During this time, the Green Party announced its support for registered partnerships for same-sex and opposite-sex couples.

As a member of the Council of Europe, Slovakia falls under the jurisdiction of the European Court of Human Rights (ECHR). In January 2023, the Grand Chamber of the European Court of Human Rights ruled in Fedotova and Others v. Russia that Article 8 of the European Convention on Human Rights, which guarantees a right to private and family life, imposes a positive obligation on all member states of the Council of Europe to establish a legal framework recognising same-sex partnerships. The ECHR has also issued similar rulings with respect to Romania in Buhuceanu and Others, Ukraine in Maymulakhin and Markiv, Bulgaria in Koilova and Babulkova, and Poland in Przybyszewska and Others and Andersen v. Poland.

=== Failed attempts in 2012–2023 ===
In March 2012, the Freedom and Solidarity (SaS) party announced that it would submit a draft law on registered partnerships. The partnership bill was submitted to the National Council on August 23. It would have granted same-sex couples similar rights and obligations as married couples, including alimony, inheritance, access to medical documentation and the right to a widow's and widower's pension, but excluding adoption rights. On September 19, the ruling Direction – Social Democracy (Smer) party announced that it would vote against the bill, which was later rejected by a 14–94 vote in November 2012. In August 2017, Deputy Speaker of the National Council Lucia Ďuriš Nicholsonová promised to re-submit draft legislation on registered partnerships to Parliament. On 11 December 2017, following a meeting with Iniciatíva Inakosť representatives, President Andrej Kiska called for a public debate on the rights of same-sex couples. That same day, SaS reiterated its intention to introduce a registered partnership bill. SaS introduced its partnership bill to the National Council in July 2018. Under the proposed bill, partnerships would have been open to both same-sex and opposite-sex couples and would have granted couples several rights and benefits enjoyed by married couples, namely in the areas of inheritance and healthcare. The bill was defeated in September 2018, with only 31 out of 150 lawmakers in support.

In 2021, the Progressive Slovakia party introduced a life partnership bill, but it was rejected in a 7–67 vote in October 2021. MP Tomáš Valášek reintroduced a life partnership bill in 2022, but it was once again rejected in a 31–53 vote in October 2022. In August 2022, SaS introduced a cohabitation agreement bill to the National Council which would have granted couples various rights, including co-ownership, inheritance, access to health documentation, the right to a widow's and widower's pension and the right to nursing allowance. A vote on the legislation took place only a few days after a terrorist attack on a gay bar in Bratislava in October 2022, but it failed to gather the sufficient number of votes. The bill was supported by 50 MPs with 37 opposed, but failed as it required 76 votes to pass. President Zuzana Čaputová criticized the bill's defeat, saying, "We need to act. Our society is not threatened by the love of two people of the same sex or their partnership." The Catholic Church opposed the legislation, and was widely criticized by civil society after Archbishop Ján Orosch said that the two victims of the terrorist attack were "steeped in immoral behaviour" and "should not have been referred to as innocent".

In 2023, registered partnerships were opposed by most Slovak political parties represented in the National Council, including For the People, the Christian Union, People's Party Our Slovakia, Ordinary People and Independent Personalities, Direction – Social Democracy, and We Are Family. Progressive Slovakia, Freedom and Solidarity, Voice – Social Democracy, and some Smer members were in favour. Another partnership bill was introduced to Parliament by SaS in April 2023, but failed to pass before the September 2023 parliamentary election. In May 2023, a group of lawmakers filed a lawsuit with the Constitutional Court of Slovakia arguing that Parliament's failure to pass legislation recognizing same-sex couples was contrary to the Constitution and Slovakia's international obligations.

== Same-sex marriage ==
Laws regarding same-sex partnerships in Europe¹ Marriage Civil union Limited domestic recognition (cohabitation) Unrecognized Constitution limits marriage to opposite-sex couples ¹ May include recent laws or court decisions that have not yet entered into effect.

=== Constitutional ban and 2015 referendum ===
In January 2014, the Christian Democratic Movement (KDH) announced that it would submit a draft law to prohibit same-sex marriage in the Slovak Constitution. In February 2014, Minister of Culture Marek Maďarič said that enough Smer MPs supported the constitutional ban for it to pass. Shortly thereafter, 40 MPs introduced a draft amendment to the National Council seeking to enshrine the ban in the Slovak Constitution. Prime Minister Robert Fico indicated that the governing Smer party would back the proposal in exchange for the opposition's support on a separate amendment concerning changes to the judicial system. The bill passed its first reading in a 103–5 vote in March 2014. The amendment would cause any future laws recognising same-sex marriage to be unconstitutional. The bill was passed with 102 MPs voting for and 18 against in June 2014, and it was signed by President Ivan Gašparovič. Article 41(1) now reads as follows:

Marriage is a unique union between a man and a woman. The Slovak Republic protects marriage in all of its aspects and supports its welfare. Marriage, parenthood and family are under the protection of the law. Special protection of children and juveniles is guaranteed. (Note: In some languages of Slovakia: Slovak: Manželstvo je jedinečný zväzok medzi mužom a ženou. Slovenská republika manželstvo všestranne chráni a napomáha jeho dobru. Manželstvo, rodičovstvo a rodina sú pod ochranou zákona. Zaručuje sa osobitná ochrana detí a mladistvých.; Hungarian: A házasság egyedülálló kötelék férfi és nő között. A Szlovák Köztársaság teljeskörűen védi és támogatja a házasság intézményét. A házasság, a szülőség és a család törvényi védelem alatt áll. A gyermekeket és fiatalkorúakat különleges védelem illeti meg.; Rusyn: Манжелство є унікатным звязком меджі мужом і женов. Словацька републіка многосторонно хранить і помагать ёго добру. Манжелство, родічовство і родина суть під охранов закона. Ґарантує ся шпеціално охрана дїтей і недорослых.; Romani: O bijav hino o unikatno solacharipen maškar o murš the e džuvľi. E Slovačiko republika sakovar arakhel o bijav a pomožinel ki o leskero lačhipen. O bijav, te avel o dad, te avel e daj, the e fameľija hine tel o arakhipen khatar o zakonos. Garantinel pes o špecijalno arakhipen vaš o čhavore the o terne tel o 18 berša.)

In December 2013, a conservative civil initiative group, the Alliance for the Family (Aliancia za rodinu), announced that it would push for a constitutional definition of marriage as "a union solely between a woman and a man". The group intended to initiate referendums on several issues, and called for a ban on same-sex adoption and the prohibition of sex education in schools. They also suggested that other types of cohabitation should not be held equal to marriage between a man and a woman. The group also criticised Swedish company IKEA for its corporate magazine which featured two lesbians raising a son. By August 2014, the group had collected more than 400,000 signatures for a petition to hold a referendum on four questions. (Note: The four questions were: 1. Do you agree that no other cohabitation of persons other than a bond between one man and one woman can be called marriage?; 2. Do you agree that same-sex couples or groups should not be allowed to adopt children and subsequently raise them?; 3. Do you agree that no other cohabitation of persons other than marriage should be granted particular protection, rights and duties that the legislative norms as of 1 March 2014 only grant to marriage and to spouses (mainly acknowledgement, registration, or recording as a life community in front of a public authority, the possibility to adopt a child by the spouse of a parent)?; 4. Do you agree that schools cannot require children to participate in education pertaining to sexual behaviour or euthanasia if their parents or the children themselves do not agree with the content of the education?) President Andrej Kiska asked the Constitutional Court to consider the proposed questions. In October 2014, the Constitutional Court ruled that the third question, which pertained to the recognition of cohabitation outside of marriage, was unconstitutional. A referendum on the three other questions was held on 7 February 2015. All three proposals were approved, but the referendum was declared invalid due to insufficient turnout (21.07%). The referendum required a 50% turnout to be valid. Opponents, including human rights activists, had advised voters to boycott the referendum.

The Progressive Slovakia party supports same-sex marriage. Ahead of the 2023 election, party leader Michal Šimečka said the party is "a strong backer of a human rights agenda including same-sex marriage".

=== Recognition of marriages performed abroad ===
On 5 June 2018, the European Court of Justice (ECJ) ruled in favour of a Romanian-American same-sex couple seeking recognition of their marriage in Romania, so that the American partner could reside in the country. The court held in Coman and Others v General Inspectorate for Immigration and Ministry of the Interior that European Union (EU) member states must uphold the freedom of movement and residency rights of same-sex spouses, provided that one partner is an EU citizen. While EU member states may choose whether to legalise same-sex marriage, they cannot restrict the right of residence for EU citizens and their spouses. The ECJ also clarified that the term "spouse" is gender-neutral and does not necessarily refer to someone of the opposite sex. While the Ministry of the Interior, led by Denisa Saková, announced it would comply with the ruling, media outlets reported in April 2026 that same-sex couples were still unable to meet residency requirements because the Act on the Residence of Foreigners (Slovak: Zákon o pobyte cudzincov) mandates that spouses possess a valid marriage license and marriage under Slovak family law is defined as a "union between a man and a woman". The decision was welcomed by the International Lesbian, Gay, Bisexual, Trans and Intersex Association (ILGA) and other human rights groups, but condemned by the Slovak Catholic Church.

In 2022, the Žilina Regional Court ruled that immigration authorities' refusal to recognize the marriage of a Slovak national, Jakub Šanko de Ruiz, and his Argentine partner, Mariano Ruiz de Šanko, for the purposes of granting permanent residency to Ruiz de Šanko was unconstitutional. The court found that the refusal constituted unjustified discrimination based on sexual orientation, violated the right to private and family life and prevented a Slovak citizen from returning to his home country. A lawsuit was initiated in March 2022 by Ombudsperson Mária Patakyová to challenge the refusal of Slovak authorities to grant permanent residency to the foreign same-sex spouses of Slovak citizens. While the Constitutional Court has accepted the petition for review, it has yet to issue a final ruling.

In September 2025, the National Council adopted a constitutional amendment establishing the precedence of the Slovak Constitution over EU law regarding "fundamental cultural and ethical issues" and "national identity" matters, though the European Commission launched legal action against the amendment in November 2025. On 22 November, the European Court of Justice expanded on the Coman and Others ruling, holding in Jakub Cupriak-Trojan and Mateusz Trojan v Wojewoda Mazowiecki, a Polish case, that all member states of the European Union must recognise same-sex marriages validly performed within the European Union. The case involved a dual Polish-German couple who had married in Germany but sought recognition of their marriage in Poland. Slovakia is therefore legally obliged to comply with the ruling. If the government refuses to process marriage licenses from same-sex couples, those couples can challenge the decision in Slovak courts, which are bound to apply EU law. The ruling had an immediate legal effect in Slovakia, with media outlets reporting that "authorities must recognize same-sex marriages performed abroad as full marriages". Cupriak-Trojan and Trojan does not compel Slovakia to change its domestic laws to legalise same-sex marriage, but it does require that the country accept the legal status of couples married elsewhere in the European Union. The government strongly opposed the court decision. On 12 June 2026, Prime Minister Robert Fico announced the government's plan to ban the recognition of same-sex marriages performed outside the country. In October, a same-sex couple legally married in Austria, Ivan Novotný and Metod Špaček, announced their intention to challenge the government's refusal to recognise their marriage in court.

=== Religious performance ===
The Catholic Church opposes same-sex marriage and does not allow its priests to officiate at such marriages. In December 2023, the Holy See published Fiducia supplicans, a declaration allowing Catholic priests to bless couples who are not considered to be married according to church teaching, including the blessing of same-sex couples. The Conference of Slovak Bishops issued a statement on 21 December calling the declaration "a gesture of the Church's attention to every person", adding that "[t]he bishops will familiarize themselves with the document and, if necessary, will look for suitable forms in the context of the local Church".

Other smaller Christian denominations, such as the Evangelical Church of the Augsburg Confession and the Reformed Christian Church, likewise do not perform same-sex marriages. However, "some of [their] clergy strive for a more inclusive approach", with ongoing discussions for pastoral care for LGBT individuals and their families in the Evangelical Church.

== Public opinion ==
Public opinion has shifted in Slovakia in the past few years, becoming more favourable to granting rights to same-sex couples. A 2008 poll commissioned by Iniciatíva Inakosť showed that 42% of Slovaks supported same-sex registered partnerships, while 45% were opposed. In addition, 47% supported "mutual maintenance duty among partners", 41% supported tax benefits, 45% supported spousal pensions for a deceased partner, 64% supported access to information about the medical condition of a partner, 54% supported the right to a day-off if the partner requires accompaniment to the doctor, 69% supported the right to bereavement leave, 58% supported the right to mutual inheritance, 55% supported the possibility to establish undivided co-ownership, and 58% supported the right to nursing benefits during care for a sick partner. According to a similar poll conducted in 2009, 45% of respondents supported same-sex registered partnerships, while 41% were opposed, and 14% were unsure. Support for specific rights was higher, with 56% supporting the right of same-sex couples to jointly own property, 72% supporting access to medical information about the partner and 71% supporting the right to bereavement leave. A 2012 commissioned by Iniciatíva Inakosť showed that 47% of Slovaks supported registered partnerships, while 38% were opposed. Support for specific rights had also increased in comparison to 2009, with 57% supporting the right of same-sex couples to jointly own property, 75% supported access to medical information about the partner and 73% supporting the right to bereavement leave.

The 2015 Eurobarometer found that 24% of Slovaks supported same-sex marriage, while 69% were opposed. EU-wide support was 61%. At the same time, a poll conducted by the Focus Center for Social and Market Analysis (FOCUS; Centrum pre sociálnu a marketingovú analýzu) the same year showed that 50% of Slovaks supported registered partnerships, while 35% were opposed. A poll conducted in 2016 by the same polling organization showed that 40% of respondents supported partnrships, while 55% were opposed. The poll also showed that 27% of Slovaks were in favour of same-sex marriage and 20% were in favour of adoption by same-sex couples.

According to a 2017 Pew Research Center poll, 47% of Slovaks supported same-sex marriage, while 47% opposed and 6% undecided. Among 18–34-year-olds, opposition to same-sex marriage was 42%. The May 2019 Eurobarometer showed that 20% of Slovaks thought same-sex marriage should be allowed throughout Europe, while 70% were opposed. This was second lowest level of support in the European Union after Bulgaria, and significantly lower than the EU average of 69%. A 2019 survey conducted by the AKO polling agency found that 57% of Slovaks were in favour of same-sex registered partnerships. However, a FOCUS poll conducted the same year showed that only 30% of respondents supported registered partnerships, while 68% were opposed. 14.5% of respondents supported adoption by same-sex couples, while 83% were against.

According to a 2022 Ipsos poll, 49% of Slovaks were in favour of same-sex civil partnerships and 39% were opposed. In addition, 32% supported same-sex marriage with 55% opposed, and 29% supported adoption by same-sex partners with 58% against. The 2023 Eurobarometer found that 37% of respondents thought same-sex marriage should be allowed throughout Europe, while 56% were opposed. The survey also found that 47% of Slovaks thought that "there is nothing wrong in a sexual relationship between two persons of the same sex", while 48% disagreed.

== See also ==
- LGBT rights in Slovakia
- Recognition of same-sex unions in Europe
