= Recognition of same-sex unions in Armenia =

Armenia does not recognize same-sex marriage or civil unions. However, the legal status of foreign same-sex marriages is unclear. On 3 July 2017, the Ministry of Justice reportedly stated that all marriages performed abroad are valid in Armenia, including marriages between people of the same sex. Article 143 of the Family Code states that Armenia recognizes foreign marriages as long as they conform with the legality of the jurisdiction where they were performed and contains no explicit prohibition on same-sex marriages. On the other hand, article 152 restricts the application of foreign law incompatible with the domestic public order. As of 2026, there are no known instances of a foreign same-sex marriage being registered in Armenia. In 2019, Minister of Justice Rustam Badasyan said that the government does not recognize same-sex marriages.

Following a 2015 referendum, the Constitution of Armenia has generally been interpreted to limit marriage to opposite-sex couples.

== Legal history ==
=== Background ===
Same-sex marriage (Armenian: Նույնասեռ ամուսնություն, nuynaseṛ amusnutʿyun, pronounced [nujnɑˈsɛr, -sɛɾ ɑmusnuˈtʰjun, -tʰʏn]) is not legal in Armenia and there is little public debate surrounding the issue. The Government of Armenia has close ties with the Armenian Apostolic Church, which opposes same-sex marriage. In August 2019, the Minister of Justice, Rustam Badasyan, said that Armenia does not recognize same-sex marriages. Civil unions, which would offer some of the rights and benefits of marriage, are also not recognized. However, as a member of the Council of Europe, Armenia is obliged under the European Court of Human Rights' ruling in Fedotova and Others v. Russia to provide legal recognition to same-sex unions. Article 8 of the European Convention on Human Rights, which guarantees a right to private and family life, imposes a positive obligation on all member states of the Council of Europe to establish a legal framework recognising same-sex unions. The ECHR has also issued similar rulings with respect to Romania in Buhuceanu and Others, Ukraine in Maymulakhin and Markiv, Bulgaria in Koilova and Babulkova, and Poland in Przybyszewska and Others.

=== Restrictions ===
Laws regarding same-sex partnerships in Europe¹ Marriage Civil union Limited domestic recognition (cohabitation) Unrecognized Constitution limits marriage to opposite-sex couples ¹ May include recent laws or court decisions that have not yet entered into effect.

Article 10 of the Family Code (Ընտանեկան Օրենսգիրք, Ěntanekan Ōrensgirkʿ), adopted in 2004, states that marriage requires "the mutual voluntary consent of a man and a woman". Article 11, which lists several outlawed marriages (including bigamy, marriages between close relatives and marriages between adopters and adopted), does not contain explicit prohibitions on marriages between people of the same sex. On 18 October 2017, Deputy Tigran Urikhanyan of the Prosperous Armenia party proposed a bill to introduce an explicit ban on same-sex marriages in the Family Code. On 15 November 2018, the Armenian Government expressed its opposition to the bill, stating that the Family Code already prohibits the recognition of same-sex marriages. "Armenia's Constitution already defines that marriage is possible only between woman and man. Besides, according to Family Code marriage is possible in case of reciprocal consent of a man and a woman and in case they are 18 years old [sic]", said Arsen Manukyan, the Deputy Minister of Labor and Social Affairs. The National Assembly rejected the bill in November 2019, labelling it "redundant", while also rejecting a bill which would have explicitly banned adoption by same-sex couples.

Article 35 of the Constitution of Armenia was amended in a referendum in 2015 to read:

A woman and a man having attained the marriageable age shall have the right to marry and form a family with free expression of their will. The marriageable age and the procedure for marriage and divorce shall be prescribed by law.

It further states that "a woman and a man are entitled to equal rights as to marriage, during marriage and at its dissolution." However, it also states that "freedom to marry may be restricted only by law with the aim of protecting health and morals." While the constitutional wording has been interpreted as banning same-sex marriage, members of the Venice Commission, when analyzing the draft constitution, said that the wording "should not be interpreted as a legal obstacle to the recognition of same-sex marriages". Argam Stepanyan, the head of the Civil Status Acts Registration Agency, a division of the Ministry of Justice, later said in an interview that there is no constitutional prohibition on same-sex marriage in Armenia. Human rights activists have said that the wording "notes" the right of a man and a woman to marry, but does not explicitly state that marriage is between a man and a woman.

=== Recognition of marriages performed abroad ===
On 3 July 2017, the Ministry of Justice reportedly stated that all marriages performed abroad are valid in Armenia, including marriages between people of the same sex. According to the Family Code, marriages between Armenian citizens and those between Armenian citizens and foreigners or stateless persons, which have been registered outside Armenia, are valid inside the country after consular legalization. The code makes no reference to the sexes of the married spouses and stipulates that marriages registered in another country, which are in line with that particular state's legislation, are valid in Armenia as long as they are also compliant with the Armenian public order. As of 2026, the Statistical Committee of Armenia has not documented a single case of recognition of a foreign same-sex marriage. It is not known if recognition would give such couples all the rights of marriage under domestic law.

== Religious performance ==
The Armenian Apostolic Church, the national church, is vociferously opposed to homosexuality and same-sex marriage. In 2006, a same-sex couple celebrated an informal wedding ceremony at the Etchmiadzin Cathedral in Vagharshapat. An article published about this improvised marriage in the "168 Zham" (168 Hours) newspaper provoked a scandal and indignation of local conservative media outlets, politicians and religious officials.

In December 2017, Father Vazken Movsesian, serving in the Diocese of the West, based in California, expressed his personal support for same-sex marriage, becoming one of the most high-profile supporters of same-sex marriage in the Church.

== Public opinion ==
A 2017 poll from the Pew Research Center showed that 91% of Armenians favored the Apostolic Church's position of not performing same-sex marriages, while 4% disagreed.

== See also ==
- Human rights in Armenia
- LGBT rights in Armenia
- Pink Armenia
- Recognition of same-sex unions in Europe
- Recognition of same-sex unions in Asia
- Right Side NGO
