= Recognition of same-sex unions in Europe =

Laws regarding same-sex partnerships in Europe¹ Marriage Civil union Limited domestic recognition (cohabitation) Unrecognized Constitution limits marriage to opposite-sex couples ¹ May include recent laws or court decisions that have not yet entered into effect.

Countries performing civil unions in Europe Gender-neutral civil unions Civil unions for same-sex couples only Former civil unions for same-sex couples, replaced by marriage Civil unions never performed

Debate has occurred throughout Europe over proposals to legalise same-sex marriage as well as same-sex civil unions. Currently 33 of the 50 countries and the 8 dependent territories in Europe recognise some type of same-sex union, among them most members of the European Union (23/27). Nearly 43% of the European population lives in jurisdictions where same-sex marriage is legal.

As of January 2025, 22 European countries legally recognise and perform same-sex marriages: Andorra, Austria, Belgium, Denmark, Estonia, Finland, France, Germany, Greece, Iceland, Ireland, Liechtenstein, Luxembourg, Malta, the Netherlands, Norway, Portugal, Slovenia, Spain, Sweden, Switzerland, and the United Kingdom. An additional ten European countries legally recognise some form of civil union, namely Croatia, Cyprus, the Czech Republic, Hungary, Italy, Latvia, Lithuania, Monaco, Montenegro, and San Marino.

Although they do not recognise same-sex unions themselves, Bulgaria, Poland, Romania, and Slovakia are bound by a ruling by the European Court of Justice to recognise same-sex marriages performed within the EU and including an EU citizen for the purposes of granting legal residence, though this ruling is not always respected in practice, as in the case of Romania and Bulgaria which have not implemented the ruling. In December 2023, the European Court of Human Rights ruled that by failing to legalise same-sex unions, Poland had violated the right to respect for private and family life. On 25 November 2025, the ECJ ruled that member states must recognise same-sex marriages lawfully concluded in another member state, even though they are not obliged to legalise same-sex marriage domestically. In Poland, the ECJ ruling led to the domestic recognition of same-sex marriages performed in other EU countries. As of 25 September 2026, same-sex couples who married abroad and then successfully transcribed their marriage certificate at a registrar office in Poland are treated equally as opposite-sex marriages for the purposes of public healthcare access, social security benefits and taxation.

Of the countries that perform same-sex marriages, some still allow civil unions, e.g. the Benelux nations, France and the United Kingdom, (Note: Excluding Guernsey and Overseas Territories (except Gibraltar).) whereas Denmark, Finland, Germany, Iceland, Ireland, Liechtenstein, Norway, Slovenia, Sweden and Switzerland have ended their pre-marriage civil union legislation so that existing unions remain but new ones are not possible.

Several European countries do not recognise any same-sex unions. Marriage is defined as a union solely between a man and a woman in the constitutions of Armenia, Belarus, Bulgaria, Croatia, Georgia, Hungary, Latvia, Lithuania, Moldova, Montenegro, Russia, Serbia, Slovakia and Ukraine. Of these, however, Croatia, Hungary, Latvia, Montenegro and Lithuania allow civil unions for same-sex couples.

== Current situation ==
=== International level ===
==== European Court of Human Rights ====
Over the years, the European Court of Human Rights (ECtHR) has handled cases that challenged the lack of legal recognition of same-sex couples in certain member states. The Court has held that the European Convention on Human Rights (ECHR) requires member states to provide legal recognition, but does not require marriage to be opened to same-sex couples.

In Schalk and Kopf v Austria (24 June 2010), the European Court of Human Rights decided that the European Convention on Human Rights does not oblige member states to legislate for or legally recognise same-sex marriages. However, the Court, for the first time, accepted same-sex relationships as a form of "family life".

In Vallianatos and Others v Greece (7 November 2013), the Court held that exclusion of same-sex couples from registering a civil union, a legal form of partnership available to opposite-sex couples, violates the convention. Greece had enacted a law in 2008 that established civil unions for opposite-sex couples only. A 2015 law extended partnership rights to same-sex couples.

Oliari and Others v Italy (21 July 2015) went further and established a positive obligation upon member states to provide legal recognition for same-sex couples. Italy thus breached the convention; it eventually implemented civil unions in 2016. The decision set a precedent for potential future cases regarding the 23 member states, certain British and Dutch territories, and the states with limited recognition (excluding Kosovo), that currently do not recognise same-sex couples' right to family life.

Chapin and Charpentier v France (9 June 2016) largely confirmed Schalk and Kopf v. Austria, holding that denying a same-sex couple access to marriage does not violate the convention. At the time of the judgment, France did allow same-sex marriage, however, the case originated from 2004 (regarding the validity of a same-sex marriage officiated by Noël Mamère), when only pacte civil de solidarité (PACS) was available to same-sex couples in France.

Fedotova and Others v. Russia (17 January 2023) ruled that states are obliged to recognize same-sex unions or civil unions. Other similar cases from other countries, including Poland, are awaiting the Tribunal. The ECHR informed the Polish government that it had accepted complaints about the lack of access for same-sex couples to marriage or civil partnerships in Poland (2020).

In a judgment issued on 12 December 2023 in the case of Przybyszewska and Others v. Poland (applications nos. 11454/17 and 9 others), the European Court of Human Rights ruled that by failing to legalise same-sex unions, Poland had violated the right to respect for private and family life (Article 8 of the European Convention on Human Rights). The Court found that the Polish State had failed to ensure a legal framework providing for the recognition and protection of their same-sex unions, preventing the applicants from formalising fundamental aspects of their lives, which amounted to a breach of their right to respect for their private and family life. In response, Polish prime minister Donald Tusk launched a legislative proposal for a form of registered partnership in October 2025.

==== European Union ====
Some debate occurred within the European Union about how to require member states to recognise same-sex marriages conducted in other member states, as well as any European citizens' civil unions or registered partnerships, so as to ensure the right of freedom of movement for citizens' family members.

In 2010, Romanian LGBTQ activist Adrian Coman and his American partner, Robert Claibourn Hamilton, married in Belgium, and subsequently attempted to relocate to Romania. Romanian authorities refused to recognise their marriage and the case progressed to the European Court of Justice. On 11 January 2018, the ECJ's advocate general, Melchior Wathelet, issued an official legal opinion stating that an EU member country cannot refuse residency rights to the same-sex spouse of an EU citizen on the grounds that it does not recognise same-sex marriage.

On 5 June 2018, the ECJ ruled in Coman's favour, stating the term "spouse" was gender-neutral, and member states are therefore obliged to recognise EU residency rights for partners of EU citizens. However, the court confirmed that it will still be up to member states whether to legalise same-sex marriage.

According to research from the European Parliament, some EU states still do not in practice grant residency to same-sex spouses, as required by the June 2018 ECJ ruling in Coman v. Romania. As of September 2021, Hamilton himself has not been granted residency by the Romanian government, despite the ruling. In September 2021, the European Parliament passed a resolution condemning some states failure to implement the ruling, and calling on the European Commission to ensure rights of same-sex spouses are upheld.

On 25 November 2025, the ECJ ruled in Cupriak-Trojan and Trojan v Wojewoda Mazowiecki that member states must recognise same-sex marriages lawfully concluded in another member state. The judges noted that their decision does not oblige member states to amend their domestic legislation to recognise same-sex marriage, only to recognise marriages lawfully concluded in another EU country "without distinction or additional hurdles". The ECJ's prior ruling in Coman was not implemented by Romania, Poland, Slovakia, Hungary, Bulgaria, or the Czech Republic.

=== National level ===
Status	Country	Since	Country population (Last Census count)
Marriage (22 countries) * In ten countries that have passed marriage, other types of partnerships are available too.	Andorra*	2023 (Note: Stable union of a couple (Catalan: unió estable de parella) since 2005; civil union (Catalan: unió civil) from 2014 until 2023.)	84,652
Marriage (22 countries) * In ten countries that have passed marriage, other types of partnerships are available too.	Austria*	2019 (Note: Registered partnership (German: eingetragene Partnerschaft) since 2010.)	9,344,058
Marriage (22 countries) * In ten countries that have passed marriage, other types of partnerships are available too.	Belgium*	2003 (Note: Statutory cohabitation (Dutch: wettelijke samenwoning; French: cohabitation légale; German: gesetzliches Zusammenwohnen) since 2000; also de-facto cohabitation (Dutch: feitelijke samenwoning; French: cohabitation de fait; German: faktisches Zusammenwohnen) gives some rights to non-married couples.)	11,943,255
Marriage (22 countries) * In ten countries that have passed marriage, other types of partnerships are available too.	Denmark	2012 (Note: Registered partnership (Danish: registreret partnerskab) from 1989 until 2012.)	6,095,221
Marriage (22 countries) * In ten countries that have passed marriage, other types of partnerships are available too.	Estonia*	2024 (Note: Registered partnership (Estonian: kooseluleping) since 2016.)	1,423,402
Marriage (22 countries) * In ten countries that have passed marriage, other types of partnerships are available too.	Finland	2017 (Note: Registered partnership (Finnish: rekisteröity parisuhde; Swedish: registrerat partnerskap) from 2001 until 2017.)	5,704,452
Marriage (22 countries) * In ten countries that have passed marriage, other types of partnerships are available too.	France*	2013 (Note: Civil solidarity pact (French: pacte civil de solidarité) since 1999.)	66,957,990
Marriage (22 countries) * In ten countries that have passed marriage, other types of partnerships are available too.	Germany	2017 (Note: Registered life partnership (German: eingetragene Lebenspartnerschaft) from 2001 until 2017.)	86,043,771
Marriage (22 countries) * In ten countries that have passed marriage, other types of partnerships are available too.	Greece*	2024 (Note: Cohabitation agreement (Greek: σύμφωνο συμβίωσης) since 2015.)	9,718,615
Marriage (22 countries) * In ten countries that have passed marriage, other types of partnerships are available too.	Iceland*	2010 (Note: Registered partnership (Icelandic: staðfest samvist) from 1996 until 2010; consensual cohabitation (Icelandic: óvígð sambúð) since 2006.)	411,534
Marriage (22 countries) * In ten countries that have passed marriage, other types of partnerships are available too.	(Republic of Ireland) Ireland	2015 (Note: Civil partnership (Irish: páirtnéireacht shibhialta) from 2010 until 2015.)	5,483,784
Marriage (22 countries) * In ten countries that have passed marriage, other types of partnerships are available too.	Liechtenstein	2025 (Note: Registered partnership (German: eingetragene Partnerschaft) from 2011 until 2024.)	40,511
Marriage (22 countries) * In ten countries that have passed marriage, other types of partnerships are available too.	Luxembourg*	2015 (Note: Partnership (Luxembourgish and German: Partnerschaft; French: partenariat) since 2004.)	704,258
Marriage (22 countries) * In ten countries that have passed marriage, other types of partnerships are available too.	Malta*	2017 (Note: Civil union (Maltese: unjoni ċivili) since 2014 and cohabitation (Maltese: koabitazzjoni) since 2017.)	548,491
Marriage (22 countries) * In ten countries that have passed marriage, other types of partnerships are available too.	Netherlands*	2001 (Note: Registered partnership (Dutch: geregistreerd partnerschap) since 1998; also cohabitation (Dutch: samenwonen) gives some rights to non-married couples.)	18,707,836
Marriage (22 countries) * In ten countries that have passed marriage, other types of partnerships are available too.	Norway	2009 (Note: Registered partnership (Norwegian: registrert partnerskap; Northern Sami: registrerejuvvon párragaskavuohta) from 1993 until 2008.)	5,720,213
Marriage (22 countries) * In ten countries that have passed marriage, other types of partnerships are available too.	Portugal	2010 (Note: De-facto union (Portuguese: união de facto) since 2001.)	10,474,587
Marriage (22 countries) * In ten countries that have passed marriage, other types of partnerships are available too.	Slovenia	2022 (Note: Partnership (Slovene: partnerska skupnost) between 2006 and 2017; Expanded partnership (Slovene: partnerska zveza) from 2017 until 2023.)	2,128,566
Marriage (22 countries) * In ten countries that have passed marriage, other types of partnerships are available too.	Spain*	2005 (Note: De-facto couple (Spanish: pareja de hecho; Basque: izatezko bikote; Galician: parella de feito), stable couple (Spanish: pareja estable; Catalan: parella estable; Basque: bikote egonkorra) or de-facto union (Spanish: unión de hecho; Catalan: unió de fet) available in each autonomous community, legalized between 1998 and 2018. Since 1994, limited rights for cohabiting couples.)	48,178,783
Marriage (22 countries) * In ten countries that have passed marriage, other types of partnerships are available too.	Sweden	2009 (Note: Registered partnership (Swedish: registrerat partnerskap) from 1994 until 2009.)	10,759,442
Marriage (22 countries) * In ten countries that have passed marriage, other types of partnerships are available too.	Switzerland	2022 (Note: Registered partnership (German: eingetragene Partnerschaft; French: partenariat enregistré; Italian: unione domestica registrata; Romansh: partenadi registrà) from 2004 until 2022.)	9,126,100
Marriage (22 countries) * In ten countries that have passed marriage, other types of partnerships are available too.	United Kingdom*	2020 (Note: Civil partnership (Welsh: partneriaeth sifil) since 2004; same-sex marriage in England, Scotland, and Wales since 2014 and in Northern Ireland since 2020.)	70,319,770
Subtotal	—	—	369,149,934 (42.6% of the European population)
Civil unions (10 countries) * In three of the countries that have passed civil unions, another type of partnership is available too.	Croatia	2014 (Note: Unregistered cohabitation between 2003 and 2014; Life partnership (Croatian: životno partnerstvo) since 2014.)	3,861,018
Civil unions (10 countries) * In three of the countries that have passed civil unions, another type of partnership is available too.	Cyprus (Note: Excluding the disputed region of Northern Cyprus.)	2015	951,730 (Note: Excluding the disputed region of Northern Cyprus.)
Civil unions (10 countries) * In three of the countries that have passed civil unions, another type of partnership is available too.	Czech Republic*	2006 (Note: Unregistered cohabitation since 2001 and registered partnership (Czech: registrované partnerství) since 2006. Limited rights for a "close person" (osoba blízká) since 1964.)	11,258,368
Civil unions (10 countries) * In three of the countries that have passed civil unions, another type of partnership is available too.	Hungary*	2009 (Note: Unregistered cohabitation (Hungarian: élettársi kapcsolat) and registered partnership (Hungarian: bejegyzett élettársi kapcsolat) since 2009.)	8,848,372
Civil unions (10 countries) * In three of the countries that have passed civil unions, another type of partnership is available too.	Italy*	2016 (Note: Civil union (Italian: unione civile) and cohabitation contract (Italian: contratto di convivenza) since 2016.)	59,118,146
Civil unions (10 countries) * In three of the countries that have passed civil unions, another type of partnership is available too.	Latvia	2024 (Note: Legalised by judicial decision in 2022. Partnership (Latvian: partnerība) since 2024.)	1,886,668
Civil unions (10 countries) * In three of the countries that have passed civil unions, another type of partnership is available too.	Lithuania	2025 (Note: Legalised by judicial decision in 2025.)	2,976,405
Civil unions (10 countries) * In three of the countries that have passed civil unions, another type of partnership is available too.	Monaco	2020	39,036
Civil unions (10 countries) * In three of the countries that have passed civil unions, another type of partnership is available too.	Montenegro	2021	698,041
Civil unions (10 countries) * In three of the countries that have passed civil unions, another type of partnership is available too.	San Marino	2019 (Note: Limited residency rights for foreign spouses since 2012.)	32,616
Subtotal	—	—	85,954,565 (10.0% of the European population)
Total - Countries with some form of recognition of same-sex unions	—	—	460,023,633 (54.1% of the European population)
No recognition (8 countries) + As part of the European Union, is legally bound to provide residency rights to foreign same-sex spouses of EU citizens in compliance with case C-673/16 of the European Court of Justice.	Albania	—	2,761,208
No recognition (8 countries) + As part of the European Union, is legally bound to provide residency rights to foreign same-sex spouses of EU citizens in compliance with case C-673/16 of the European Court of Justice.	Azerbaijan	—	10,391,840
No recognition (8 countries) + As part of the European Union, is legally bound to provide residency rights to foreign same-sex spouses of EU citizens in compliance with case C-673/16 of the European Court of Justice.	Bosnia and Herzegovina	—	3,122,753
No recognition (8 countries) + As part of the European Union, is legally bound to provide residency rights to foreign same-sex spouses of EU citizens in compliance with case C-673/16 of the European Court of Justice.	Kazakhstan	—	21,305,294
No recognition (8 countries) + As part of the European Union, is legally bound to provide residency rights to foreign same-sex spouses of EU citizens in compliance with case C-673/16 of the European Court of Justice.	North Macedonia	—	1,805,081
No recognition (8 countries) + As part of the European Union, is legally bound to provide residency rights to foreign same-sex spouses of EU citizens in compliance with case C-673/16 of the European Court of Justice.	Romania +	—	18,964,758
No recognition (8 countries) + As part of the European Union, is legally bound to provide residency rights to foreign same-sex spouses of EU citizens in compliance with case C-673/16 of the European Court of Justice.	Turkey	—	87,952,467
No recognition (8 countries) + As part of the European Union, is legally bound to provide residency rights to foreign same-sex spouses of EU citizens in compliance with case C-673/16 of the European Court of Justice.	Vatican City	—	825
Subtotal	—	—	144,420,748 (16.7% of the European population)
Constitutional ban on marriage (14 countries) + As part of the European Union, is legally bound to provide residency rights to foreign same-sex spouses of EU citizens in compliance with case C-673/16 of the European Court of Justice. * Other types of partnerships are available.	Armenia	2015 (Note: While Armenia's Constitutional Court has never confirmed that the Constitution of Armenia actually bans same-sex marriage, following the 2015 constitutional referendum article 35 now states that "A woman and a man having attained the marriageable age shall have the right to marry and form a family with free expression of their will." (in Armenian: Ամուսնական տարիքի հասած կինը և տղամարդը միմյանց հետ իրենց կամքի ազատ արտահայտությամբ ամուսնանալու և ընտանիք կազմելու իրավունք ունեն). The article 143 of the Family Code recognizes foreign marriages as long as they conform with the legality of the territory where they were celebrated. Article 152, however, limits the application of foreign family law norms that contradict the internal public order, thus making the registration of same-sex marriages performed overseas possibly incompatible with Armenian law.)	3,152,717
Constitutional ban on marriage (14 countries) + As part of the European Union, is legally bound to provide residency rights to foreign same-sex spouses of EU citizens in compliance with case C-673/16 of the European Court of Justice. * Other types of partnerships are available.	Belarus	1994	8,933,913
Constitutional ban on marriage (14 countries) + As part of the European Union, is legally bound to provide residency rights to foreign same-sex spouses of EU citizens in compliance with case C-673/16 of the European Court of Justice. * Other types of partnerships are available.	Bulgaria +	1991	6,700,495
Constitutional ban on marriage (14 countries) + As part of the European Union, is legally bound to provide residency rights to foreign same-sex spouses of EU citizens in compliance with case C-673/16 of the European Court of Justice. * Other types of partnerships are available.	Croatia +*	2013	3,861,018
Constitutional ban on marriage (14 countries) + As part of the European Union, is legally bound to provide residency rights to foreign same-sex spouses of EU citizens in compliance with case C-673/16 of the European Court of Justice. * Other types of partnerships are available.	(Georgia (country)) Georgia	2018	3,848,444
Constitutional ban on marriage (14 countries) + As part of the European Union, is legally bound to provide residency rights to foreign same-sex spouses of EU citizens in compliance with case C-673/16 of the European Court of Justice. * Other types of partnerships are available.	Hungary +*	2012	8,848,372
Constitutional ban on marriage (14 countries) + As part of the European Union, is legally bound to provide residency rights to foreign same-sex spouses of EU citizens in compliance with case C-673/16 of the European Court of Justice. * Other types of partnerships are available.	Latvia +*	2006	1,886,668
Constitutional ban on marriage (14 countries) + As part of the European Union, is legally bound to provide residency rights to foreign same-sex spouses of EU citizens in compliance with case C-673/16 of the European Court of Justice. * Other types of partnerships are available.	Lithuania +*	1992	2,976,405
Constitutional ban on marriage (14 countries) + As part of the European Union, is legally bound to provide residency rights to foreign same-sex spouses of EU citizens in compliance with case C-673/16 of the European Court of Justice. * Other types of partnerships are available.	Moldova	1994	3,155,374
Constitutional ban on marriage (14 countries) + As part of the European Union, is legally bound to provide residency rights to foreign same-sex spouses of EU citizens in compliance with case C-673/16 of the European Court of Justice. * Other types of partnerships are available.	Montenegro *	2007	698,041
Constitutional ban on marriage (14 countries) + As part of the European Union, is legally bound to provide residency rights to foreign same-sex spouses of EU citizens in compliance with case C-673/16 of the European Court of Justice. * Other types of partnerships are available.	Poland +	1997	39,994,656
Constitutional ban on marriage (14 countries) + As part of the European Union, is legally bound to provide residency rights to foreign same-sex spouses of EU citizens in compliance with case C-673/16 of the European Court of Justice. * Other types of partnerships are available.	Russia	2020	144,995,320
Constitutional ban on marriage (14 countries) + As part of the European Union, is legally bound to provide residency rights to foreign same-sex spouses of EU citizens in compliance with case C-673/16 of the European Court of Justice. * Other types of partnerships are available.	Serbia	2006	6,715,883
Constitutional ban on marriage (14 countries) + As part of the European Union, is legally bound to provide residency rights to foreign same-sex spouses of EU citizens in compliance with case C-673/16 of the European Court of Justice. * Other types of partnerships are available.	Slovakia +*	2014	5,664,086
Constitutional ban on marriage (14 countries) + As part of the European Union, is legally bound to provide residency rights to foreign same-sex spouses of EU citizens in compliance with case C-673/16 of the European Court of Justice. * Other types of partnerships are available.	Ukraine	1996	28,817,834
Subtotal	—	—	242,620,086 (28.0% of the European population)
Total - Countries with no recognition of same-sex unions	—	—	359,727,469 (41.5% of the European population)

=== Partially-recognised and unrecognised states ===
Status	Country	Since	State population (Last estimate count)
No recognition (5 states)	Abkhazia	—	243,564
No recognition (5 states)	Kosovo	—	1,907,592
No recognition (5 states)	Northern Cyprus	—	313,626
No recognition (5 states)	South Ossetia	—	51,547
No recognition (5 states)	Transnistria	—	475,665
Total			2,991,994 (0.3% of the European population)

=== Sub-national level ===
Status	Country	Jurisdiction	Legal since	Jurisdiction population (Last Census count)
Marriage (8 jurisdictions) * Other types of partnerships are available too.	Denmark	Faroe Islands	2017	49,198
Marriage (8 jurisdictions) * Other types of partnerships are available too.	Denmark	Greenland	2016	56,081
Marriage (8 jurisdictions) * Other types of partnerships are available too.	United Kingdom	Akrotiri and Dhekelia	2014	15,700
Marriage (8 jurisdictions) * Other types of partnerships are available too.	United Kingdom	Alderney	2018	2,020
Marriage (8 jurisdictions) * Other types of partnerships are available too.	United Kingdom	Gibraltar*	2016	32,194
Marriage (8 jurisdictions) * Other types of partnerships are available too.	United Kingdom	Guernsey	2017	62,948
Marriage (8 jurisdictions) * Other types of partnerships are available too.	United Kingdom	Isle of Man*	2016	84,497
Marriage (8 jurisdictions) * Other types of partnerships are available too.	United Kingdom	Jersey*	2018	100,080
Marriage (8 jurisdictions) * Other types of partnerships are available too.	United Kingdom	Sark	2020	600
Total				403,318 (0.0% of the European population)
Total for all European jurisdictions				865,880,853 (100% of the European population)

== Future legislation ==
=== Non-marital partnership ===
==== Government proposals or proposals with a parliamentary majority ====
Kosovo: On 25 April 2024, Prime Minister Albin Kurti announced his government's intention to legalize same-sex unions.

Poland: On 27 December 2023, Poland's new Prime Minister, Donald Tusk, announced that a bill to legalise same-sex unions would be introduced and debated in the Sejm in 2024. On 9 July 2024, a bill allowing both opposite-sex and same-sex couples to form "closest person status contracts" was added to the Polish government's agenda. On 29 May 2026, the Sejm passed the "Act on the Status of the Closest Person in a Relationship" (Polish: Ustawa o statusie osoby najbliższej w związku). Under the proposed bill, two adults would be able to sign a notarized agreement granting them limited cohabitation rights, including shared property arrangements, maintenance obligations, joint property and tax settlements, and access to their partner's medical information. Katarzyna Kotula, the government’s minister for equality, welcomed the vote, calling the bill "the first law in [Poland's] history that gives the possibility of recognizing same-sex unions." The legislation now moves to the upper-house Senate before heading to President Karol Nawrocki, who is aligned with the conservative opposition. On 27 May, Paweł Szefernaker, the head of Nawrocki's cabinet stated: "There is not and will not be consent from the president for the introduction or legalisation of civil partnerships". Speaking just ahead of the Sejm vote, Nawrocki himself confirmed this stance, stating: "I am the guardian of the Constitution that states explicitly that marriage is a union between a man and a woman." However, the president added that he would be willing to sign limited cohabitation rights, provided they do not mirror the legal framework of civil partnerships.

Ukraine: On 12 July 2022, a petition on same-sex marriage reached 28,000 signatures (above the 25,000 signatures needed to trigger a debate in parliament). President Volodymyr Zelenskyy stated on 2 August 2022 that while a change of the constitution, which defines marriage as union of a man and a woman, is not allowed as long as martial law is in place, he endorses the introduction of civil unions and asked his government to evaluate legal options. As of 26 May 2023, the Ukrainian Parliamentary Judicial Committee is considering Bill № 9103, which would introduce civil partnerships in Ukraine. In August 2024, the Committee on National Health, Medical Assistance and Medical Insurance recommended the bill for adoption in its first reading. On 22 January 2026, a draft of a revised Civil Code was submitted to the Parliament of Ukraine by Speaker Ruslan Stefanchuk and a large group of lawmakers, intended to "harmonize Ukrainian family law with European Union standards". It introduces amendments that define a family as the cohabitation of a man and a woman and includes a provision to automatically annul marriages if one spouse undergoes legal sex reassignment. The Parliament Speaker has described the proposal as "modern and European". If adopted, the new Civil Code would explicitly exclude same-sex partnerships.

==== Legal rulings ====
Lithuania: In April 2025, Lithuania's Constitutional Court ruled that Article 3.229 of the Civil Code, which permits partnerships exclusively between a man and a woman, was unconstitutional, and mandated the Lithuanian Parliament to legislate to recognize civil partnerships for same-sex couples. In its ruling, the Constitutional Court also opened a legal pathway for same-sex couples to register civil partnerships through the courts, even in the absence of specific legislation.

Poland: Poland has not implemented the contracting or recognition of same-sex unions, although it is obliged to do so by judgments of the European Court of Human Rights:

- Andersen v. Poland (2025) concerning the registration of a foreign marriage certificate and the practical hardships of non-recognition (such as the necessity of seeking judicial protection for ordinary needs, existing in a legal limbo, and the forced adjustment of behaviour to secure alternative legal recognition) impacting a non-resident of Poland,
- Formela v. Poland (2024) regarding the state's obligation to ensure that the applicants have a specific legal framework providing for the recognition and protection of their unions,
- Przybyszewska and Others v. Poland (2023) regarding the recognition of civil partnerships in Poland, similar to Oliari v. Italy and Fedotova v. Russia, but concerning Poland,
- Szypuła and Others v. Poland (2025) in connection with the refusal to issue certificates to the applicants stating the absence of circumstances excluding the conclusion of marriage abroad (certificate of no impediment).

The ECHR also issued a decision in 2025 in the case of Gruszczyński-Ręgowski and Others v. Poland, in which the Tribunal decided to strike the applications out of the list of cases pursuant to Art. 37 § 1 of the Convention due to unilateral declarations by the Government acknowledging a violation of Art. 8 of the Convention and a declaration to pay the applicants Barabasz and Kowalska the amount of 2,000 euros as reimbursement of costs.. In a judgment of November 25, 2025, the CJEU ruled, also citing judgments of the European Court of Human Rights, that "a Member State is obliged to recognize a marriage of two citizens of the Union of the same sex legally concluded in another Member State, in which they exercised their freedom of movement and residence". The judgment is based on the case Coman v General Inspectorate for Immigration of the Ministry of Internal Affairs [Romania], which was decided in 2018.

Romania: In May 2023, the European Court of Human Rights ordered the government to legalize same-sex civil partnerships, in order to protect the rights of same-sex couples to a family life, as protected under the Charter. However, as of September 2026, the government has refused to comply with the ruling.

== Public opinion ==
According to a Eurobarometer poll in 2023, public support for same-sex marriage in EU member states was highest in Sweden (94%), the Netherlands (94%), Denmark (93%), Spain (88%), Ireland (86%), Luxembourg (84%), Germany (84%), Portugal (81%), Belgium (79%), and France (79%).

According to a Eurobarometer poll in 2015, public support for same-sex marriage in EU member states was highest in the Netherlands (91%), Sweden (90%), Denmark (87%), Spain (84%), Ireland (80%), Belgium (77%), Luxembourg (75%), the United Kingdom (71%) and France (71%). Between 2006 and 2015, support rose most significantly in Malta, from 18% to 65%, and in Ireland, from 41% to 80%.

After the approval of same-sex marriage in Portugal in January 2010, 52% of the Portuguese population stated that they were in favor of the legislation. In 2008, 58% of the Norwegian voters supported same-sex marriage, which was introduced in the same year, and 31 percent were against it. In January 2013, 54.1% of Italians respondents supported same-sex marriage. In a late January 2013 survey, 77.2% of Italians respondents supported the recognition of same-sex unions. According to an Ipsos poll published in 2021, 83% of Italians were in favour of legal recognition for same-sex couples, 10% stated they were against and 7% did not have a specific position on the issue. 59% of surveyed Italians stated they were in favour of same-sex couples jointly adopting children, while 36% were opposed.

In Greece, support more than tripled between 2006 and 2017. In 2006, 15% of Greeks said that they agreed with same-sex marriage being allowed throughout Europe, rising to 50.04% by 2017. A survey in 2020 indicated that 56% of the Greek population accept same-sex marriage.

In Ireland, a 2008 survey revealed 84% of people supported civil unions for same-sex couples (and 58% for same-sex marriage), while a 2010 survey showed 67% supported same-sex marriage by 2012 this figure had risen to 73% in support. On 22 May 2015, 62.1% of the electorate voted to enshrine same-sex marriage in the Irish constitution as equal to heterosexual marriage.

In Croatia, a poll conducted in November 2013 revealed that 59% of Croats think that marriage should be constitutionally defined as a union between a man and a woman, while 31% do not agree with the idea. In Poland, support for same sex marriages has increased from 17% in 2006 to 45% in 2019, according to Eurobarometer; other polls show a majority supporting registered partnerships.

In the European Union, support tends to be the lowest in Bulgaria, Latvia, Hungary, Romania, Slovakia, and Lithuania. The average percentage of support for same-sex marriage in the European Union as of 2006 when it had 25 members was 44%, which had descended from a previous percentage of 53%. The change was caused by more socially conservative nations joining the EU. In 2015, with 28 members, average support was at 61%.

=== Opinion polls ===
Indicates the country/territory has legalised same-sex marriage nationwide
Indicates that same-sex marriage is legal in certain parts of the country
Indicates that the country has civil unions or registered partnerships
Indicates that the country has pending civil union or registered partnership legislation
Indicates that the country has pending same-sex marriage legislation

Country	Pollster	Year	For (Note: Because some polls do not report 'neither', those that do are listed with simple yes/no percentages in parentheses, so their figures can be compared.)	Against	Neither (Note: Comprises: Neutral; Don't know; No answer; Other; Refused.)	Margin of error	Source
Albania	IPSOS	2023	26%	73% (74%)	1%		
Andorra	Institut d'Estudis Andorrans	2013	70% (79%)	19% (21%)	11%		
Armenia	Pew Research Center	2015	3% (3%)	96% (97%)	1%	±3%	
Austria	Eurobarometer	2023	65%	30%	5%		
Belarus	Pew Research Center	2015	16% (16%)	81% (84%)	3%	±4%	
Belgium	Ipsos	2024	69%	19% [9% support some rights]	12% not sure	±5%	
Belgium	Eurobarometer	2023	79%	19%	2% not sure		
Bosnia and Herzegovina	IPSOS	2023	26% (27%)	71% (73%)	3%		
Bulgaria	Eurobarometer	2023	17%	75%	8%		
Croatia	Eurobarometer	2023	42%	51%	7%		
Cyprus	Eurobarometer	2023	50%	44%	6%		
Czech Republic	Eurobarometer	2023	60%	34%	6%		
Denmark	Eurobarometer	2023	93%	5%	2%		
Estonia	Eurobarometer	2023	41%	51%	8%		
Finland	Eurobarometer	2023	76%	18%	6%		
France	Ipsos	2024	62%	26% [16% support some rights]	12% not sure	±3.5%	
France	Pew Research Center	2023	82%	14%	4%	±3.6%	
France	Eurobarometer	2023	79%	14	7%		
(Georgia (country)) Georgia	Women's Initiatives Supporting Group	2021	10% (12%)	75% (88%)	15%		
Germany	Ipsos	2024	73%	18% [10% support some rights]	12% not sure	±3.5%	
Germany	Pew Research Center	2023	80%	19%	1%	±3.6%	
Germany	Eurobarometer	2023	84%	13%	3%		
Greece	Pew Research Center	2023	48% (49%)	49% (51%)	3%	±3.6%	
Greece	Eurobarometer	2023	57% (59%)	40% (41%)	3%		
Hungary	Medián	2026	68%	30%	2%		
Hungary	Ipsos	2024	44%	35% [18% support some rights]	21% not sure	±5%	
Hungary	Pew Research Center	2023	31% (33%)	64% (67%)	5%	±3.6%	
Hungary	Eurobarometer	2023	42%	52%	6%		
Iceland	Gallup	2006	89%	11%	–		
(Republic of Ireland) Ireland	Ipsos	2024	68%	21% [8% support some rights]	10%	±5% (Note: [+ more urban/educated than representative])	
(Republic of Ireland) Ireland	Eurobarometer	2023	86%	9%	5%		
Italy	Ipsos	2024	58%	29% [19% support some rights]	12% not sure	±3.5%	
Italy	Pew Research Center	2023	73% (75%)	25%	2%	±3.6%	
Italy	Eurobarometer	2023	69%	27%	4%		
Kazakhstan	Pew Research Center	2016	7% (7%)	89% (93%)	4%		
Kosovo	IPSOS	2023	20% (21%)	77% (79%)	3%		
Latvia	Eurobarometer	2023	36%	59%	5%		
Liechtenstein	Liechtenstein Institut	2021	72%	28%	0%		
Lithuania	Eurobarometer	2023	39%	55%	6%		
Luxembourg	Eurobarometer	2023	84%	13%	3%		
Malta	Eurobarometer	2023	74%	24%	2%		
Moldova	Europa Liberă Moldova	2022	14%	86%			
Montenegro	IPSOS	2023	36% (37%)	61% (63%)	3%		
Netherlands	Ipsos	2024	77%	15% [8% support some rights]	8% not sure	±5%	
Netherlands	Pew Research Center	2023	89% (90%)	10%	1%	±3.6%	
Netherlands	Eurobarometer	2023	94%	5%	2%		
North Macedonia	IPSOS	2023	20% (21%)	78% (80%)	2%		
Norway	Pew Research Center	2017	72% (79%)	19% (21%)	9%		
Poland	Ipsos	2024	39%	48% [28% support some rights]	13%	±5%	
Poland	Pew Research Center	2023	41% (43%)	54% (57%)	5%	±3.6%	
Poland	United Surveys by IBRiS	2024	50% (55%)	41% (45%)	9%		
Poland	Eurobarometer	2023	50%	45%	5%		
Portugal	Ipsos	2023	80% (84%)	15% [11% support some rights] (16%)	5%		
Portugal	Eurobarometer	2023	81%	14%	5%		
Romania	Ipsos	2023	25% (30%)	59% [26% support some rights] (70%)	17%	±3.5%	
Romania	Eurobarometer	2023	25%	69%	6%		
Russia	Ipsos	2021	17% (21%)	64% [12% support some rights] (79%)	20% not sure	±4.8%	
Russia	FOM	2019	7% (8%)	85% (92%)	8%	±3.6%	
Serbia	IPSOS	2023	24% (25%)	73% (75%)	3%		
Slovakia	Focus	2024	36% (38%)	60% (62%)	4%		
Slovakia	Eurobarometer	2023	37%	56%	7%		
Slovenia	Eurobarometer	2023	62% (64%)	37% (36%)	2%		
Spain	Ipsos	2024	73%	19% [13% support some rights]	9% not sure	±3.5%	
Spain	Pew Research Center	2023	87% (90%)	10%	3%	±3.6%	
Spain	Eurobarometer	2023	88%	9%	3%		
Sweden	Ipsos	2024	78%	15% [8% support some rights]	7% not sure	±5%	
Sweden	Pew Research Center	2023	92% (94%)	6%	2%	±3.6%	
Sweden	Eurobarometer	2023	94%	5%	1%		
Switzerland	Ipsos	2023	54% (61%)	34% [16% support some rights] (39%)	13% not sure	±3.5%	
Turkey	Ipsos	2024	18%	52% [19% support some rights]	30% not sure	±5%	
Ukraine	Kyiv International Institute of Sociology	2023	44% (55%)	36% (45%)	20%	±2.2%	
Ukraine	Rating	2023	37% (47%)	42% (53%)	22%	±1.5%	
United Kingdom	YouGov	2023	77% (84%)	15% (16%)	8%		
United Kingdom	Ipsos	2024	66%	24% [11% support some rights]	10% not sure	±3.5%	
United Kingdom	Pew Research Center	2023	74% (77%)	22% (23%)	4%	±3.6%	

Opinion polls for same-sex marriage by dependent territory
Country	Pollster	Year	For	Against	Neutral	Source
Faroe Islands	Spyr.fo	2019	71.1%	12.6%	16.7%	
Gibraltar	Inter-Ministerial Committee Consultation	2015	63%	37%	0%	
Northern Ireland	YouGov	2019	55%	-	-	

== See also ==
- LGBTQ rights in Europe
- LGBTQ rights in the European Union
- LGBTQ adoption in Europe
- Recognition of same-sex unions in Africa
- Recognition of same-sex unions in the Americas
- Recognition of same-sex unions in Asia
- Recognition of same-sex unions in Oceania
