= Recognition of same-sex unions in Hungary =

Hungary has recognized registered partnerships since 1 July 2009, offering same-sex couples nearly all of the rights and benefits of marriage. Legislation to recognise registered partnerships passed the National Assembly by a 199–159 vote on 20 April 2009. It was signed by President László Sólyom, and took effect on 1 July. In addition, unregistered cohabitation for same-sex couples was recognised and placed on equal footing with the cohabitation of different-sex couples in 1996.

Same-sex marriage is prohibited by the Constitution of Hungary, which came into effect in January 2012. Polling suggests that a majority of Hungarians support the legal recognition of same-sex marriage.

== Unregistered cohabitation ==
Unregistered cohabitation (élettársi kapcsolat) occurs when a same-sex or opposite-sex couple cohabits but chooses to keep the legal status of their relationship unregistered or informal. Cohabitation law applies to couples living together in an economic and sexual relationship, including opposite-sex and same-sex couples. No official registration is required. Hungarian law gives some specified rights and benefits to two persons living together. These rights include hospital visitation and access to medical information, prison visitation rights for the partner of an incarcerated person, right to make decisions about the deceased partner's funeral, right to declare a same-sex partner as a next of kin, widow's pension, and immigration rights, among others. Some of these benefits require an official statement from the social department of the local government that proves that the partners are indeed cohabiting. The couple can record a contract (élettársi vagyonjogi szerződés) to settle property relations between each other.

== Registered partnerships ==
=== Legislative action ===
In 2007, the Gyurcsány Government, comprising the Alliance of Free Democrats (SZDSZ) and the Hungarian Socialist Party (MSZP), submitted a bill to the National Assembly to establish registered partnerships for both same-sex and opposite-sex couples. Parliament adopted the bill on 17 December 2007. This act would have provided all of the rights of marriage to registered partners except for the ability to adopt and to take a common surname. The registered partnership act would have entered into force on 1 January 2009, but on 15 December 2008 the Hungarian Constitutional Court declared it unconstitutional on the grounds that it duplicated the institution of marriage for opposite-sex couples. The court found that a registered partnership law that only applied to same-sex couples would be constitutional; indeed, it opined that the Parliament had a duty to introduce such a law. Prime Minister Ferenc Gyurcsány instructed the Minister of Justice, Tibor Draskovics, to draft a new, revised bill that would conform to the court's decision.

On 23 December 2008, the government announced that it would introduce a new registered partnership bill in line with the Constitutional Court's decision. The legislation would offer same-sex couples all of the rights offered by the previous act, and would be presented to Parliament as early as February 2009. On 12 February 2009, the government approved the new bill, and it was adopted 199–159 with 8 abstentions by the National Assembly on 20 April 2009. Those voting in favour were members of the ruling Socialist and Alliance of Free Democrats parties, while those opposing were members of Fidesz, the Christian Democratic People's Party and 6 independents. The 8 lawmakers who abstained were all independents. The new registered partnership act was signed by President László Sólyom, and took effect on 1 July 2009. On 23 March 2010, the Constitutional Court ruled that the law was constitutional.

Registered partnerships (Hungarian: bejegyzett élettársi kapcsolat, pronounced [ˈbɛ.jɛɟzɛtː ˈeːlɛtːaːrʃi ˈkɒptʃolɒt]) are only open to same-sex couples. Registered partners are entitled to the same inheritance and property rights, widow's pension, tax benefits, social benefits, and immigration and naturalization rights as married spouses. Partners are also entitled to receive information about the health of their partner and make medical decisions if the partner cannot do so themselves (e.g. accident), are treated as next-of-kin in criminal law, and are protected from domestic violence. Unlike married spouses, registered partners cannot take a common surname, adopt or participate in artificial insemination. In February 2018, the Budapest District Court ruled that Hungary must recognize same-sex marriages performed abroad as registered partnerships. This was upheld by the Constitutional Court in June 2025, which ordered the Parliament to pass legislation allowing same-sex marriages validly contracted abroad to be recognised as registered partnerships. This ruling was expanded on on 25 November 2025, when the European Court of Justice (ECJ) ruled in a legal case involving a dual Polish-German couple who had married in Germany but sought recognition of their marriage in Poland, Jakub Cupriak-Trojan and Mateusz Trojan v Wojewoda Mazowiecki, that member states of the European Union must recognise each other's same-sex marriages.

=== Statistics ===
By the end of 2025, 1,776 partnerships had been performed in Hungary.

Number of partnerships registered in Hungary
	2009	2010	2011	2012	2013	2014	2015	2016	2017	2018	2019	2020	2021	2022	2023	2024	2025	Total
Female	49	61	24	32	21	30	36	50	49	44	43	44	64	53	64	65	93	822
Male	18	19	21	9	9	12	29	34	38	86	66	80	76	98	113	115	141	964
Total	67	80	45	41	30	42	65	84	87	130	109	124	140	151	167	180	234	1,776

== Same-sex marriage ==
Laws regarding same-sex partnerships in Europe¹ Marriage Civil union Limited domestic recognition (cohabitation) Unrecognized Constitution limits marriage to opposite-sex couples ¹ May include recent laws or court decisions that have not yet entered into effect.

=== Background and constitutional ban ===
In September 2007, the liberal Alliance of Free Democrats, part of the governing coalition since the 2002 elections, presented a draft same-sex marriage bill to the Parliament's Human Rights Committee. This would have defined marriage as the union of "two persons" over the age of 18 irrespective of gender. On 6 November 2007, the committee rejected the bill without debate. Opponents of the bill pointed to a Constitutional Court ruling a few months earlier that had defined the institution of marriage as a bond "between a man and a woman".

On 1 January 2012, a new constitution enacted by the government of Viktor Orbán, leader of the ruling Fidesz party, came into effect, restricting marriage to opposite-sex couples and containing no guarantees of protection from discrimination on account of sexual orientation. Article L reads: "Hungary shall protect the institution of marriage as the union of a man and a woman established by voluntary decision, and the family as the basis of the nation's survival." (Note: Hungarian: Magyarország védi a házasság intézményét mint férfi és nő között, önkéntes elhatározás alapján létrejött életközösséget, valamint a családot mint a nemzet fennmaradásának alapját. A családi kapcsolat alapja a házasság, illetve a szülőgyermek viszony.) On 29 June 2015, Deputy Gábor Fodor from the Liberal Party introduced a constitutional amendment to define marriage as "a union of two people" and a bill to make appropriate changes in statutory law. Both measures were rejected by the Parliament's Justice Committee on 26 October 2015.

In June 2026, activists called for the legalization of same-sex marriage at Budapest Pride. Prime Minister Péter Magyar said at the time that his government had no position on the matter, but was "open to discuss[ing]" it. The Mayor of Budapest, Gergely Karácsony, expressed his personal support for same-sex marriage and called for the constitutional ban to be repealed. Opinion polls also showed that a majority of the population was open to legalization.

=== Religious performance ===
The Catholic Church opposes same-sex marriage and does not allow its priests to officiate at such marriages. In December 2023, the Holy See published Fiducia supplicans, a declaration allowing Catholic priests to bless couples who are not considered to be married according to church teaching, including the blessing of same-sex couples. The Hungarian Catholic Bishops' Conference released a statement on 27 December stressing that the "declaration does not change Church teaching on marriage and sexual morality", adding that "considering the pastoral situation of our country, the bishops' conference formulates as a guideline for pastors that we can bless all people individually, regardless of their gender identity and sexual orientation, but we should always avoid giving a common blessing to couples who live together in a purely conjugal relationship, in a non-ecclesially valid marriage or in a same-sex relationship."

The Reformed Church of Hungary considers marriage "the lifelong alliance between a man and a woman, as the good order of creation of God", and does not allow its clergy to bless same-sex unions. The Evangelical-Lutheran Church in Hungary also does not permit its clergy to bless same-sex unions.

== Public opinion ==
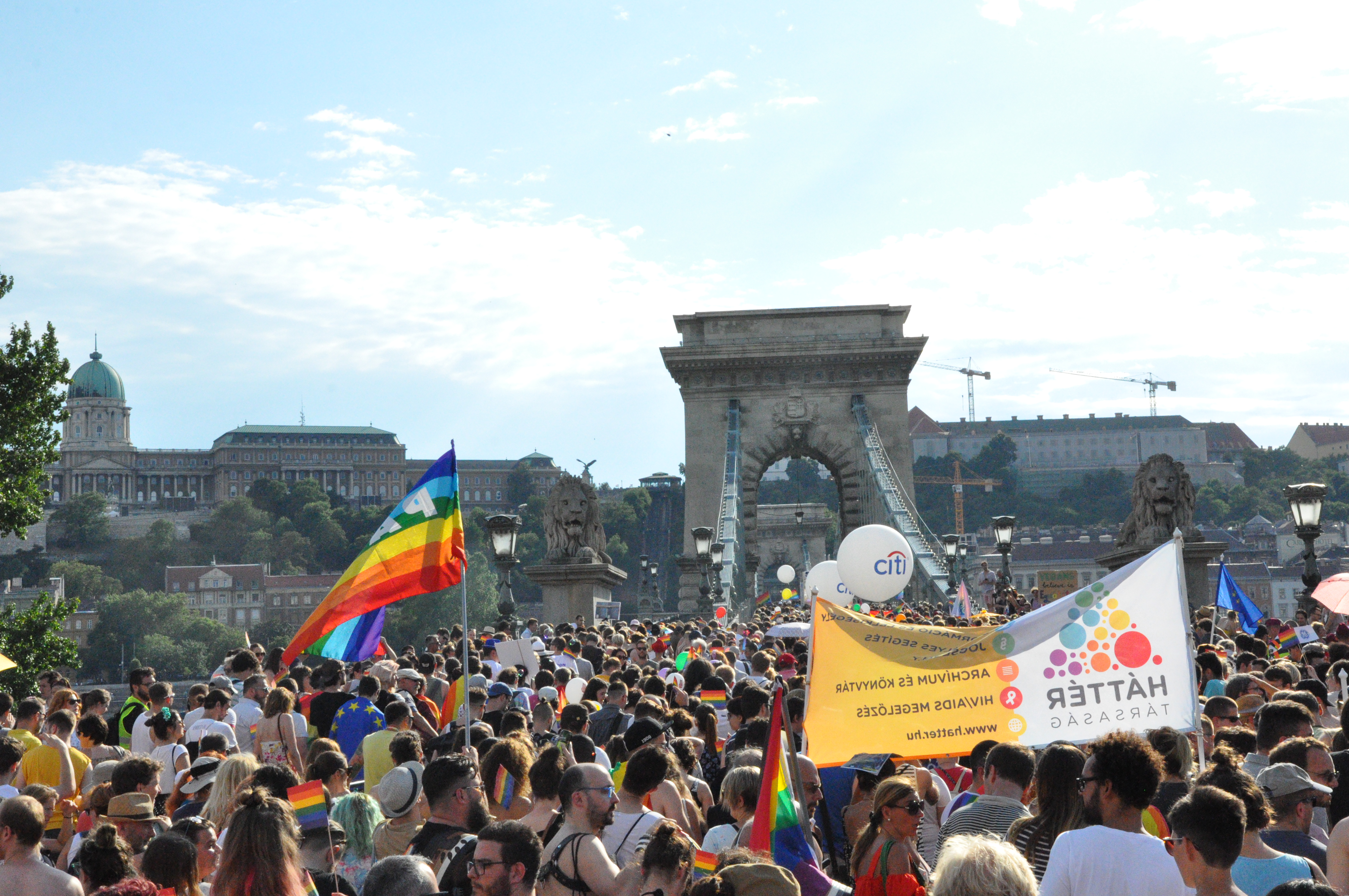
Háttér Society sign at Budapest Pride in 2017, where participants marched for LGBT rights and equal marriage rights

Several opinion polls have been conducted to gauge the attitudes of Hungarians on the issue of same-sex marriage and registered partnerships. A Eurobarometer survey released in December 2006 found that 18% of Hungarians believed same-sex marriages should be allowed throughout Europe. A poll conducted by Medián in July 2007 showed that 30% of respondents considered it "acceptable" for same-sex couples to get married, and a poll by Market Research & Public Opinion Polling (MASMI) published in December 2007 showed that 35% of Hungarians were in favour of allowing same-sex couples to marry. A poll by Szonda Ipsos in September 2009 found that the majority of Hungarians, 58%, supported the newly introduced registered partnership law for same-sex couples. A May 2013 Ipsos poll found that 30% of respondents were in favour of same-sex marriage and another 21% supported other forms of recognition for same-sex couples. The 2015 Eurobarometer found that 39% of Hungarians thought same-sex marriage should be allowed throughout Europe, while 53% were opposed.

A 2016 opinion poll conducted by Budapest Pride and Integrity Lab found that 36% of Hungarians were in favour of same-sex marriage, while 56% were opposed and 7% were undecided (21% "strongly" supported, 15% "somewhat" supported, 15% "somewhat" opposed and 41% "strongly" opposed). The poll also found that 60% of the population agreed that lesbian, gay and bisexual people should have the same rights as heterosexual people, and 46% supported adoption rights for same-sex couples with 47% opposed. Support for same-sex marriage was higher among women (40%) than men (33%), highest among university graduates (43%), and highest among people who personally knew a gay person (46%). Opposition was mainly concentrated among religious people, with 75% of regular church attendees opposing same-sex marriage, decreasing based on the level of church attendance, and among voters of the ruling Fidesz party (71%). Among irreligious people, support and opposition both stood at 47%. Despite a majority of Hungarians opposing same-sex marriage, the poll found that 60% disagreed with the belief that same-sex marriage poses a threat to Hungarian values and 66% were of the opinion that "same-sex couples want to get married as a show of their mutual love and devotion".

A poll by Pew Research Center published in May 2017 found that 27% of Hungarians were in favor of same-sex marriage, while 64% opposed it. Support was highest among non-religious people (34%) and 18–34 year olds (39%), but lowest among Catholics (25%) and people aged 35 and over (23%). The 2019 Eurobarometer found that 33% of Hungarians thought same-sex marriage should be allowed throughout Europe, while 61% were opposed.

A May 2021 Ipsos poll showed that 46% of Hungarians supported same-sex marriage, 20% supported partnerships but not marriage, while 18% were opposed to all legal recognition for same-sex couples, and 17% were undecided. A GLOBSEC survey conducted in March 2023 showed that 56% of Hungarians supported same-sex marriage, while 37% were opposed. This was the first time a poll had found majority support for same-sex marriage in Hungary. A Pew Research Center poll conducted between February and May 2023 showed that 31% of Hungarians supported same-sex marriage, 64% were opposed and 5% did not know or had refused to answer. When divided by political affiliation, support was highest among those on the left of the political spectrum at 50%, followed by those at the center at 33% and those on the right at 25%.

A 2023 Ipsos poll showed that 47% of Hungarians supported same-sex marriage, while 20% supported civil unions or other types of partnerships but not marriage, 18% were undecided and 16% were opposed to all recognition for same-sex couples. The 2023 Eurobarometer found that 42% of respondents thought same-sex marriage should be allowed throughout Europe, while 52% were opposed. The survey also found that 49% of Hungarians thought that "there is nothing wrong in a sexual relationship between two persons of the same sex", while 46% disagreed. A 2026 Medián poll showed that 68% of Hungarians supported same-sex marriage and adoption rights.

== See also ==
- LGBT rights in Hungary
- Recognition of same-sex unions in Europe
