= Sarajevo Open Centre =

Bosnian LGBTQ and feminist advocacy organization

Sarajevo Open Centre (Serbo-Croatian: Sarajevski otvoreni centar), abbreviated SOC, is an independent feminist civil society organisation and advocacy group which campaigns for lesbian, gay, bisexual, trans and intersex (LGBTI) people and women's rights in Bosnia and Herzegovina. The organization also gives asylum and psychological support to victims of discrimination and violence.

The SOC's Pink Report is an annual report on the state of the human rights of LGBTI people in the country and is supported by the Norwegian Embassy in the country. The most recent Pink Report was published by the Sarajevo Open Centre in 2023. These types of reports document issues such as incidents of discrimination, hate crimes, and violations of human rights against women and members of the LGBTI community in Bosnia and Herzegovina. They also include suggestions for measures that can be taken to address these issues and protect the individuals moving forward, such as the 2021-2024 Action Plan to Improve the State of Human Rights and Fundamental Freedoms of LGBTI People. This plan aims to promote equality and diversity by advocating for LGBTI rights such as, but not limited to, legal regulations of same-sex partnerships and social inclusion of transgender individuals in Bosnia and Herzegovina. Through the documentation of such topics in these reports, the Sarajevo Open Centre (SOC) advocates for the rights and protection of members of the LGBTI community who have been subjected to prejudice, discrimination, and injustice.

== Publications ==
- Spahić and Gavrić, Aida and Saša (2012). Čitanka LGBT ljudskih prava, 2. dopunjeno izdanje (PDF) (in Serbo-Croatian). Sarajevo: Sarajevski otvoreni centar/Heinrich Böll Foundation. ISBN 978-9958-577-02-4.
- Miftari, Edita (2015). Gavrić, Saša; Bošnjak, Emina (eds.). Human Rights do not Recognize Political Ideology! Political Parties and the Human Rights of Lesbian, Gay, Bisexual and Transgender People (PDF). Human Rights Series. Vol. 34. Sarajevski otvoreni centar. 57. ISBN 978-9958-536-25-0.
