= Recognition of same-sex unions in Montenegro =

Montenegro has recognised same-sex life partnerships since 15 July 2020. On 1 July, the Parliament of Montenegro passed a bill by 42 votes to 5 to recognise life partnerships offering several, but not all, of the rights and benefits of marriage. The bill was signed into law on 3 July by President Milo Đukanović, took effect on 15 July 2020 and became fully operational one year later. The first life partnership was registered on 25 July 2021.

Montenegro was the third country of former Yugoslavia, after Slovenia and Croatia, to recognise same-sex unions.

== Life partnerships ==
Laws regarding same-sex partnerships in Europe¹ Marriage Civil union Limited domestic recognition (cohabitation) Unrecognized Constitution limits marriage to opposite-sex couples ¹ May include recent laws or court decisions that have not yet entered into effect.

=== Legislative action ===
On 13 November 2012, Deputy Prime Minister Duško Marković said that the government would prepare a bill granting some form of legal recognition to same-sex couples. The Ministry of Justice and Human and Minority Rights drafted a bill to legalise registered partnerships conferring some of the rights, benefits and responsibilities of marriage, but excluding adoption or fostering rights. The Serbian Orthodox Church and the Democratic Front expressed opposition to the proposal, claiming it would "wreck Christian values and family life in Montenegro". On 27 December 2018, the government expressed its support for the draft bill. If enacted, it would have taken effect one year later. The bill was lodged in the Parliament of Montenegro on 24 January 2019, and on 27 February it was backed by the Parliamentary Committee on Human Rights. However, it was blocked by parliamentarians, led by the Democratic Front, in a 38–4 vote with 39 abstentions on 31 July. The necessary majority of 41 votes was not achieved. The Democratic Party of Socialists, the Social Democrats and the Liberal Party supported the measure.

On 12 December 2019, the government approved a second, similar draft. It was introduced to the Parliament on 14 January 2020. On 18 June 2020, the legislation was backed by the Parliamentary Committee on Human Rights, and approved by the Parliament in a 42–5 vote on 1 July. The bill was supported by the Democratic Party of Socialists, the Social Democrats, the Social Democratic Party (except for one deputy), the Liberal Party and one deputy from DEMOS, but opposed by the opposition (which did not vote), as well as three parties representing ethnic minority communities (Croats, Bosniaks, and Albanians). The bill was signed into law on 3 July by President Milo Đukanović, and was published on 7 July 2020 in the Official Gazette of Montenegro. It entered into force on 15 July 2020, and became applicable year later, on 15 July 2021.

1 July 2020 vote in the Parliament
Party	Voted for	Voted against	Abstained	Absent (Did not vote)
G Democratic Party of Socialists	35: Aleksandra Vuković; Ana Nikolić; Andrija Nikolić; Bogdan Fatić; Branimir Gvozdenović; Branka Tanasijević; Branko Čavor; Daliborka Pejović; Danijel Živković; Dragutin Papović; Filip Vuković; Halil Duković; Jovanka Laličić; Luiđ Škrelja; Maja Bakrač; Marija Maja Ćatović; Marta Šćepanović; Mihailo Anđušić; Milorad Vuletić; Miloš Nikolić; Miodrag Vuković; Mirsad Murić; Momčilo Martinović; Nada Drobnjak; Nada Nenezić; Nela Savković Vukčević; Nikola Divanović; Nikola Rakočević; Petar Ivanović; Predrag Sekulić; Radule Novović; Sanja Pavićević; Suad Numanović; Zvonko Vuković; Žana Filipović	–	–	–
Democratic Front	–	–	–	18: Aleksandra Vujičić; Andrija Mandić; Branka Bošnjak; Branko Radulović; Budimir Aleksić; Jovan Jole Vučurović; Koča Pavlović; Ljiljana Đurašković; Marina Jočić; Milan Knežević; Milun Zogović; Milutin Đukanović; Nebojša Medojević; Predrag Bulatović; Slaven Radunović; Strahinja Bulajić; Veljko Vasiljević; Vera Bulatović
Democratic Montenegro	–	–	–	8: Aleksa Bečić; Boris Bogdanović; Danilo Šarančić; Dženan Kolić; Momo Koprivica; Valentina Minić; Vladimir Čađenović; Zdenka Popović
For the Benefit of All	–	–	–	6: Aleksandar Damjanović; Anka Vukićević; Danijela Pavićević; Goran Danilović; Goran Radonjić; Srđan Milić
Social Democratic Party	3: Draginja Vuksanović; Ranko Krivokapić; Raško Konjević	1: Džavid Šabović	–	–
G Social Democrats	2: Boris Mugoša; Ivan Brajović	–	–	–
DEMOS	1: Neđeljko Rudović	–	–	1: Miodrag Lekić
G Bosniak Party	–	2: Ervin Ibrahimović; Nedžad Drešević	–	–
G Croatian Civic Initiative	–	1: Adrijan Vuksanović	–	–
Liberal Party	1: Andrija Popović	–	–	–
G New Democratic Force	–	1: Genci Nimanbegu	–	–
United Reform Action	–	–	–	1: Dritan Abazović
Total	42	5	0	34
Total	51.9%	6.2%	0.0%	42.0%

Prime Minister Duško Marković welcomed the law's passage, tweeting that it was "a great step in the right direction for Montenegrin society, its democratic maturity and integration processes. Equality and same rights for all are the cornerstone of human and European values. I want to thank the LGBTIQ community for dialogue and contribution. There can be no room for discrimination based on sexual orientation in a European Montenegro." The legislation established life partnerships (Montenegrin: životno partnerstvo, pronounced [ʒǐvotno pârtnerstvo]) (Note: In Montenegro's recognized minority languages: Albanian: partneriteti jetësor, pronounced [paɾtnɛɾiˈtɛti jɛtəˈsɔɾ]; Bosnian: životno partnerstvo, животно партнерство, pronounced [ʒǐvotno pârtnerstvo]; Croatian: životno partnerstvo, pronounced [ʒǐvotno pârtnerstvo]; Serbian: животно партнерство, životno partnerstvo, pronounced [ʒǐvotno pârtnerstvo]) for same-sex couples, guaranteeing many legal rights and obligations, including inheritance, guardianship, property ownership, hospital and prison visitation rights and domestic violence protections, among others. While not granting full adoption rights, the law allows a life partner to make emergency decisions regarding their partner's biological child, and grants them the same rights as married couples with regard to disputes over the protection of their child's rights. Although the law became operational on 15 July 2021, a deadlock in Parliament following Justice Minister Vladimir Leposavić's dismissal from office on 17 June, as well as a lack of adequate documentation by local registrars, caused a delay for same-sex couples to register. The first partnership was conducted in the town of Budva between two women on 25 July 2021. Minister of Public Administration Tamara Srzentić congratulated the couple.

In June 2022, an LGBT advocacy group, LGBT Forum Progress, filed a lawsuit in Podgorica challenging the government's refusal to recognise same-sex partnerships performed abroad.

=== Statistics ===
Between July 2021 and July 2022, 22 same-sex life partnerships were performed in Montenegro, a majority between Russian citizens. 18 of these partnerships were registered in Budva. By November 2023, 75 partnerships had been performed in Montenegro, mostly in Budva, Podgorica, Herceg Novi and Bar.

== Same-sex marriage ==
The Constitution of Montenegro was ratified in 2007, one year after independence. Article 71 of the Constitution reads as follows: "Marriage may be entered into only on the basis of a free consent of a woman and a man. Marriage shall be based on equality of spouses." (Note: Montenegrin: Brak se može zaključiti samo uz slobodan pristanak žene i muškarca. Brak se zasniva na ravnopravnosti supružnika.) The wording has been interpreted as banning same-sex marriage.

== Public opinion ==
A December 2022 Ipsos survey showed that 36% of Montenegrins considered same-sex marriage "acceptable" (18% "completely" and 18% "mainly"), while 61% considered it "unacceptable" (45% "completely" and 16% "mainly"). This represented a large increase of support from 2015 when 9% of Montenegrins supported same-sex marriage. With regard to specific rights, 68% of respondents supported the right of same-sex couples to receive survivor pension benefits in case of the partner's death.

== See also ==
- LGBT rights in Montenegro
- Recognition of same-sex unions in Europe
