= Recognition of same-sex unions in Romania =

Romania does not recognise same-sex marriage or civil unions. Registered partnerships have been debated several times since 2008, though no bill on the matter has successfully passed the Parliament of Romania. In May 2023, the European Court of Human Rights (ECHR) ruled that Romania was violating the European Convention on Human Rights by not recognizing same-sex unions. The government appealed the decision to the Grand Chamber in August 2023, but this appeal was rejected on 25 September 2023. The ECHR imposed a positive obligation on the government to establish a legal framework recognising same-sex unions. It may risk financial sanctions from the Council of Europe if it fails to change the law.

In June 2018, the European Court of Justice (ECJ) ruled that same-sex spouses of European Union citizens should be granted a right of residency in Romania. The ECJ expanded on this ruling on 22 November 2025 when it ruled in Jakub Cupriak-Trojan and Mateusz Trojan v Wojewoda Mazowiecki, a Polish case, that all member states of the European Union must recognise same-sex marriages validly performed within the European Union. The Constitution of Romania does not define marriage directly, but Article 48 of the Constitution defines marriages between "spouses" as the foundation of the family.

== Unregistered cohabitation ==
In June 2019, the Chamber of Deputies voted in favour of amending patient rights legislation, allowing patients to designate any person over 18 years of age as their "legal representative" through a statutory declaration. This allows a person in a same-sex relationships to visit their partner in hospital and to make medical decisions on their behalf. The initiator of the law specifically referred to the fact that about 10% of Romanian couples at the time were unmarried as one of the reasons for the reform. The law was promulgated by President Klaus Iohannis on 24 July and came into effect on 28 July 2019. While the law does not specifically mention same-sex couples, it provides a mechanism for same-sex couples to obtain equal visitation and medical decision-making rights to different-sex married couples, by appointing themselves as a "legal representative" (reprezentant legal) through a public notary.

== Registered partnerships ==
=== Summary ===
Registered partnerships (Romanian: parteneriat înregistrat, pronounced [parteˈnerjat ɨnreˈdʒistrat]) (Note: Hungarian: bejegyzett élettársi kapcsolat, pronounced [ˈbɛ.jɛɟzɛtː ˈeːlɛtːaːrʃi ˈkɒptʃolɒt]; Romani: registrime partnerimo; Transylvania Saxon: liewenspartnerscheft) are not available in Romania, despite several previous unsuccessful attempts to change the law. The first bill to recognise registered partnerships was introduced in 2008. In 2023, the European Court of Human Rights imposed a positive obligation on the government to establish a legal framework recognising same-sex unions, otherwise risking financial sanctions from the Council of Europe.

=== Early bills ===
The primary LGBT advocacy group in Romania is ACCEPT, which advocates for partnership rights and same-sex marriage. The organisation launched a campaign to legalise same-sex registered partnerships in Romania during Bucharest Pride in 2006, which lasted from 30 May to 4 June, and was organised under the theme "Same-sex marriage and civil unions in Romania". This event provoked widespread debate over the issue in the media. ACCEPT activists organised a public debate and seminar on same-sex partnerships on 31 May 2006, and called on the Government of Romania to legalise same-sex marriage or registered partnerships, offering its assistance in drafting a legislative proposal. Romaniţa Iordache, the executive director of ACCEPT, said on 31 May 2006 that "Article 200 [the last anti-gay law] has been abrogated, but we [the LGBT community] still do not have equal rights, even though the Constitution guarantees this." A spokesman for ACCEPT, Florin Buhuceanu, claimed that "guaranteeing the equality of rights through the recognition of gay marriage... is just a step forward."

On 23 February 2008, Péter Eckstein-Kovács, a parliamentarian from the Democratic Union of Hungarians in Romania, proposed a bill to legalise registered partnerships, providing unmarried same-sex and opposite-sex couples a number of legal rights and benefits. He said that the current Family Code was "adopted more than fifty years ago and no longer reflected social realities, both in the case of homosexuals and heterosexuals". This marked the first time in Romania that a politician had explicitly supported registered partnerships for same-sex couples. The bill failed to pass. Eckstein-Kovács re-introduced a partnership bill on 23 July 2008. However, that bill died in the Senate following the 2008 election. Another registered partnership bill was introduced by Viorel Arion from the Democratic Liberal Party in February 2011. It would have provided same-sex and opposite-sex couples with some of the rights of marriage, and received a favourable recommendation from the Legislative Committee of the Chamber of Deputies. However, the bill was opposed by the government, and ultimately failed to pass.

In April 2013, MP Remus Cernea from the Green Party announced he would introduce a bill to grant same-sex couples the same rights as opposite-sex couples, prompting fierce reactions from opponents of the move. Among the most vehement reactions was from Senator Puiu Hașotti, who described homosexuals as "sick people" and "not natural", prompting a formal complaint by ACCEPT to the National Council for Combating Discrimination. On 4 July 2013, Cernea introduced the bill to the Senate. A few months later, the Romanian Government issued a statement confirming it would not support the bill, and on 17 December 2013 it was rejected by the Senate by 2 votes to 110. On 13 March 2014, a judicial committee unanimously advised the Parliament to reject the proposal. On 11 June 2014, the bill was rejected by the Chamber of Deputies with 298 votes opposed to the bill, 4 in favor and 5 abstentions. On 31 March 2015, another civil union bill was rejected by the Senate with 49 votes against the bill, 8 in favor and 3 abstentions.

=== Reform attempts in 2018–2019 ===
In April 2018, Liviu Dragnea, the President of the Chamber of Deputies, expressed his support for registered partnerships. On 9 October 2018, just days after the failed referendum to constitutionally ban same-sex marriage, the Minister for European Affairs, Victor Negrescu, said that a bill allowing registered partnerships had been finalized and would be introduced in mid-October. However, in mid-October 2018, media outlets reported that the introduction of the bill had been postponed, and that the ruling Social Democratic Party (PSD) and Dragnea himself were no longer supportive. On 29 October, the Senate rejected a partnership bill introduced by Independent MP Oana Bîzgan. On 31 October, a group of 42 deputies from different parties submitted another bill to the Chamber of Deputies.

Two separate civil union bills were rejected by the Senate in March 2019. One bill would have recognised same-sex and opposite-sex couples "for the purpose of setting up a shared private life and household", while the other bill would have granted shared rights for couples entering a partnership and covered aspects such as succession rights, protection from domestic violence, the obligation to support an incapacitated partner, and fiscal facilities or social benefits granted by the state.

=== Buhuceanu ruling and aftermath ===
On 23 May 2023, the European Court of Human Rights (ECHR) ruled in Buhuceanu and Others v. Romania that the government had violated the human rights of 21 same-sex couples by refusing to recognise their relationships. The lead plaintiff was Florin Buhuceanu, the former executive director of ACCEPT. The couples had sued in 2019 and 2020 for being "deprived of their dignity as spouses", and cited disadvantages, such as being barred from spousal bereavement leave, mortgage programmes or joint health insurance. The ECHR ruled that Article 8 of the European Convention on Human Rights obliges the government to recognise same-sex unions. The government was given three months to appeal the decision, but if the appeal was rejected, Romania would be obliged to pass legislation recognising same-sex unions, otherwise risking sanctions from the Council of Europe. Reacting to the decision, President Klaus Iohannis said the topic was "a complicated issue for Romania". Members of the Orthodox Church and the Alliance for the Union of Romanians called for the decision to be "ignored", which is legally impossible. The government announced its intention to appeal the decision in August 2023. According to Csaba Ferenc Asztalos, such an appeal was unlikely to succeed, as the ECHR had already ruled in the case of Fedotova and Others v. Russia in January 2023 on the same issue being appealed by the government. The ECHR later also issued similar rulings with respect to Ukraine in Maymulakhin and Markiv, Bulgaria in Koilova and Babulkova and Poland in Przybyszewska and Others. If the appeal was rejected, the decision would become mandatory for all 46 members of the Council of Europe.

The appeal was rejected by the Grand Chamber of the European Court of Human Rights on 25 September 2023, making Buhuceanu final and definitive. If the government fails to change the law and the Council of Europe launches infringement procedures, the financial sanctions faced by Romania could amount to between €1,830 and €109,800 for each day of delay (9,102 RON to 546,145 RON), as well as a minimum lump sum of €1,708,000 (8,495,592 RON). Lucian Romașcanu, a spokesman for the ruling Social Democratic Party, said in a statement that "the European Court's final ruling on the protection and legal recognition of LGBT families in Romania must be thoroughly analysed by the government and explained to society. Romania is committed to fulfilling its obligations as an EU member state", but also said there were "significant cultural differences" between Romania and the rest of the European Union. In November 2023, when asked whether the government intended to enforce the ruling, Prime Minister Marcel Ciolacu issued a statement that "Romanian society is not ready for a decision at the moment. It is not one of my priorities and… I don't think Romania is ready." The situation remained unchanged in November 2024; Buhuceanu said, "This issue cannot be separated from what's going on with the democracy status of Romania. It's inconceivable to have final judgments that are not respected immediately."

== Same-sex marriage ==
Laws regarding same-sex partnerships in Europe¹ Marriage Civil union Limited domestic recognition (cohabitation) Unrecognized Constitution limits marriage to opposite-sex couples ¹ May include recent laws or court decisions that have not yet entered into effect.

=== Background ===
While running for president in 2004, Traian Băsescu said that he saw "nothing wrong" with same-sex marriage. The opposition Social Democratic Party used his comments to campaign against him during the election. Băsescu served as president from 2004 to 2014. On 13 February 2008, the Senate voted in favour of an amendment to the Civil Code of Romania, proposed by the Greater Romania Party, to explicitly define marriage as being only "between a man and a woman". Previously, the law had only used the words "between spouses". The amendment was approved with 38 votes for, 10 votes against and 19 senators abstaining. It was not voted on by the Chamber of Deputies, and as new elections took place at the end of that year, the legislation died. In May 2009, a new civil code was proposed by the government. The parliamentary subcommittee responsible for drafting the Civil Code amended the definition of marriage to being "between a man and a woman". An amendment was also passed stating that the Romanian state would not recognise foreign same-sex marriages. Article 259(1) of the Civil Code states that marriage is "the freely consented union between one man and one woman". In addition, article 277(1) of the code emphasizes that "marriage shall be prohibited between persons of the same sex".

On 27 September 2018, less than two weeks before the referendum to ban same-sex marriage, the Constitutional Court of Romania ruled that same-sex couples have the same rights to privacy and family life as heterosexual couples. The ruling, hailed as "landmark" by LGBT advocacy groups, stated that legal rights and obligations should be equal under law. However, the court also ruled that the term "spouses" can only refer to a "man and woman", since this was the intention of the original constitutional lawmakers. (Note: The Romanian Constitutional Court ruled that a proposal to replace "between spouses" (între soți) with "between a man and a woman" (între un bărbat și o femeie) in the Constitution was redundant, because that was the meaning of "between spouses" in the text.) A lesbian couple was able to marry at Bucharest City Hall in September 2022 because one of the spouses was transgender and had not completed a legal gender change.

=== Political viewpoints ===
With the exceptions of the Save Romania Union and the Green Party, none of Romania's major political parties, either in government or in opposition, explicitly support same-sex marriage or registered partnerships, or have proposed any law regarding it, resulting in debate on this issue in the political sphere being more reserved than in civil society and the media.

On 6 June 2006, the Cotidianul newspaper conducted interviews with representatives of the five main political parties, asking them about their stance on same-sex marriage. Crin Antonescu, the leader of the parliamentary delegation of the National Liberal Party, part of the governing coalition, declined to give an official party view on the matter. Instead, he said that "both the party and myself have given proof that we are in favour of recognising sexual minorities. However, personally I am against marriage between people of the same sex." The leader of the Democratic Party, also part of the governing coalition, was similarly elusive, stating that: "Now is not the right moment to talk about this issue [same-sex marriage]. We now have other much more important things to do regarding European integration. Let's integrate firstly, and then we can see the way in which mentalities change. Eventually, we will discuss this issue then." Romania's EU accession took place in January 2007. Mayor Liviu Negoiţă of Sector 3 in Bucharest said that "if a law will exist [legalising same-sex marriage], I will respect it. As a mayor, I don't have any other choice. Personally, I respect the sexual choice of each person". The largest opposition party, the Social Democrats, whose stance on social issues is usually more conservative than that of the then-governing parties, stated that they would "not initiate and would not support such a legislative proposal". However, the party's official spokesperson also proclaimed that, "a public debate [on same-sex marriage] is necessary, in order to see in what way the standards regarding fundamental liberties can be improved in regard to people with another sexual orientation".

Opposition was seen most clearly from the far-right, nationalist Greater Romania Party. The vice-president of the party stated that "clearly, we wouldn't initiate such a legislative proposal, since we're a Christian party. The sin of sodomy is one of the biggest [sins]." The Conservative Party was less vocal in its opposition to same-sex marriage, with Octavian Petrovici, the vice-president of the party's Bucharest division, stating that "it's their own choice, and in the same way that we respect the option of every citizen, we respect the choice of these people. However, it is a long way from respecting a choice to making special laws, which do not match the values and principles that our party affirms." On 27 November 2006, the women's wing of the Conservative Party adopted a resolution opposing same-sex marriage and adoption by same-sex couples. The resolution declared that "the family has as its primary aim our continuity and we will continue to support its development, particularly since we will be confronted in the future with an accentuated process of aging and a significant reduction in the population. We reject categorically the legalisation of same-sex marriage." On 10 June 2007, after Bucharest Pride, the Conservative Party reiterated its position on same-sex marriage, stating: "The sexual options of each citizen are accepted and respected in Romania, but from here until the adoption of special laws for sexual minorities is too long a way. We support the definition of marriage as a union between one man and one woman."

=== Attempts to pass constitutional ban ===
Article 48 of the Constitution of Romania states:

The family is founded on the freely consented marriage of the spouses, their full equality, as well as the right and duty of the parents to ensure the upbringing, education and instruction of their children. (Note: In some languages of Romania: Romanian: Familia se întemeiază pe căsătoria liber consimţită între soţi, pe egalitatea acestora şi pe dreptul şi îndatorirea părinţilor de a asigura creşterea, educaţia şi instruirea copiilor.; Hungarian: A család a házastársak szabad akaratnyilvánításából létrejött házasságon, a házastársak egyenlőségén és a szülők azon jogán és kötelezettségén alapul, hogy biztosítsák a gyermekek eltartását, nevelését és oktatását.)

Amending the Romanian Constitution requires approval by the people through a referendum. Until 2014, referendums required a 50% voter turnout to be valid, but changes to electoral law subsequently reduced this to 30%.

==== June 2013 attempts ====
On 5 June 2013, a parliamentary committee tasked with reviewing the Constitution voted to include sexual orientation as a protected ground against discrimination. The same committee voted the following day to change the text on marriage from "the family is founded on the freely consented marriage of the spouses" to "the family is founded on the freely consented marriage between a man and a woman alone", thus banning same-sex marriage. Green MP Remus Cernea described the move to ban same-sex marriage as "clearly a democratic setback; Romania should now be included among the most homophobic countries in the world." Many NGOs opposed the move to ban same-sex marriage and released a common statement arguing that the provision prohibiting discrimination based on sexual orientation should remain in the Constitution. Florin Buhuceanu, the executive director of ACCEPT, said: "We see the scale of schizophrenia: one day you accept sexual orientation as a constitutional protected ground [against discrimination], the next day you act discriminately on the basis of sexual orientation proposing a different treatment for these citizens of Romania of this sexual orientation." Csaba Ferenc Asztalos, the president of the National Council for Combating Discrimination, thought that the new amendments "[were] brought to the table just to manipulate, just to incite, just to serve other goals then a real problem (...) [and] that at this point we are channeling the societal hatred through acts like the Constitution only, for example, to have [political] quorum (...) and this is not normal".

Faced with backlash from civil society and domestic and international organizations, the committee retracted both amendments. Save Romania Union was the only party with parliamentary representation that positioned itself against a potential referendum to amend the constitutional definition of the family and ban same-sex marriage in Romania.

==== 2018 referendum ====
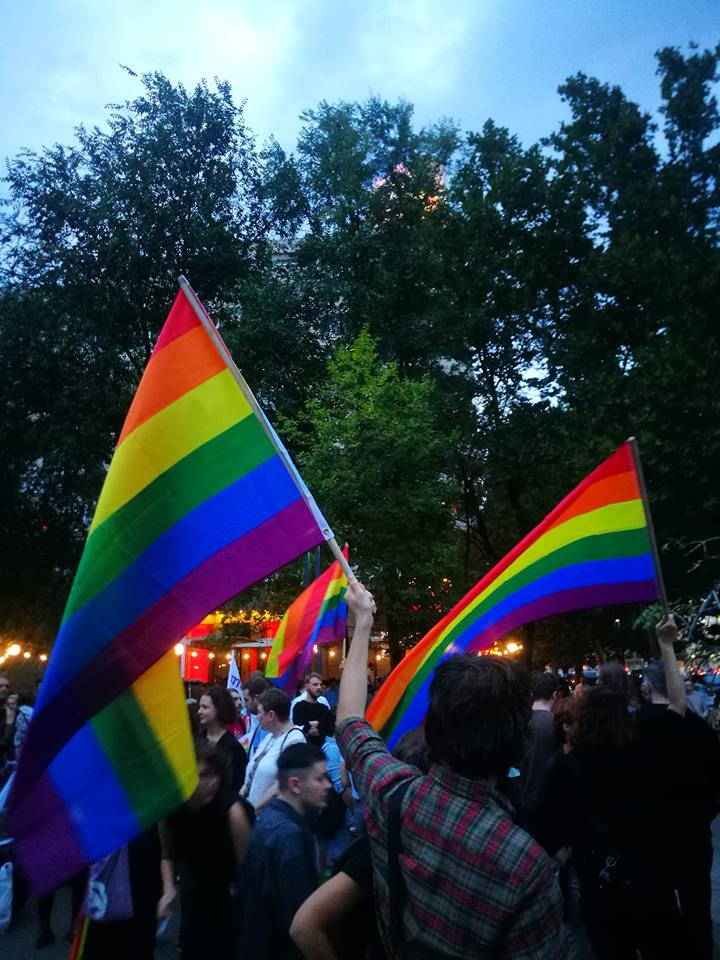
Protest against the referendum at the University Square in Bucharest, September 2018

The Romanian Government announced plans to hold a referendum in the fall of 2017, following a successful citizens' initiative by a group opposed to same-sex marriage, the Coalition for Family (Coaliția pentru Familie), which collected an estimated 3 million signatures in support of banning same-sex marriage. The Chamber of Deputies approved the initiative on 9 May 2017 in a 232–22 vote. However, no referendum was held that year. The government proposed to hold the referendum in May or June 2018, though these months also passed without a vote. Eventually, the referendum was confirmed to be held on 6 and 7 October 2018. The amendment was supported by religious groups. President Klaus Iohannis opposed the amendment, while many human rights activists called for a boycott. The referendum proceeded as planned on 6 and 7 October, and cost an estimated €43 million. It failed to achieve validity as the turnout was 21.1%, well below the 30% required under the law. The lowest turnout (8.5%) was recorded in Covasna County. The highest turnout (30.7%) was in Suceava County, the only county to surpass the 30% threshold.

=== Recognition of marriages performed abroad ===
==== European Court of Justice ruling in Coman and Others ====
In 2018, the European Court of Justice (ECJ) ruled in favour of a Romanian national, Adrian Coman, seeking to have his marriage to his American husband Clai Hamilton recognised in Romania. The couple had married in Belgium in 2010, where same-sex marriage has been legal since 2003. European Union (EU) law permits a non-EU spouse of an EU citizen to join their spouse in the member state where the European national resides. However, Romanian authorities refused to issue a residence permit to Hamilton, arguing that he could not be recognised as Coman's spouse because Romanian law prohibits same-sex marriages. The couple filed suit, arguing that the refusal discriminated on the basis of sexual orientation, which is banned in Romania. The Constitutional Court heard oral arguments in 2016 and later decided to consult the ECJ on the matter. The ECJ began examining the case in November 2017. In January 2018, Advocate General Melchior Wathelet advised the court to rule in favour of the couple:

Although member states are free to authorize marriage between persons of the same sex or not, they may not impede the freedom of residence of an E.U. citizen by refusing to grant his or her spouse of the same sex, a national of a non-E.U. country, a right of permanent residence in their territory.

The ECJ ruled in the couple's favour on 5 June 2018, holding in Coman and Others v General Inspectorate for Immigration and Ministry of the Interior that member states must uphold the freedom of movement and residency rights of same-sex spouses, provided that one partner is an EU citizen. While EU member states may choose whether to legalise same-sex marriage, they cannot restrict the right of residence for EU citizens and their spouses. The ECJ also clarified that the term "spouse" is gender-neutral and does not necessarily refer to someone of the opposite sex. Coman welcomed the ruling, saying, "We can now look in the eyes of any public official in Romania and across the EU with certainty that our relationship is equally valuable and equally relevant for the purpose of free movement within the EU." White & Case, the law firm that represented the couple, and the International Lesbian, Gay, Bisexual, Trans and Intersex Association (ILGA) welcomed the court ruling, but it drew criticism from religious and conservative groups. The Romanian Orthodox Church called the ruling "anti-democratic". The court ruled:

The Court finds that the obligation for a Member State to recognise a marriage between persons of the same sex concluded in another Member State in accordance with the law of that state, for the sole purpose of granting a derived right of residence to a third-country national, does not undermine the institution of marriage in the first Member State, which is defined by national law and falls within the competence of the Member States. Such recognition does not require that Member State to provide, in its national law, for the institution of marriage between persons of the same sex. It is confined to the obligation to recognise such marriages, concluded in another Member State in accordance with the law of that state, for the sole purpose of enabling such persons to exercise the rights they enjoy under EU law.

On 18 July 2018, the Romanian Constitutional Court ruled that the government must grant residency rights to the same-sex partners of EU citizens. This followed an attempt for recognition by Coman and Hamilton following the ECJ ruling the previous month. In March 2021, it was reported that Romania had yet to issue a residence permit to Hamilton. In September 2023, the government announced its intention to draft legislation to comply with the ECJ ruling. The draft law would allow foreign same-sex marriages performed in a EU member state to be recognized in Romania.

==== European Court of Justice ruling in Cupriak-Trojan and Trojan ====
On 22 November 2025, the European Court of Justice expanded on its previous ruling, holding in Jakub Cupriak-Trojan and Mateusz Trojan v Wojewoda Mazowiecki, a Polish case, that all member states of the European Union must recognise same-sex marriages validly performed within the European Union. The case involved a dual Polish-German couple who had married in Germany but sought recognition of their marriage in Poland. Romania is therefore legally obliged to comply with the ruling, though legal experts noted that the decision "[would] necessitate updates to administrative procedures and civil status registers" to align with EU law. If the government refuses to process marriage licenses from same-sex couples, those couples can challenge the decision in Romanian courts, which are bound to apply EU law. The ruling had an immediate legal effect in Romania, with media outlets reporting that "authorities must recognize same-sex marriages performed abroad as full marriages". Cupriak-Trojan and Trojan does not compel Romania to change its domestic laws to legalise same-sex marriage, but it does require that the country accept the legal status of couples married elsewhere in the European Union.

In May 2026, ACCEPT lodged an administrative request calling on the government to recognise same-sex marriages performed in other EU member states and transcribe them into civil registers.

=== Religious performance ===
Most major Christian denominations in Romania do not bless or perform same-sex marriages. The Romanian Greek Catholic Church, the Romanian Orthodox Church and the Roman Catholic Church oppose same-sex marriage and do not allow their clergy to officiate at such marriages. The three denominations campaigned to constitutionally ban same-sex marriage in the 2018 referendum. The Unitarian Church of Transylvania did not take a position on the amendment. In 2017, its synod voted to only bless marriages recognized by the state, but allowed individual members to express their own opinions on the matter. Deputy Bishop Dávid Gyerő expressed support for same-sex marriage in 2016.

Romania's first religious same-sex marriage ceremony was performed on 5 June 2006 following Bucharest Pride, when Florin Buhuceanu, a spokesman for ACCEPT, married his Spanish partner of four years. The symbolic marriage, which has no legal status in Romania, was blessed by the Metropolitan Community Church in Bucharest, an international denomination which recognises same-sex unions and supports LGBT rights. The couple officially married later in 2006 in a civil marriage in Spain, where same-sex marriage is legal.

== Public opinion ==
The 2015 Eurobarometer found that 21% of Romanians supported same-sex marriage. This represented a 10% increase from 2006. Support across the European Union was 61%. According to a 2017 Pew Research Center poll, 26% of Romanians supported same-sex marriage, while 74% were opposed. Opposition was 66% among 18–34-year-olds. A Romanian Institute for Assessment and Strategy (IRES; Institutul Român pentru Evaluare și Strategie) poll conducted in December 2018 found that 27% of Romanians supported same-sex marriage, while 72% were opposed and 1% were undecided or did not answer. In addition, 38% of Romanians supported registered partnerships, while 60% were opposed and 2% were undecided or did not answer.

The 2019 Eurobarometer found that 29% of Romanians thought same-sex marriage should be allowed throughout Europe, while 63% were against. An ACCEPT 2021 study, carried out by telephone questionnaires on 1,064 people aged 18 years old and over, showed that 43% of respondents supported reforms to allow either civil unions or same-sex marriage. This figure was twice what had been reported in 2016. Support was highest among those who were under the age of 34 at 56%. Of those questioned, 68% said that same-sex families should be protected by the law in Romania like all other families. The majority of those that expressed support for allowing same-sex marriage also supported allowing same-sex couples to raise children.

A GLOBSEC survey conducted in March 2023 showed that 37% of Romanians supported same-sex marriage, while 58% were opposed. The 2023 Eurobarometer found that 25% of respondents thought same-sex marriage should be allowed throughout Europe, while 69% were opposed. The survey also found that 27% of Romanians thought that "there is nothing wrong in a sexual relationship between two persons of the same sex", while 68% disagreed. This was the second lowest level of support for same-sex marriage in the European Union, ahead only of Bulgaria.

== See also ==
- LGBT rights in Romania
- Recognition of same-sex unions in Europe
