= Recognition of same-sex unions in Ukraine =

Ukraine does not recognize same-sex marriage or civil unions, as the Constitution of Ukraine defines marriage as between "a woman and a man". Nonetheless, on 10 June 2025 a court in the Desnianskyi District recognized a same-sex couple as a family, in a ruling later upheld by the Supreme Court of Ukraine on 25 February 2026. The issue of legal recognition for same-sex couples has become particularly acute after the start of Ukraine's accession to the European Union in 2022 and the Russian large-scale invasion of Ukraine during the Russo-Ukrainian War.

In August 2022, President Volodymyr Zelenskyy said his government was working on passing a civil partnership law that would provide same-sex couples with some of the rights and benefits of marriage. A petition in support of civil partnerships was submitted to the Verkhovna Rada in April 2023. In May 2023, Zelenskyy said that the Ministry of Justice was working on introducing partnership legislation. The following month, the European Court of Human Rights imposed a positive obligation on the government, in Maymulakhin and Markiv v. Ukraine, to establish a legal framework recognizing same-sex unions. Polling suggests that a majority of Ukrainians support the legal recognition of same-sex registered partnerships. Nonetheless, a draft civil code submitted to the Verkhovna Rada by Chairman Ruslan Stefanchuk in January 2026 defines the family as "the cohabitation of a man and a woman" and explicitly excludes the recognition of same-sex partnerships.

== Civil partnerships ==
Laws regarding same-sex partnerships in Europe¹ Marriage Civil union Limited domestic recognition (cohabitation) Unrecognized Constitution limits marriage to opposite-sex couples ¹ May include recent laws or court decisions that have not yet entered into effect.

=== Background ===
On 23 November 2015, the Government of Ukraine approved an action plan to implement a "National Strategy on Human Rights" (Ukrainian: Національна стратегія у сфері прав людини, Nacionál'na stratéhija u sféri prav ljudýny) in the period up to 2020, which included the promise of drafting a bill creating civil partnerships for opposite-sex and same-sex couples by 2017. However, in early 2018, the Ministry of Justice, led by Pavlo Petrenko, stated that "the development and submission to the government of a draft law on the legalization of a registered civil partnership in Ukraine cannot be implemented" due to "numerous appeals from the regional councils, the Council of Churches and other religious organizations".

On 3 June 2022, an online petition was launched on the official website of the President of Ukraine calling for the legalization of same-sex marriage. Citing the Russian invasion of Ukraine, the text of the petition stated: "At this time, every day may be the last. Let people of the same sex have the opportunity to start a family and have an official document confirming this. They need the same rights as traditional couples." Oksana Solonska, the media communications manager of Kyiv Pride, said, "It is important that LGBTQ people have the right to see their partner and take their body from the morgue, and seek compensation if needed. All married couples have these rights. We really hope that same-sex marriage will be legalised, so people will be able to take care of each other." The petition quickly gained signatures, and by 13 July, the petition had gathered more than 28,000 signatures. Petitions that gather more than 25,000 signatures automatically trigger the president's consideration.

On 2 August 2022, President Volodymyr Zelenskyy issued an official response to the petition. Zelenskyy said it would be impossible to legalize same-sex marriage without an amendment to the Constitution of Ukraine, and that "[t]he Constitution of Ukraine cannot be changed during martial law or a state of emergency". "The Family Code of Ukraine defines that the family is the primary and main unit of society. A family consists of persons who live together, are connected by common life, have mutual rights and obligations. According to the Constitution of Ukraine, marriage is based on the free consent of a woman and a man (Article 51)", Zelenskyy wrote. However, Zelenskyy said that his government would work on a bill to legalize civil partnerships in Ukraine. "In the modern world, the level of democratic society is measured, among other things, through state policy aimed at ensuring equal rights for all citizens. Every citizen is an inseparable part of civil society, he is entitled to all the rights and freedoms enshrined in the Constitution of Ukraine. All people are free and equal in their dignity and rights." He called on Prime Minister Denys Shmyhal to address the issue. Shmyhal instructed the Ministry of Justice, the Ministry of Foreign Affairs and the Ministry of Social Policy to consider the issues raised in the petition. As a member of the Council of Europe, Ukraine falls under the jurisdiction of the European Court of Human Rights (ECHR). In January 2023, the Grand Chamber of the European Court of Human Rights ruled in Fedotova and Others v. Russia that Article 8 of the European Convention on Human Rights, which guarantees a right to private and family life, imposes a positive obligation on all member states of the Council of Europe to establish a legal framework recognizing same-sex partnerships.

The Russo-Ukrainian War has spurred efforts within the military to legalize same-sex unions, because the partners of gay soldiers are not afforded the same rights and privileges as opposite-sex partners, "although they are fighting just as bravely as their fellow straight combat troops". A soldier in the Donbas said, "When we defend the country, we dismantle Russian propaganda about all gay people being communists, Marxists, and anti-Ukraine. We have destroyed these homophobic myths by fighting the Russians and risking our lives for Ukraine." In August 2023, two women, Stanislava Petlysia and Alina Shevchenko, held a symbolic same-sex wedding ceremony in Kharkiv to protest the lack of legal recognition of same-sex relationships.

=== Introduction of legislation in 2023 ===
Same-sex couples do not have a right to inheritance, hospital visitations or to make medical decisions for an ill partner. "If [my] (partner) dies ... [I] won't be allowed even to bury [him] ... they might not let [me] into the hospital", said a cadet specialising in aerial reconnaissance who had joined the Armed Forces of Ukraine in the wake of the Russian invasion. LGBT groups described Zelenskyy's statement as "historic", and called on a bill to be passed as soon as possible: "People need this now", said Olena Shevchenko. The introduction of civil partnerships (Ukrainian: цивільне партнерство, cyvílʹne partnérstvo, pronounced [tsɪˈwilʲne pɐrtˈnɛrstwo]) (Note: In some regional languages of Ukraine: Bulgarian: регистрирано партньорство, registrírano partnjórstvo, pronounced [rɛɡiˈstrirɐno ˈpartnjorstvo]; Crimean Tatar: vatandaş ortaqlıq, pronounced [vɑtɑnˈdɑʃ ortɑqˈlɯq]; Hungarian: bejegyzett élettársi kapcsolat, pronounced [ˈbɛ.jɛɟzɛtː ˈeːlɛtːaːrʃi ˈkɒptʃolɒt]; Romanian: parteneriat înregistrat, pronounced [parteˈnerjat ɨnreˈdʒistrat]; Russian: гражданское партнёрство, graždánskoje partnjórstvo, pronounced [ɡrɐʐˈdanskə.jə pɐrtˈnʲɵrstvə]; Urum: цивил ортаклык, sivil ortaklık) would allow same-sex couples to enjoy some of the rights and benefits of marriage, including property rights, maintenance, inheritance and spousal privilege, among others. MP Inna Sovsun of the Holos party said she was considering introducing her own civil union bill to the Verkhovna Rada should the government fail to do so. She introduced a bill with 18 cosponsors in March 2023. The bill passed two parliamentary committees with unanimous support in May. A petition in support of registered partnerships was submitted to Parliament in April 2023 with 25,000 signatures.

In May 2023, Zelenskyy said that the Ministry of Justice was working on introducing its own partnership bill. The Ministry gave final approval to a draft civil union bill on 22 October 2023, and the government vowed to approve it by the end of 2023. Conservative politician Andriy Kozhemiakin of the Batkivshchyna party told Parliament in June 2023 he supported the measure because "If it will never exist in Russia, it should exist and be supported here." However, the bill has stalled due to opposition from members of the Legal Affairs Committee. In August 2024, the Committee on National Health, Medical Care and Medical Insurance recommended the Parliament to pass the legislation. Zelenskyy reiterated his support in November 2024. On 14 May 2025, the government approved a roadmap for joining the European Union, which included calls for the adoption of a law on registered partnerships, with implementation scheduled for the third quarter of 2025. On 22 January 2026, a draft civil code was submitted to the Verkhovna Rada by Chairman Ruslan Stefanchuk, intended to "harmonize Ukrainian family law with European Union standards". It would define the family as "the cohabitation of a man and a woman" and include provisions automatically annulling marriages if one spouse undergoes sex reassignment surgery. Stefanchuk described the proposal as "modern and European". The legislation would explicitly exclude same-sex partnerships. On 12 March, the Ministry of Justice criticized the draft code, arguing that its exclusion of the recognition of same-sex unions runs counter to European integration and Ukraine's accession plans to the European Union. It emphasized that ignoring this issue violates the state's positive obligations under Articles 8 and 14 of the European Convention on Human Rights. The code was approved 254–2 in first reading on 28 April.

== Same-sex marriage ==
=== Background ===
Article 51 of the Constitution of Ukraine, adopted by the Verkhovna Rada in 1996, states: "Marriage is based on the free consent of a woman and a man. Each of the spouses has equal rights and duties in the marriage and family." (Note: Ukrainian: Шлюб ґрунтується на вільній згоді жінки і чоловіка. Кожен із подружжя має рівні права і обов’язки у шлюбі та сім'ї.) The Family Code of Ukraine likewise does not permit same-sex marriages; article 21 states that "marriage is a family union between a woman and a man". In June 2018, the Ministry of Justice said that "there [was] no legal grounds" for same-sex marriage in Ukraine. The wording of Article 51 is interpreted as banning same-sex marriage; however, in 2022, Olha Sovgirya, a justice of the Constitutional Court of Ukraine, said she believed that the Constitution does not prohibit same-sex marriage, arguing that the "emphasis in Article 51 is on the freedom of marrying a member of the opposite sex, and not on the fact that the parties should be of different sexes."

=== Maymulakhin and Markiv and subsequent changes ===
On 1 June 2023, the European Court of Human Rights (ECHR) ruled in Maymulakhin and Markiv v. Ukraine that the government had violated the human rights of a same-sex couple, Andriy Maymulakhin and Andriy Markiv, by denying them a marriage license. The couple had been denied a license at seven registry offices in Kyiv in October 2014, and challenged the refusal at the ECHR in November 2014. The ECHR has also issued similar rulings with respect to Russia in Fedotova and Others, and Romania in Buhuceanu and Others. The court ruled that Article 8 (right to respect for private and family life) and Article 14 (prohibition of discrimination) of the European Convention on Human Rights imposed a positive obligation on the government to recognise same-sex unions:

As a result, same-sex couples were denied any opportunity to regulate fundamental aspects of life as a couple except certain property-related aspects, and then only as private individuals entering into contracts under the ordinary law. The Court has already held that such private contractual agreements cannot be considered to give recognition and the required protection to a couple, as they are limited in scope and fail to provide for basic rights. In general, there was no possibility for a same-sex couple to rely on the existence of their relationship in dealings with the judicial or administrative authorities, as regards, for example, the right to joint matrimonial property, the right to inheritance by law, the right to receive visits from the partner in the event of hospitalisation, the right to refuse to testify against one another, the right to adoption, and the right to social assistance and benefits for low-income families. It followed that Mr Maymulakhin and Mr Markiv had been treated differently from opposite-sex couples on account of the lack of any legal recognition and protection for them. Their sexual orientation had been the sole basis for the difference in treatment.

On 10 June 2025, a court in the Desnianskyi District recognized the "existence of actual marital relations" between two men. In June 2024, Zorian Kis was appointed first secretary of the Ukrainian embassy in Israel. Kis and his partner Timur Levchuk, who had been living together since 2013 and were married in the United States in 2021, sought recognition of their relationship by the Ministry of Foreign Affairs. The ministry refused and denied Levchuk spousal rights to accompany Kis on his diplomatic posting to Israel. The couple appealed the decision in court. The application was submitted to the Desnianskyi District Court in September 2024. The Supreme Court of Ukraine also intervened in the case, ordering the lower court to open proceedings and hear oral arguments. The district court opened proceedings on 7 May 2025, and on 10 June ruled that their relationship constituted a de facto marriage under Ukrainian law, thus recognizing them as a family. The court considered their 2021 marriage, alongside documentation of the couple's shared finances, property and witness testimony. It also cited the Constitution of Ukraine and ECHR case law in Maymulakhin and Markiv in reaching its decision. The couple said they were "surprised" by the court decision. The ruling was upheld by the Kyiv Court of Appeal in September 2025, and an appeal was dismissed by the Supreme Court on 25 February 2026. Despite the court ruling, the Foreign Ministry once again refused to grant "family member" status to Levchuk in May 2026.

=== Religious performance ===
The Catholic Church opposes same-sex marriage and does not allow its priests to officiate at such marriages. In December 2023, the Holy See published Fiducia supplicans, a declaration allowing Catholic priests to bless couples who are not considered to be married according to church teaching, including the blessing of same-sex couples. The Conference of Roman Catholic Bishops in Ukraine issued a statement that it saw a "danger in ambiguous wording that causes divergent interpretations among the faithful". "What we missed in the document is that the Gospel calls sinners to conversion, and without a call to leave the sinful life of homosexual couples, the blessing may look like an endorsement." The Ukrainian Greek Catholic Church, in full communion with the Holy See, announced it would not bless same-sex couples. The Major Archbishop of Kyiv–Galicia, Sviatoslav Shevchuk, said the declaration "has no legal force for the faithful of the Ukrainian Greek Catholic Church".

== Public opinion ==
Russia's invasion of Ukraine in 2022 has bolstered support for the recognition of same-sex unions in Ukraine. Surveys by Nash Svit for the Kyiv International Institute of Sociology showed that opposition to same-sex civil unions had decreased from 69% in 2016 to 42% in 2022. Jul Sirous, a coordinator for volunteers and teamwork at Kyiv Pride, said, "[People are] now looking at some things in a completely different light because compared to the fact that a person might be gone tomorrow, the fact that they are gay or a lesbian – we're not paying attention to that."

A 2022 poll conducted by the Center for Social Expertise of the Institute of Sociology at the National Academy of Sciences of Ukraine showed that 27% of Ukrainians supported same-sex marriage and 26% supported it with "some exceptions", meaning that 53% supported the recognition of same-sex unions in some form. This represented a large increase from 2016 when 33% of the population supported recognising same-sex unions.

According to a poll conducted in January 2023 by the National Democratic Institute with the help of the Kyiv International Institute of Sociology, 56% of Ukrainians agreed that same-sex partners should have the right to register their relationship in the form of a civil partnership, while 24% disagreed. In addition, 44% of Ukrainians supported same-sex marriage, while 36% were opposed, and 30% supported adoption by same-sex couples, while 48% were against. According to a June 2024 survey by the Kyiv International Institute of Sociology, 29% of respondents said they supported civil partnerships for same-sex couples without the possibility to adopt, while 36% were opposed and 26% were "indifferent".

== See also ==
- LGBTQ rights in Ukraine
- Recognition of same-sex unions in Europe
- Marriage in Ukraine
