= Recognition of same-sex unions in Bulgaria =

Bulgaria does not recognize same-sex marriage or civil unions. Although the recognition of same-sex unions has been frequently debated in recent years, no law addressing the issue has been passed by the National Assembly. In September 2023, the European Court of Human Rights obliged the government in Koilova and Babulkova v. Bulgaria to establish a legal framework recognizing same-sex unions. Additionally, on 22 November 2025 the European Court of Justice ruled in Jakub Cupriak-Trojan and Mateusz Trojan v Wojewoda Mazowiecki, a Polish case, that all member states of the European Union must recognise same-sex marriages validly performed within the European Union.

The Constitution of Bulgaria defines marriage as "a union between a man and a woman", effectively prohibiting the legalization of same-sex marriage. Only civil marriages are recognised by law in Bulgaria.

== Registered partnerships ==
=== Background ===
In 2008 and 2009, there were many debates on several national TV stations on the subject of registered partnerships, with the participation of politicians, religious leaders, gay activists and others. The government had suggested that the National Assembly vote in favor of a new family code, which was supposed to include registered partnerships (Bulgarian: регистрирано партньорство, registrírano partnjórstvo, pronounced [rɛɡiˈstrirɐno ˈpartnjorstvo]) (Note: Turkish: medeni birliktelik, pronounced [medeˈni biɾlicteˈlic]; Romani: registrime partneripe) providing some of the rights and benefits of marriage. These partnerships would not have been open to same-sex couples; however, on July 16, 2008, the Commission for Protection against Discrimination (CPD; Комисия за защита от дискриминация, Komísiya za Zaštíta ot Diskriminátsiya) suggested that the right to registered partnerships be extended to same-sex couples as well. The Catholic Church subsequently announced its opposition to recognising registered partnerships, stating that legally recognising partnerships for both different-sex and same-sex couples would "weaken" and "jeopardise" the institution of marriage. Some opponents further stated that the law change would legalise incest and polygamy, despite the draft code explicitly prohibiting both. On June 12, 2009, the new Family Code (Семеен кодекс, Seméen Kódeks) was passed without provisions recognizing registered partnerships for either same-sex or opposite-sex couples.

The issue of whether the Family Code should recognise registered partnerships and provide cohabiting couples with several rights available to married couples, including the right to adopt and provide consent for medical treatment, resurfaced in 2012. Opponents claimed that legalising registered partnerships would "weaken" the institution of marriage and "confuse" children, while supporters argued that it would protect couples who choose not to marry as well as their children. According to the National Statistical Institute, about 59% of Bulgarian children were born to unmarried parents in 2012.

=== Koilova and Babulkova and aftermath ===
On 5 September 2023, the European Court of Human Rights (ECHR) ruled in Koilova and Babulkova v. Bulgaria that the government had unfairly discriminated against a same-sex couple, Darina Koilova and Lilia Babulkova, Bulgarian nationals who had legally married in the United Kingdom in November 2016, by refusing to recognise their marriage. The couple had filed a lawsuit in Lyulin in 2017 to have their marriage recognised in Bulgaria. The Sofia Administrative Court rejected their case in January 2018. However, a group of lawyers representing the couple appealed that decision. The Supreme Administrative Court of Bulgaria upheld the lower court's decision in December 2019. The couple issued the following statement after the court ruling, "The law's job is to regulate realities in a society. Our family is such a reality, and I regret that the Supreme Court in our country did not have the courage to admit this fact. Not recognizing our marriage does not have the power to break the bond between us. But it has the power to make our lives much more difficult. It is a pity when your own country creates difficulties and makes you feel small and insignificant, and I am sure that in this respect, many people know how we feel. Now, however, holidays are coming and we just want to wish everyone to enjoy them with their loved ones, with warmth and affection, as we will do."

The case was appealed to the ECHR in 2020, which held oral arguments on 4 July 2023. The court issued its decision on 5 September, overturning the previous court rulings and concluding that the government had violated Article 8 of the European Convention on Human Rights, which protects the right to private and family life. The court imposed a positive obligation on the government to establish a legal framework recognising same-sex unions. However, the court also emphasised existing case law in Schalk and Kopf v. Austria that there is no obligation under the Convention to legalise same-sex marriage. Human Rights Watch issued a statement following the decision, urging the government to "swiftly implement the court's judgment". The Grand Chamber of the European Court of Human Rights had already ruled in January 2023 in Fedotova and Others v. Russia that Article 8 imposes a positive obligation on all member states of the Council of Europe to recognize same-sex partnerships.

== Same-sex marriage ==
Laws regarding same-sex partnerships in Europe¹ Marriage Civil union Limited domestic recognition (cohabitation) Unrecognized Constitution limits marriage to opposite-sex couples ¹ May include recent laws or court decisions that have not yet entered into effect.

=== Background ===
The Constitution of Bulgaria explicitly prohibits the recognition of same-sex marriage. Article 46(1) states: "Matrimony shall be a free union between a man and a woman. Only a civil marriage shall be legal." (Note: Bulgarian: Бракът е доброволен съюз между мъж и жена. Законен е само гражданският брак.) As a result, any future laws recognising same-sex marriage would be unconstitutional; the only way to legalise same-sex marriage in Bulgaria would be to amend the Constitution, which requires a two-thirds majority in the National Assembly on three occasions.

=== Recognition of marriages performed abroad ===
On 5 June 2018, the European Court of Justice ruled in favour of a Romanian-American same-sex couple seeking recognition of their marriage in Romania, so that the American partner could reside in the country. The court held in Coman and Others v General Inspectorate for Immigration and Ministry of the Interior that European Union (EU) member states must uphold the freedom of movement and residency rights of same-sex spouses, provided that one partner is an EU citizen. While EU member states may choose whether to legalise same-sex marriage, they cannot restrict the right of residence for EU citizens and their spouses. The ECJ also clarified that the term "spouse" is gender-neutral and does not necessarily refer to someone of the opposite sex. On 22 November 2025, the European Court of Justice expanded on this ruling, holding in Jakub Cupriak-Trojan and Mateusz Trojan v Wojewoda Mazowiecki, a Polish case, that all member states of the European Union must recognise same-sex marriages validly performed within the European Union. The case involved a dual Polish-German couple who had married in Germany but sought recognition of their marriage in Poland. Bulgaria is therefore legally obliged to comply with the ruling, though legal experts noted that the decision "[would] necessitate updates to administrative procedures and civil status registers" to align with EU law. If the government refuses to process marriage licenses from same-sex couples, those couples can challenge the decision in Bulgarian courts, which are bound to apply EU law. The ruling had an immediate legal effect in Bulgaria, with media outlets reporting that "authorities must recognize same-sex marriages performed abroad as full marriages". Cupriak-Trojan and Trojan does not compel Bulgaria to change its domestic laws to legalise same-sex marriage, but it does require that the country accept the legal status of couples married elsewhere in the European Union.

On 29 June 2018, a court in Sofia granted residency rights to a same-sex couple—a French-Australian lesbian couple who had married in France in 2016 and were denied residency in Bulgaria in 2017 when they attempted to renew their residency status, which had previously been granted under an EU mobility directive. In January 2019, Bulgarian immigration officials appealed the decision. On 25 July 2019, the Supreme Administrative Court upheld the lower court's ruling. The couple's lawyer, Denitsa Lyubenova, said the move could be "an important first step toward the legalization of same-sex marriage in Bulgaria".

== Public opinion ==
The 2015 Eurobarometer found that 17% of Bulgarians supported same-sex marriage. This was the lowest support in the European Union, and only a 2% change from the 2006 Eurobarometer, when 15% of Bulgarians expressed support for same-sex marriage. The 2019 Eurobarometer found that 16% of Bulgarians thought same-sex marriage should be allowed throughout Europe, while 74% were against.

A GLOBSEC survey conducted in March 2023 showed that 21% of Bulgarians supported same-sex marriage, while 69% were opposed. The 2023 Eurobarometer found that 17% of respondents thought same-sex marriage should be allowed throughout Europe, while 75% were opposed. The survey also found that 21% of Bulgarians thought that "there is nothing wrong in a sexual relationship between two persons of the same sex", while 72% disagreed. This was the lowest level of support for same-sex marriage in the European Union.

== See also ==
- LGBTQ rights in Bulgaria
- Common-law marriage
- Recognition of same-sex unions in Europe
