= Grand Chamber of the European Court of Human Rights =

European court

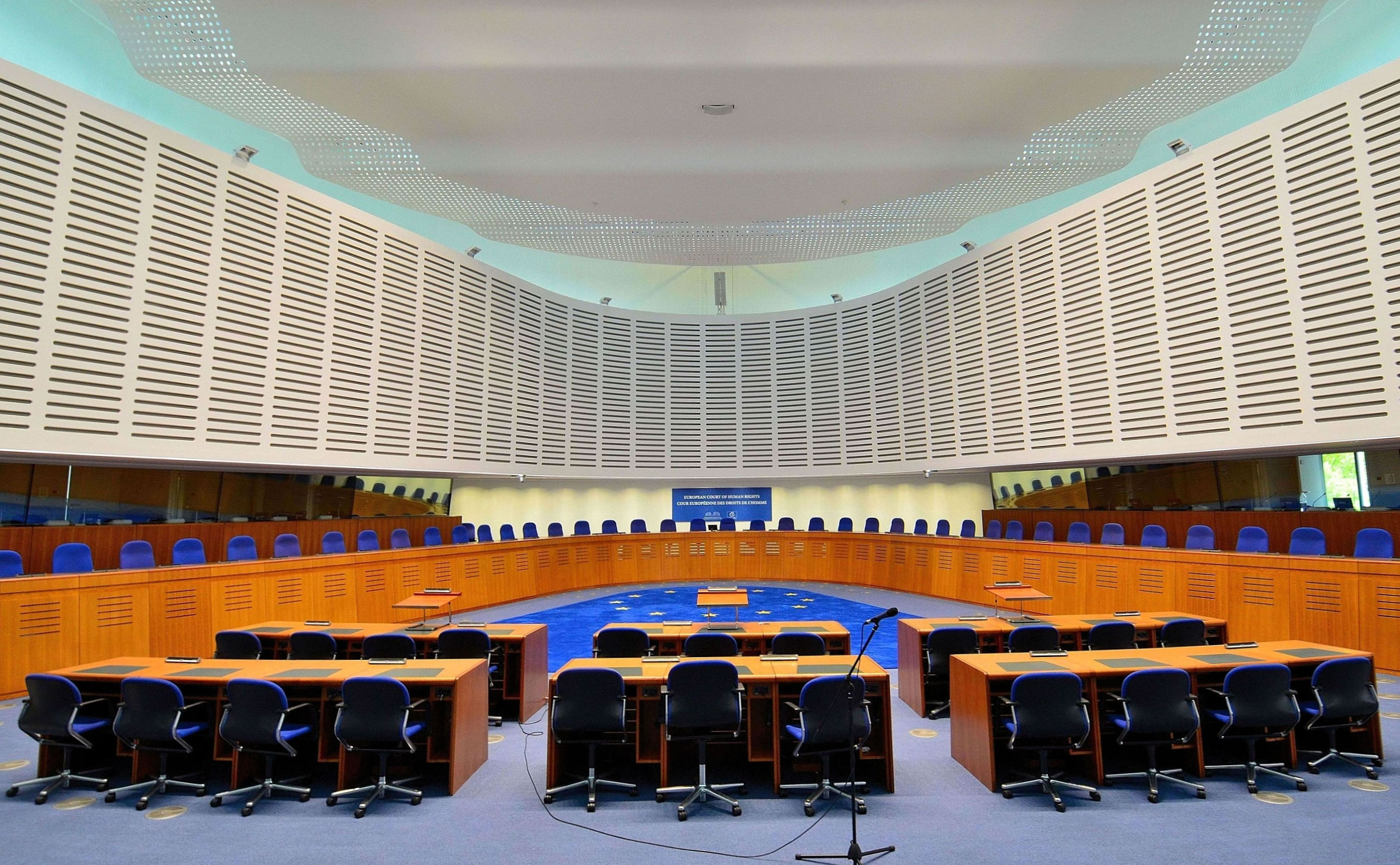
European Court of Human Rights courtroom

The Grand Chamber of the European Court of Human Rights (ECtHR) consists of 17 judges of the ECtHR and is convened in exceptional cases. Its verdicts cannot be appealed.

The Grand Chamber may be convened either by referral or relinquishment. Referral is based on one of the parties appealing a ruling made by a chamber of the court, but the court only agrees to convene the Grand Chamber in exceptional cases. Relinquishment means that a chamber of the court decides not to hear the case itself but instead leaves the Grand Chamber to hear the case. Until 1 August 2021, when Protocol 15 to the European Convention on Human Rights came into effect, parties to the case had the right to object to relinquishment.

The main function of the Grand Chamber lies in managing the Court's judicial legitimacy — both by improving the quality and consistency of its case law and by providing a higher degree of collective control over its most important judgments.
