= Positive obligation =

Duty to perform certain acts

Positive obligations in human rights law denote a State's obligation to engage in an activity to secure the effective enjoyment of a fundamental right, as opposed to the classical negative obligation to merely abstain from human rights violations.

Classical human rights, such as the right to life or freedom of expression, are formulated or understood as prohibitions for the State to act in a way that would violate these rights. Thus, they would imply an obligation for the State not to kill, or an obligation for the State not to impose press censorship. Modern or social rights, on the other hand, imply an obligation for the State to become active, such as to secure individuals' rights to education or employment by building schools and maintaining a healthy economy. Such social rights are generally more difficult to enforce. This is due to the scarcity of public resources required to fulfill positive obligations. The European Court of Human Rights in Strasbourg (ECtHR) ruled in Osman v. United Kingdom that a positive obligation "must be interpreted in a way which does not impose an impossible or disproportionate burden on the authorities". The German Federal Constitutional Court and the Constitutional Court of Portugal apply the "proviso of the possible" as a limitation of positive obligations.

Positive obligations transpose the concept of State obligations to become active into the field of classical human rights. Thus, in order to secure an individual's right to family life, the State may not only be obliged to refrain from interference therein, but positively to facilitate for example family reunions or parents' access to their children.

The most prominent field of application of positive obligations is Article 8 of the European Convention on Human Rights.

In 2021, the ECtHR ruled in Fedotova and Others v. Russia that there was a positive obligation to recognize same-sex partnerships based on article 8.
