= LGBTQ rights in Moldova =

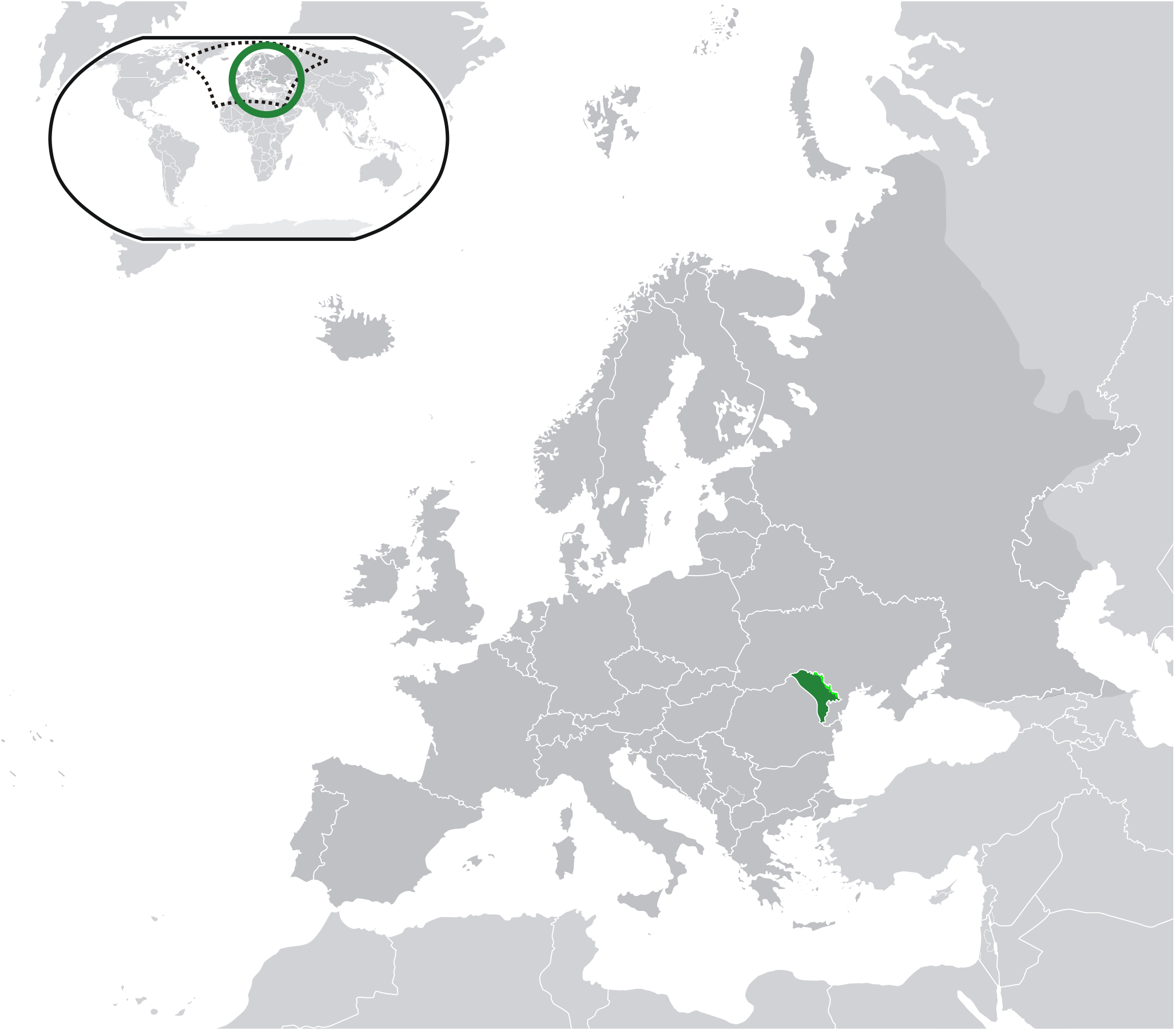
- Location of Moldova (green) – Transnistria (light green) on the European continent (green + dark grey)
- Legal status: Yes, legal since 1995
- Gender identity: Yes, right to change legal gender (with psychiatric diagnosis)
- Military: Gays, lesbians and bisexuals allowed to serve
- Discrimination protections: Sexual orientation and gender identity protection (see below)

Family rights
- Recognition of relationships: No recognition of same-sex relationships
- Restrictions: Same-sex marriage constitutionally banned
- Adoption: No

Lesbian, gay, bisexual, and transgender (LGBT) people in Moldova face legal and social challenges and discrimination not experienced by non-LGBTQ residents. Households headed by same-sex couples are not eligible for the same rights and benefits as households headed by opposite-sex couples. Same-sex unions are not recognized in the country, so consequently same-sex couples have little to no legal protection. Nevertheless, Moldova bans discrimination based on sexual orientation in the workplace, and same-sex sexual activity has been legal since 1995.

Since the Dissolution of the Soviet Union, Moldova has come increasingly under the influence of the Orthodox Christian Church. The country has been marred by human rights violations, including violations of freedom of association and freedom of speech. Moldova's first pride parade was held in 2002. Since then, however, pride parades have encountered stiff opposition from authorities and religious leaders, and have often been cancelled or banned due to safety concerns. A successful pride parade took place in May 2018 in Chișinău, after police officials protected the participants from violent radical Orthodox groups.

Moldovan society remains very problematic in that regard, as discrimination and violence against members of the LGBT community are commonplace. In 2012, ILGA-Europe ranked Moldova last in a list of 49 European countries with regard to LGBT legislation. By 2023 Moldova had climbed to the 23rd place, its rise in ranking due to continued expansion of anti-discrimination laws with regard to sexual orientation and gender identity.

== Legality of same-sex sexual activity ==
Since 1995, homosexuality between consenting adults in private has been legal in Moldova. In September 2002, new laws were introduced equalising the age of consent.

== Recognition of same-sex relationships ==
Moldova does not recognize same-sex marriage or civil unions. The Moldovan Constitution explicitly defines marriage as being between a man and a woman.

== Discrimination protections ==
For a long time, a large coalition of human rights organisations, including GenderDoc-M, lobbied the Moldovan Government for the implementation of anti-discrimination legislation in line with European standards, which would include sexual orientation as a protected ground.

A law banning discrimination on the basis of sexual orientation in employment was adopted by the Moldovan Parliament on 25 May 2012, and signed into law by President Nicolae Timofti on 28 May 2012. The law took effect on 1 January 2013.

The so-called "media propaganda law", which entered into force on 1 January 2019, controversial for its ban on "Russian television programs on news, analysis, politics, and military issues", also contains a clause banning media broadcasters from discriminating on the basis of sexual orientation. Article 11 of the law, entitled the Codul serviciilor media audiovizuale al Republicii Moldova, states that "audiovisual programs are prohibited: ... from propagating incitement, promotion or justification of racial hatred, xenophobia, anti-Semitism or other forms of hatred founded on intolerance or discrimination based on sex, race, nationality, religion, disability or sexual orientation."

In 2023, The Parliament of Moldova passed Law No.2 (2023) which included sexual orientation and gender identity among grounds protected from "any kind of discrimination".

== Gender identity and expression ==
Transgender people are allowed to change their legal name and gender on official documents in Moldova, but require a psychiatric diagnosis confirming their "transgenderism" to do so.

== Public opinion ==
Moldovan society remains very conservative; politicians often make derogatory remarks about the LGBT community, and discrimination against its members is commonplace.

Same-sex marriage support among Moldovans
Year	Pollster	Results	
Year	Pollster	Yes	No
2014	IPP	6%	87%
2016	Fundația Soros – Moldova	5%	94%
2017	Pew Research Center	5%	92%
2022	Europa Liberă Moldova	14%	86%

A sociological survey by the Institute of Public Policies in 2014 showed negative public attitudes among Moldovans towards the LGBT community. Asked what they think about gays and lesbians, 7.9% responded to "mental illness", 6.3% "abnormal", 6.1% "sick", 5.5% "loose", while 2.5% believe gays and lesbians should be killed. 83% of Moldovans did not accept LGBT people, and 35.8% strongly supported the criminalization of homosexual relations by banning rights (61.2%), fining LGBT people (35.5%) or imprisonment (27.2%). 88.8% of Moldovans would be bothered if a family member was LGBT, and 92% would not accept an LGBT educator/teacher in the class where their child is studying.

According to the study "Church and State in the Republic of Moldova" presented by the Soros Foundation - Moldova in 2016, 84% of Moldovans would not accept homosexuals living in Moldova, 89% would not accept that they live in the same locality, 94% would not accept to have them as neighbors, 95% would not accept being friends and 97% would not want gay family members. The same study revealed that only 5% of Moldovans agreed with same-sex marriages and 6% with civil partnerships. These observations showed that Moldovan society is conservative, and with little willingness to accept minorities.

In May 2017, a survey by the Pew Research Center in Eastern European countries showed that 92% of Moldovans believed that homosexuality should not be accepted by society. Among young people between 18 and 34, the percentage fell to 88%. According to the same survey, 5% of Moldovans supported same-sex marriages.

However, since the decriminalization of homosexuality in 1995, the attitude of various state institutions has become increasingly tolerant. For example, the Ministry of Health communicated in an official letter that homosexuality is not considered a disease, and medical services are accessible to all, regardless of the sexual orientation of the citizen.

== Social conditions ==
=== Gay culture ===
Moldova has a rather small but lively and open-minded gay scene. Chișinău's first gay club, Jaguar Dance and Music Club, opened in 2009. Moldova's first gay pride parade (named Moldova Pride) was held in April 2002, but it was banned in 2007, because homosexuality was said to "undermine the Christian values of Moldova".

=== LGBT rights movement ===
The main gay and lesbian campaigning group is called GenderDoc-M. The group seeks to support and protect gays and lesbians in Moldova, and raises awareness of the lives of LGBT people.

=== Anti-LGBT sentiment ===
Moldovan society still remains very traditional. Virulent homophobic statements are casually made by politicians, and lesbians and gays are routinely discriminated against. Violence towards gay men is not uncommon.

Scott Lively, a vociferous opponent of gay rights who has linked homosexuality to having played a part in the spawning of the Rwandan genocide and the Holocaust, visited Moldova in 2010 to oppose an anti-discrimination measure. The bill had passed through committee twice before stalling subsequent to opposition from the Party of Communists of the Republic of Moldova, which cited Lively's visit as a reason for its opposition. The bill, however, was approved in 2012.

In May 2019, Doina Ioana Străisteanu, a human rights lawyer representing Moldova's only LGBT organization, GENDER-DOC, since 2010, was the victim of an arson attack. She found her car alight outside her office in central Chișinău by an unknown male assailant. She reported the attack to police who she said refused to investigate because it did not consider the damage "significant".

=== 2008 Moldova Pride controversy ===
On 11 May 2008, the police and authorities stood by as the Moldova Pride parade was prevented by crowds who surrounded, intimidated and even attacked parade participants. The Mayor of Chișinău, Dorin Chirtoacă, whose campaign slogan was "a young mayor, a liberal team, a European capital", had banned the parade the evening before.

The banning of the pride parade and the crackdown of freedom of assembly drew criticism and concern internationally, including by the then British Foreign Secretary, David Miliband.

The May 2007 Bączkowski and Others v. Poland ruling was a landmark case, in which the European Court for Human Rights (ECHR) ruled that by banning peaceful pride parades the then Mayor of Warsaw, Lech Kaczyński, had violated three articles of the European Convention of Human Rights: article 11 concerning freedom of assembly, article 13 which deals with the right to appeal, and article 14 which outlaws discrimination.

In 2012, the ECHR ruled that Moldovan authorities had violated human rights by cancelling the 2008 event.

=== 2017 and 2018 events ===
In May 2017, LGBT activists organised a peaceful march to coincide with the International Day Against Homophobia, Transphobia and Biphobia. Police officials cancelled the event shortly after it started due to safety concerns because fundamentalist Orthodox groups began attacking pride participants. President Igor Dodon supported the violent attacks, saying: "I have never promised to be the president of the gays, they should have elected their own president." He also personally met the radicals' group and congratulated them. Nevertheless, 450 people attended the march, which was the highest ever at the time.

In May 2018, LGBT activists successfully organised the 17th edition of Moldova Pride. Police protected the participants from radicals, using tear gas to repel them. President Dodon again congratulated the radical groups. The event drew support from numerous embassies (Argentina, Belgium, Canada, the Czech Republic, Denmark, Estonia, Finland, France, Germany, Ireland, Italy, Latvia, Lithuania, the Netherlands, Norway, Portugal, Slovenia, Spain, Sweden, Switzerland, the United Kingdom and the United States).

=== Bans on propaganda of homosexuality ===
Since 2012, several cities have enacted bans on "propaganda" of homosexuality (which do not include any kind of administrative sanctions or fines). These cities are:

- Bălți, enacted on 23 February 2012, and struck down on 28 February 2013
- Drochia, enacted on 27 March 2012
- Cahul, enacted on 29 March 2012
- Ceadîr-Lunga, enacted on 10 April 2012
- Glodeni, later repealed
- Rîșcani, later repealed
- Soroca

Similar bans were also enacted in the following districts:

- Anenii Noi, enacted on 1 March 2012
- Basarabeasca
- Fălești

Similar provisions were enacted by the following villages of Făleşti District:

- Bocani, later repealed
- Chetriș, repealed on 22 February 2012
- Hiliuți
- Pîrlița, later repealed

On 30 April 2013, the Parliament of Gagauzia approved a bill to forbid the "propaganda" of homosexuality, bisexuality and transness such as same-sex marriage and adoption by same-sex couples. The bill didn't include any kind of administrative sanctions or fines but some of its provisions banned any LGBT-related organizations from being registered in the region. Another provision was intended to ban any LGBT-related clubs and entertainment establishments. On 20 June 2013, these provisions were invalidated by a court decision, which held that these laws violated freedom of speech and human rights.

On 23 May 2013, despite the anti-discrimination law which prevents discrimination based on sexual orientation in employment, the Parliament of Moldova passed a bill which bans the propaganda of prostitution, paedophilia and "any other relations than those related to marriage and family in accordance with the Constitution and the Family Code". The bill also includes fines. The bill was signed into law on 5 July 2013 and came into effect on 12 July 2013. The law did not explicitly prohibit the "propaganda" of homosexuality, but it could have been interpreted as such by judges. On 11 October 2013, the Parliament passed a bill intended to remove the content which could have been interpreted as a ban on "homosexual propaganda".

=== UN Human Rights Council resolution ===
In June 2011, Moldova used its seat on the United Nations Human Rights Council to vote against the first successful UN resolution condemning discrimination and violence against individuals based on their sexual orientation and gender identity.

== Summary table ==
Same-sex sexual activity legal	Yes (Since 1995)
Equal age of consent (16)	Yes (Since 2002)
Anti-discrimination laws in employment	Yes (Since 2013)
Anti-discrimination laws in the media	Yes (Since 2019)
Anti-discrimination laws in the provision of goods and services	Yes (Since 2023)
Anti-discrimination laws in all areas (including hate speech)	Yes (Since 2023)
Anti-discrimination laws concerning gender identity	Yes (Since 2023)
Recognition of same-sex unions	No
Same-sex marriage	No (Constitutional ban since 1994)
Stepchild adoption by same-sex couples	No
Joint adoption by same-sex couples	No
Right to change legal gender	Yes (Psychiatric diagnosis required)
Gays, lesbians and bisexuals allowed to serve in the military	Yes
Access to IVF for lesbians	No
Commercial surrogacy for gay male couples	No
MSMs allowed to donate blood	No

== See also ==
- Human rights in Moldova
- LGBT rights in Transnistria
- LGBT rights in Europe
