= LGBTQ rights in Europe =

- Map of European countries
- Legal status: Legal, with an equal age of consent, in all 51 states Legal, with an equal age of consent, in all 6 dependencies and other territories
- Gender identity: Legal in 39 out of 51 states Legal in 3 out of 6 dependencies and other territories
- Military: Allowed to serve openly in 40 out of 47 states having an army Allowed in all 6 dependencies and other territories
- Discrimination protections: Protected in 44 out of 51 states Protected in all 6 dependencies and other territories

Family rights
- Recognition of relationships: Recognised in 29 out of 51 states Recognised in all 6 dependencies and other territories
- Restrictions: Same-sex marriage constitutionally banned in 15 out of 51 states
- Adoption: Legal in 23 out of 51 states Legal in 5 out of 6 dependencies and other territories

Lesbian, gay, bisexual, transgender, and queer (LGBTQ) rights are widely diverse in Europe per country. 22 of the 38 countries that have legalised same-sex marriage worldwide are situated in Europe. A further ten European countries have legalised civil unions or other forms of recognition for same-sex couples.

Several European countries do not recognise any form of same-sex unions. Marriage is defined as a union solely between a man and a woman in the constitutions of Armenia, Belarus, Bulgaria, Croatia, Georgia, Hungary, Latvia, Lithuania, Moldova, Montenegro, Russia, Serbia, Slovakia, and Ukraine. Of these, however, Croatia, Hungary, Latvia, and Montenegro recognise same-sex partnerships. Same-sex marriage is unrecognised but not constitutionally banned in the constitutions of Albania, Azerbaijan, Bosnia and Herzegovina, Kazakhstan, Kosovo, North Macedonia, Turkey, Romania and Vatican City, Poland.

All European countries that allow marriage also allow joint adoption by same-sex couples. Of the countries that have civil unions only, none but Croatia allows joint adoption, and only Czechia and San Marino allow step-parent adoption only.

The top ranking European countries in terms of LGBT equality according to ILGA-Europe are the Western European nations of Spain, Malta, Iceland, Belgium, and Denmark. The situation for LGBTQ people is considered the worst in Russia, Azerbaijan, Turkey, Belarus, and Armenia.

On 25 November 2025, the European Court of Justice has ruled that member states must recognise same-sex marriages lawfully concluded in another member state. The judges note that their decision does not oblige member states to amend their domestic legislation to recognise same-sex marriage, instead simply requiring them to recognise marriages lawfully concluded in another EU country. The procedure must be applied "without distinction or additional hurdles". The same court issued exactly the same ruling in June 2018 that was ignored by countries like Romania, Poland, Slovakia, Hungary, Bulgaria, and the Czech Republic.

Same-sex marriage
Civil unions
Limited domestic recognition (cohabitation)
Limited foreign recognition (residency rights)
No recognition
Constitutional limit on marriage

Countries in Europe recognising gender self-identification

Legal status of adoption by same-sex couples in Europe:
Joint adoption legal
Stepparent adoption legal
No laws allowing adoption by same-sex couples

LGBT rights in Europe
Same-sex marriage, full adoption rights and:
broad protection from discrimination
limited protection from discrimination
Registered partnership and:
full adoption rights and broad protection
stepchild adoption right and broad protection
broad protection from discrimination
limited protection from discrimination
No partnership recognition and:
broad protection from discrimination
limited protection from discrimination
no protection from discrimination
Restriction on freedom of expression

Trans rights in Europe
Legal gender change, surgery not required and:
broad protection from discrimination
limited protection from discrimination
no protection from discrimination
Legal gender change, surgery required and:
broad protection from discrimination
limited protection from discrimination
no protection from discrimination
Gender change illegal and:
broad protection from discrimination
no protection from discrimination
Legality of gender change unknown/ambiguous and no protection

Legal recognition of non-binary gender in Europe
Non-binary / third gender option available as voluntary opt-in, at least one district
Opt-in for foreign-born nationals if recognized in country of origin.
Note: Broad protection means protection from discrimination at least in employment and goods and services, limited protection means protection only in employment or only hate speech law.

== History ==
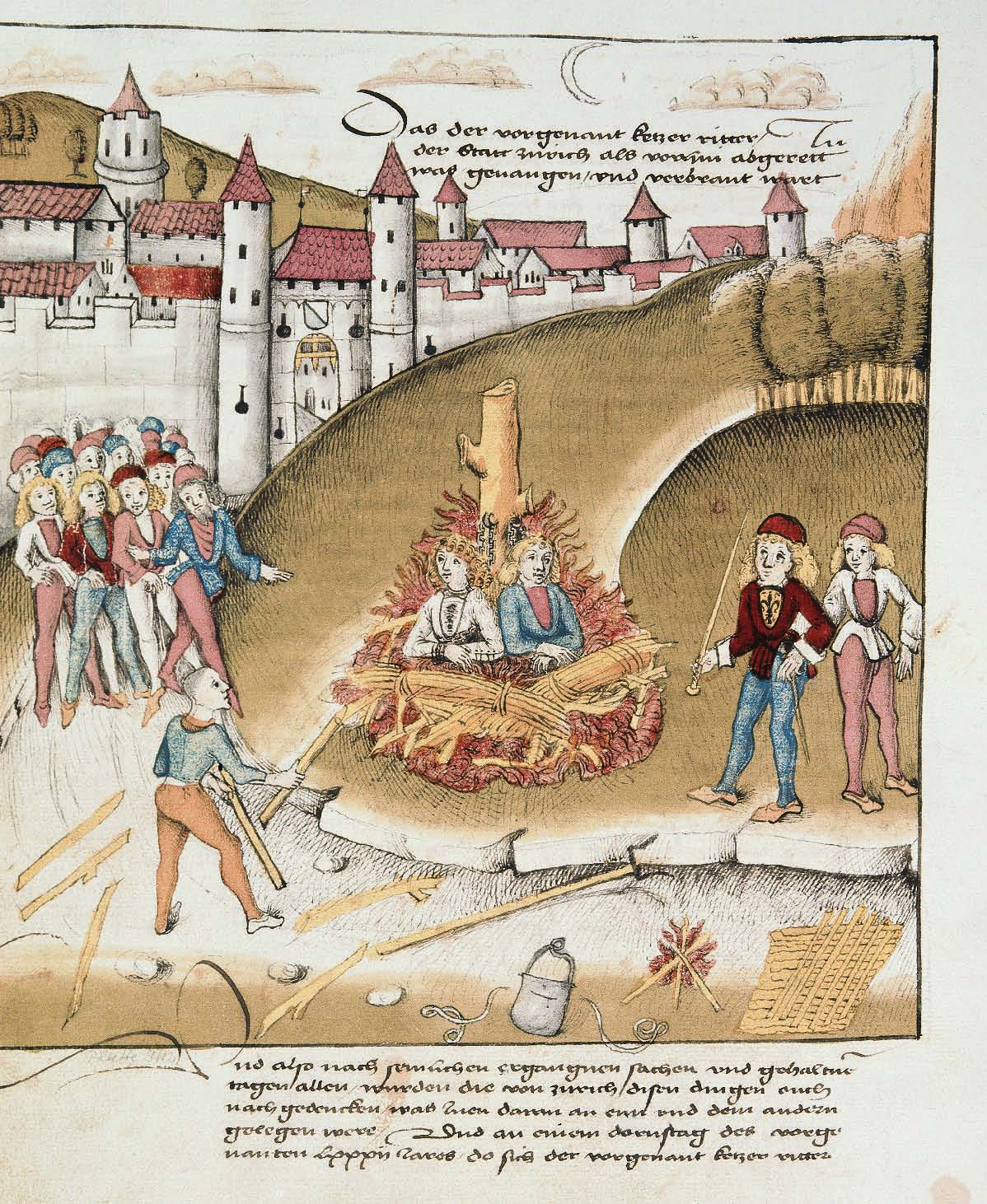
Swiss knight Sir Richard Puller von Hohenburg and his squire being burned at the stake for their acts of sodomy in Zurich, Switzerland. 1482 (Zurich Central Library).

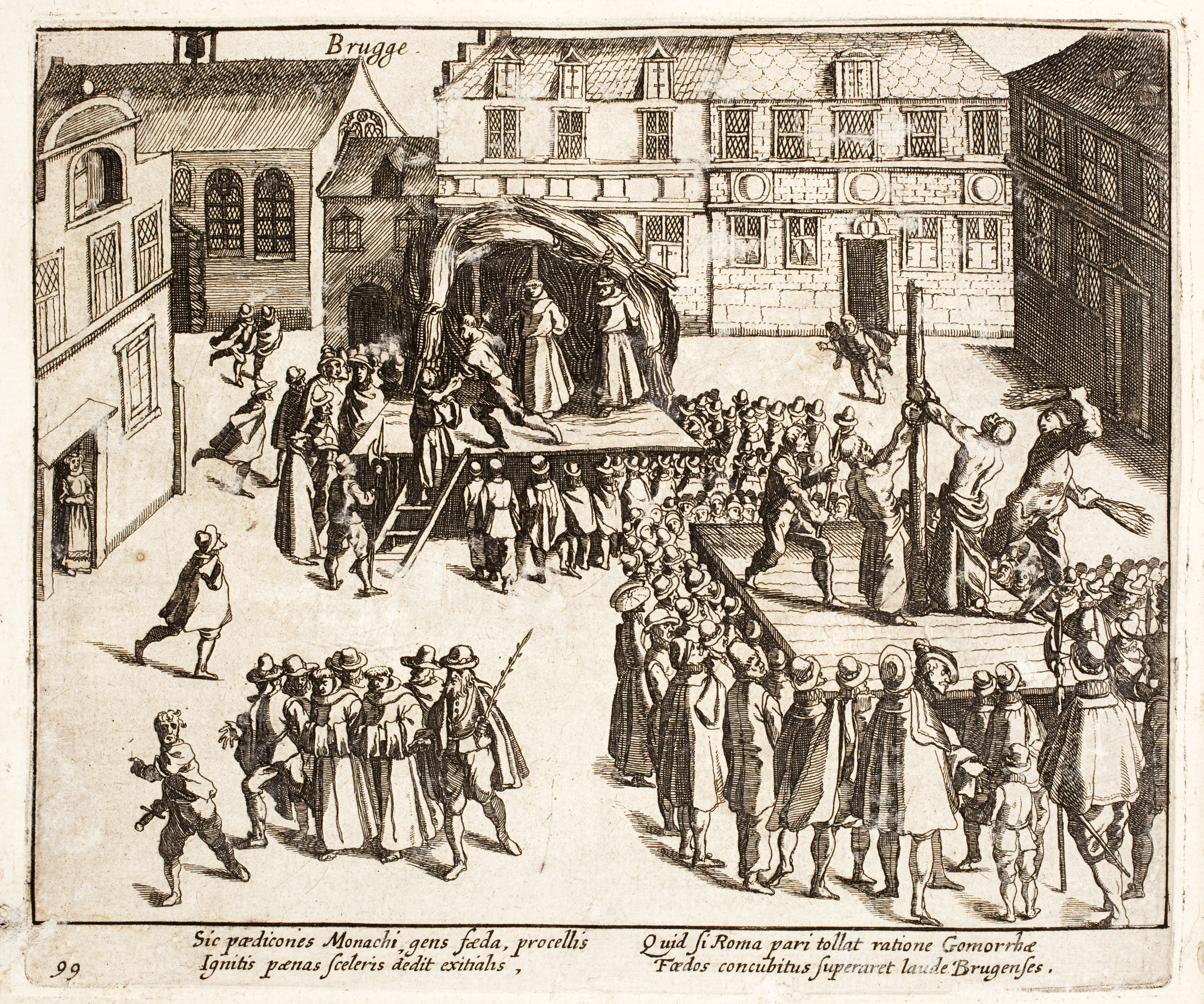
A 16th-century illustration of the execution of five Franciscan friars through fire and torture for sodomy in Bruges, Belgium. 26 July 1578.

Although same-sex relationships were quite common in ancient Greece, Rome and pagan Celtic societies, after Christianity became the official religion of the Roman Empire, severe laws against homosexual behaviour appeared. An edict by the Emperor Theodosius I in 390 condemned all "passive" homosexual men to death by public burning. This was followed by the Corpus Juris Civilis of Justinian I in 529, which prescribed public castration and execution for all who committed homosexual acts, both active and passive partners. In 670, Archbishop of Canterbury Theodore of Tarsus published a Penetential prescribing penances for homosexual activity comparable to those prescribed for murder and infanticide. Homosexual behaviour, called sodomy, was considered a capital crime in most European countries, and thousands of homosexual men were executed across Europe during waves of persecution in these centuries. Lesbians were less often singled out for punishment, but they also suffered persecution and execution from time to time.

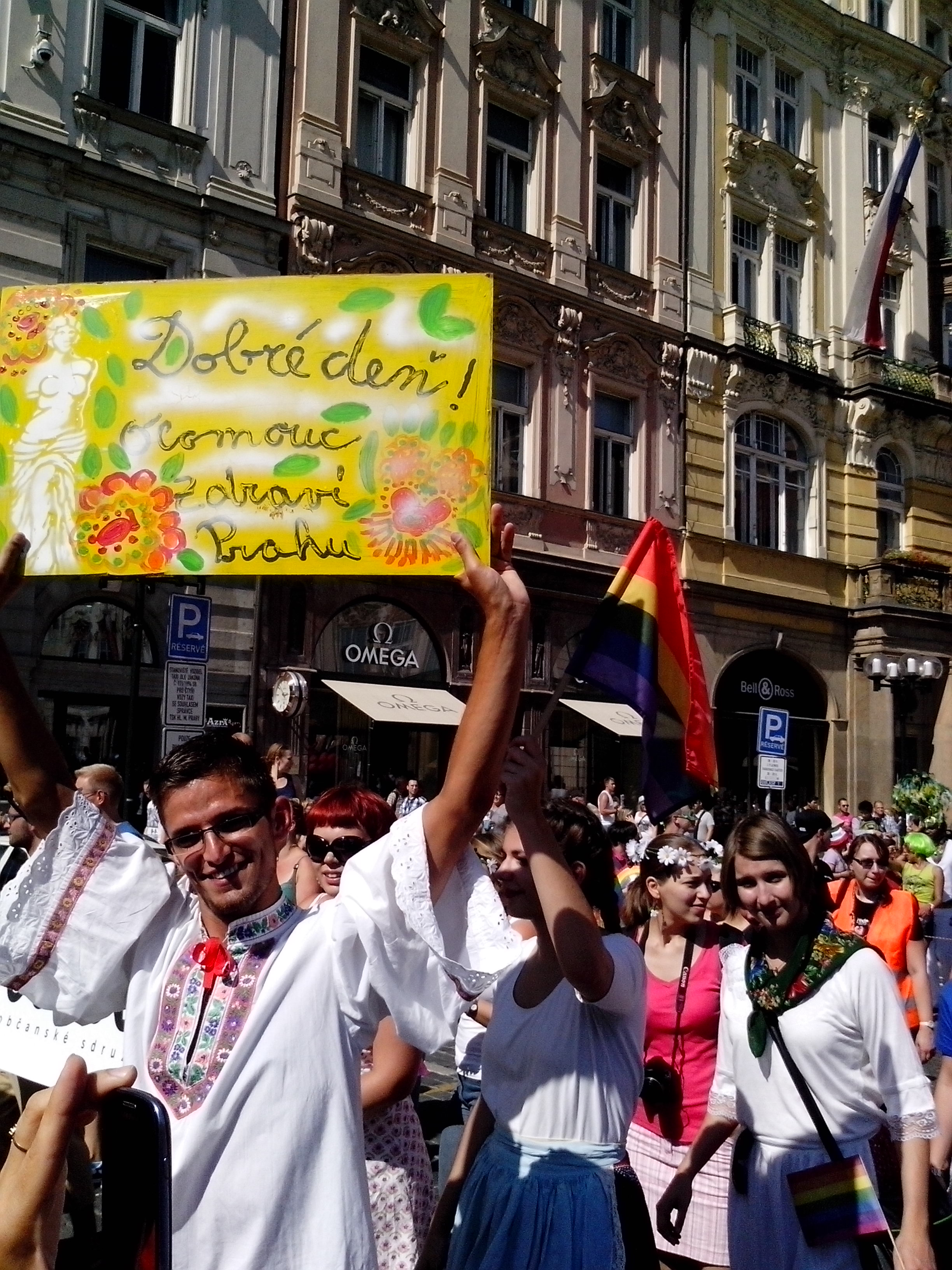
A participant of 2013 Prague Pride wearing a traditional Moravian dress (Hanakia) and a sign "Good day – Olomouc greets Prague"

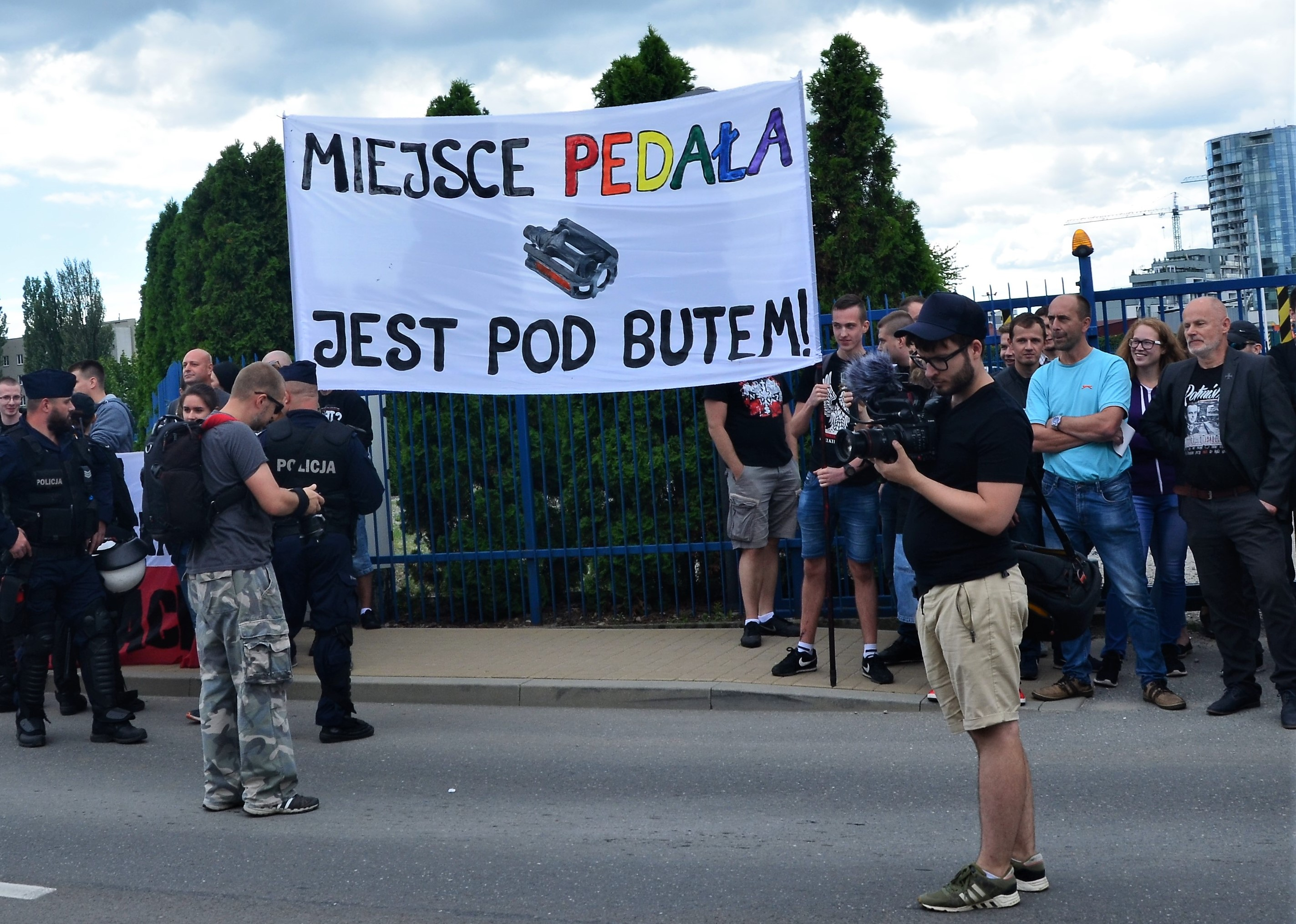
Counter-protesters against the 2019 equality march in Rzeszów: "fag's place is under the boot!"

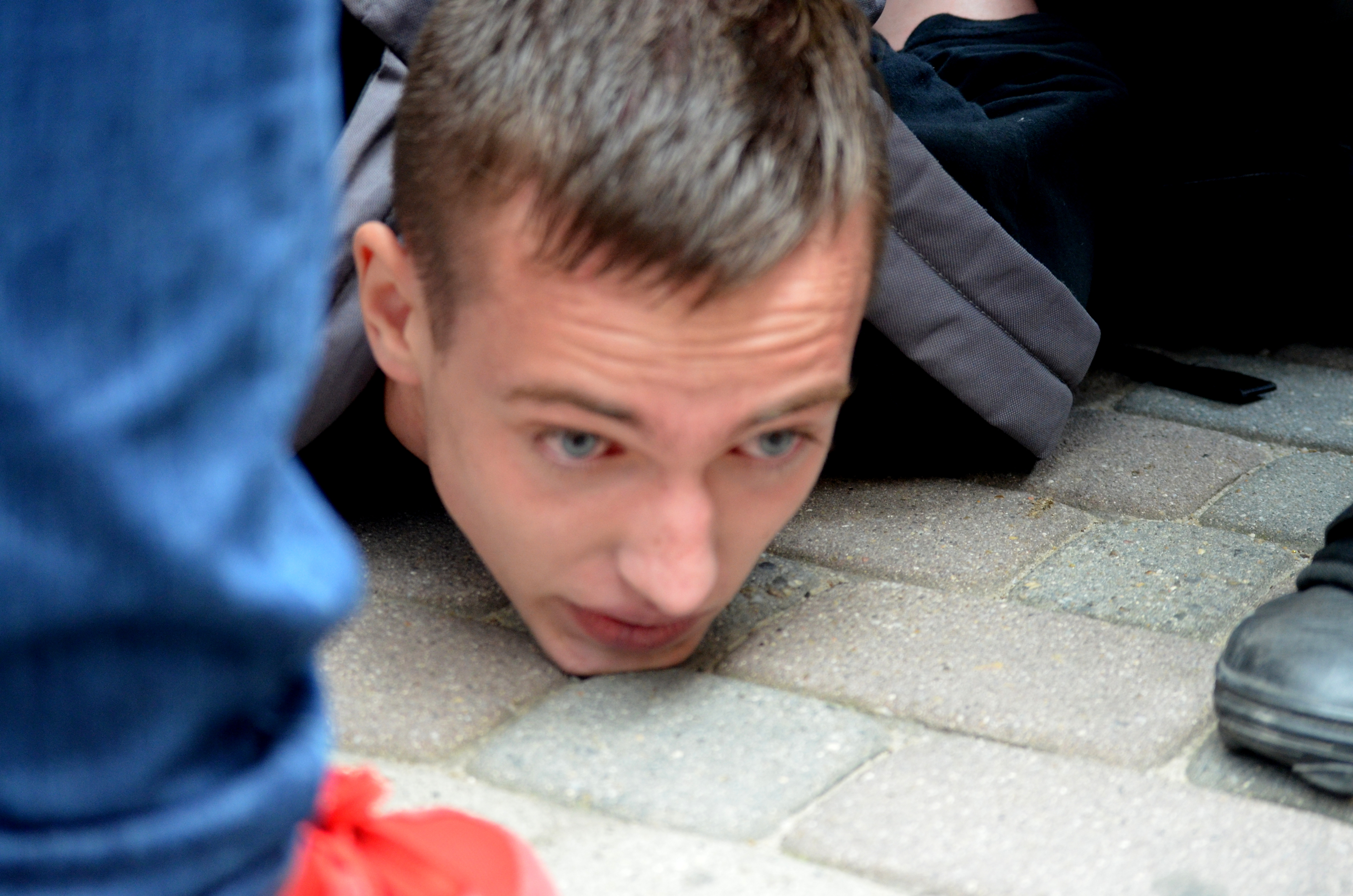
Radical right demonstrators attack participant in Rzeszów equality March 2018

Since the foundation of Poland in 966, Polish law has never defined homosexuality as a crime. Forty years after Poland lost its independence in 1795, the sodomy laws of Russia, Prussia, and Austria came into force in the partitioned Polish territory. Poland regained its independence in 1918 and abandoned the laws of the occupying powers. In 1932, Poland codified the equal age of consent for homosexuals and heterosexuals at 15.

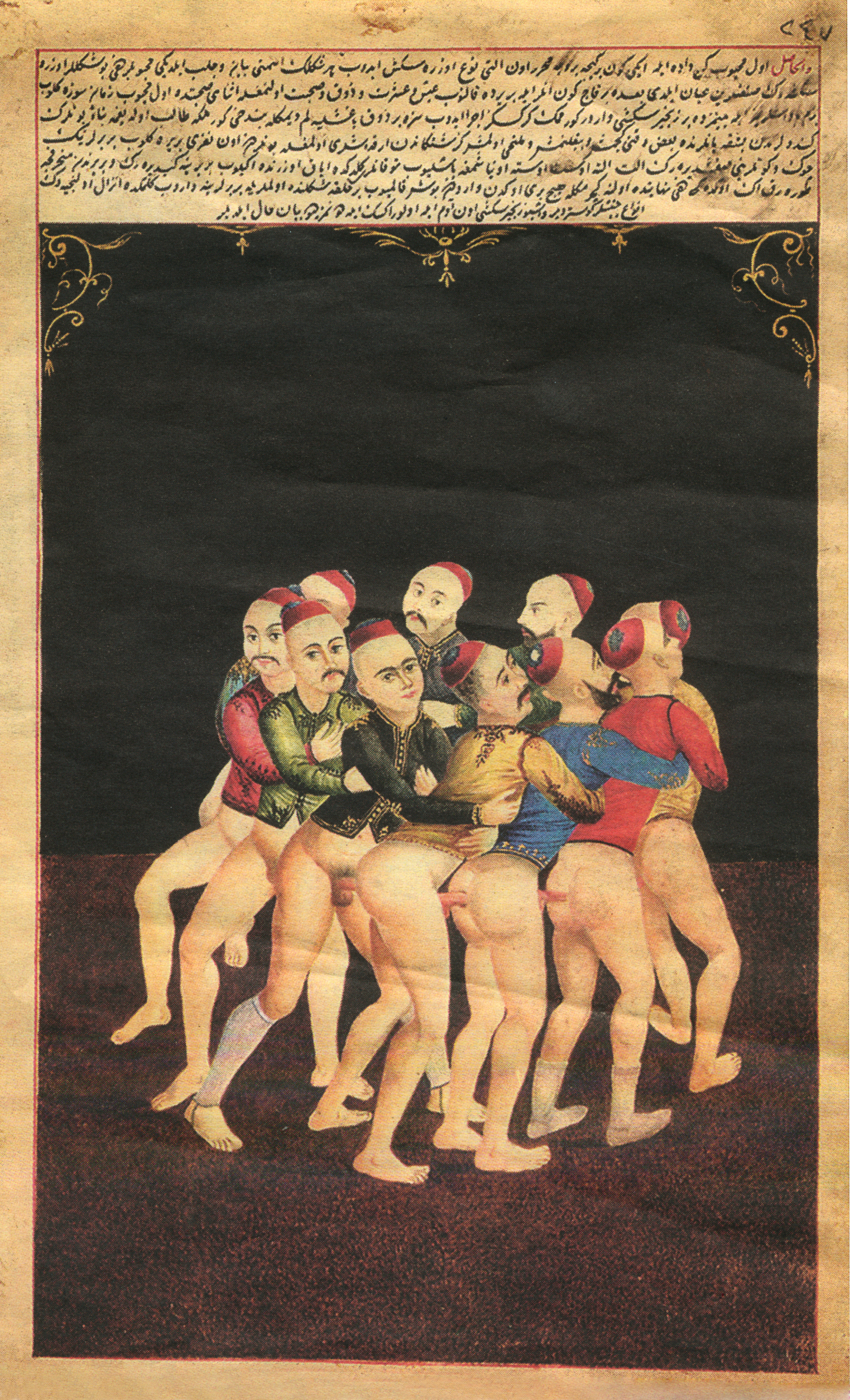
1773 Ottoman Tuhfet ul-Mulk manuscript verbally and visually instructing its reader how to regain his sexual virility

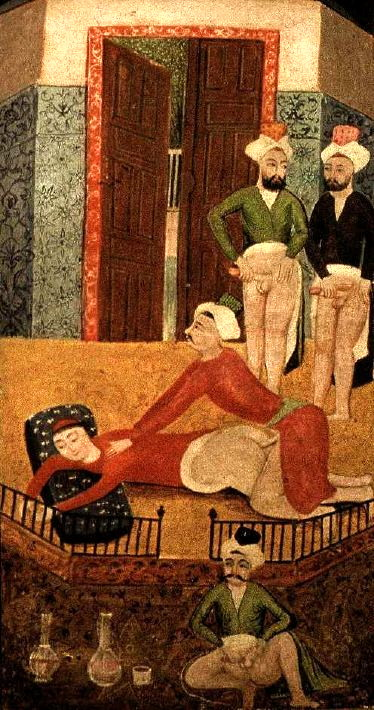
Ottoman illustration depicting a young man used for group sex (from Sawaqub al-Manaquib), 19th century

In Turkey, homosexuality has been legal since 1858.

During the French Revolution, the French National Assembly rewrote the criminal code in 1791, omitting all reference to homosexuality. During the Napoleonic Wars, homosexuality was decriminalised in territories coming under French control, such as the Netherlands and many of the pre-unification German states; however, in Germany this ended with the unification of the country under the Prussian Kaiser, as Prussia had long punished homosexuality harshly. On 6 August 1942, the Vichy government made homosexual relations with anyone under twenty-one illegal as part of its conservative agenda. Most Vichy legislation was repealed after the war—but the anti-gay Vichy law remained on the books for four decades until it was finally repealed in August 1982 when the age of consent (15) was again made the same for heterosexual as well as homosexual partners.

Nevertheless, gay men and lesbians continued to live closeted lives, since moral and social disapproval by heterosexual society remained strong across Europe for another two decades, until the modern gay rights movement began in 1969.

Various countries under dictatorships in the 20th century were very anti-homosexual, such as in the Soviet Union, in Nazi Germany and in Spain under Francisco Franco's regime. In contrast, after Poland regained independence after World War I, it went on in 1932 to become the second country in 20th-century Europe to decriminalise homosexual activity (after the Soviet Union, which had decriminalized it in 1917 under the Russian Soviet Federative Socialist Republic, but re-criminalized it in 1933 under Stalin), followed by Denmark in 1933, Iceland in 1940, Switzerland in 1942 and Sweden in 1944.

In 1956, the German Democratic Republic abolished paragraph 175 of the German penal code which outlawed homosexuality. In 1962, homosexual behaviour was decriminalized in Czechoslovakia, following the scientific research of Kurt Freund that included phallometry of gay men who appeared to have given up sexual relations with other men and established heterosexual marriages. Freund came to the conclusion that a homosexual orientation cannot be changed. However, the claim that phallometry on men was the only reason for the decriminalization of homosexual behaviour in Czechoslovakia is contradicted by the fact that it applied to women as well, as the notion of a male-specific fixity of sexual orientation as an argument for gay rights combined with the notion of female sexual plasticity is adverse to lesbian rights.

In 1972, Sweden became the first country in the world to allow people who were transgender by legislation to surgically change their sexual organs and provide free hormone replacement therapy.

In 1979, a number of people in Sweden called in sick with a case of being homosexual, in protest of homosexuality being classified as an illness. This was followed by an activist occupation of the main office of the National Board of Health and Welfare. Within a few months, Sweden became the first country in Europe from those that had previously defined homosexuality as an illness to remove it as such.

The American Psychiatric Association removed homosexuality from its list of mental disorders in 1973 with publication of its DSM II. Source: The American Psychiatric Association, and DSM II. Thus, the American Psychiatric Association took this step six years before a similar action was taken in Sweden.

In 1989, Denmark was the first country in Europe, and the world, to introduce registered partnerships for same-sex couples.

In 1991, Bulgaria became the first country in Europe to constitutionally ban same-sex marriage. Since then, thirteen countries have followed (Lithuania in 1992, Belarus and Moldova in 1994, Ukraine in 1996, Latvia and Serbia in 2006, Montenegro in 2007, Hungary in 2012, Croatia in 2013, Slovakia in 2014, Armenia in 2015, Georgia in 2018, and Russia in 2020).

In 2001, the Netherlands opened civil marriage for same-sex couples, making it the first country in the world to do so. Since then, 21 other European states have followed: Belgium in 2003, Spain in 2005, Norway and Sweden in 2009, Portugal and Iceland in 2010, Denmark in 2012, France in 2013, England and Wales in 2013, Scotland in 2014, Luxembourg and Ireland in 2015, Finland, Malta, and Germany in 2017, Austria in 2019, Northern Ireland in 2020, Switzerland in 2022, Slovenia in 2022, Andorra in 2023, Estonia and Greece in 2024, and Liechtenstein in 2025.

On 22 October 2009, the assembly of the Church of Sweden, voted strongly in favour of giving its blessing to homosexual couples, including the use of the term marriage, ("matrimony"). The new law was introduced on 1 November 2009. Under the Danish marriage law, ministers can refuse to carry out a same-sex ceremony, but the local bishop must arrange a replacement for their church building. In October 2015, the Church of Iceland voted to allow same-sex couples to marry in its churches. In 2015, the Church of Norway voted to allow same-sex marriages to take place in its churches. The decision was ratified at the annual conference on 11 April 2016. The church formally amended its marriage liturgy on 30 January 2017, replacing references to "bride and groom" with gender-neutral text. A male same-sex couple was immediately married in the church the moment the changes came into effect, on 1 February 2017.

== Recent developments ==
In the 2011 UN General Assembly declaration for LGBT rights, state parties were given a chance to express their support, opposition or abstention on the topic. A majority of the European countries expressed their support, and only Kazakhstan expressed its opposition. State parties that expressed abstention were Azerbaijan, Belarus, Russia, and Turkey.

Civil partnerships have been legal in Ireland since 2011. In 2013, the government held a constitutional convention which voted overwhelmingly in favour of amending the constitution in order to extend marriage rights to same-sex couples. On 22 May 2015, Irish citizens voted on whether to add the following amendment to the constitution: "Marriage may be contracted in accordance with law by two persons without distinction as to their sex". 62.1% of the electorate voted in favour of the amendment, making Ireland the first country worldwide to introduce same-sex marriage through a national referendum. Ireland's first same-sex marriage ceremonies took place in November 2015.

The Isle of Man has allowed civil partnerships since 2011, as well as Jersey in 2012. Both Crown Dependencies legalised same-sex marriage later since 22 July 2016 and since 1 July 2018, respectively.

Liechtenstein also legalised registered partnership by 68% of voters via a referendum in 2011.

On 1 January 2012, a new constitution of Hungary enacted by the government of Viktor Orbán, leader of the ruling Fidesz party, came into effect, restricting marriage to opposite-sex couples and containing no guarantees of protection from discrimination on account of sexual orientation.

In 2012, the United Kingdom government launched a public same-sex marriage consultation, intending to change the laws applying to England and Wales. Its Marriage Bill was signed into law on 17 July 2013. The Scottish government launched a similar consultation, aiming to legalise same-sex marriage by 2015. On 4 February 2014, the Scottish Parliament passed a bill to legalise same-sex marriages in Scotland as well as ending the "spousal veto" that would allow spouses to deny transgender partners the ability to change their legal gender. Same-sex marriage was extended to Northern Ireland on 21 October 2019 and the law came into effect on 13 January 2020.

In May 2013, France legalised same-sex marriage, with French president François Hollande signing a law authorising marriage and adoption by gay couples.

On 30 June 2013, Vladimir Putin, President of Russia, signed the Russian LGBT propaganda law into force, which was approved by the State Duma. The law makes distributing propaganda among minors in support of "non-traditional" sexual relationships a criminal offence.

On 1 December 2013, a referendum was held in Croatia to constitutionally define marriage as a union between a woman and a man. The vote passed, with 65.87% supporting the measure, and a turnout of 37.9%.

On 27 January 2014 in the Turkish Republic of Northern Cyprus, Turkish Cypriot deputies passed an amendment repealing a colonial-era law that punished homosexual acts with up to five years in prison by a new Criminal Code.

On 14 April 2014, the Parliament of Malta voted in favour of the Civil Union Act which recognises same-sex couples and permits them to adopt children. On the same day the Maltese parliament also voted in favour of a constitutional amendment to ban discrimination based on sexual orientation and gender identity.

On 4 June 2014, the Slovak parliament overwhelmingly approved a sitting social-democratic government sponsored Constitutional amendment to ban same-sex marriage, with 102 deputies for and 18 deputies against the legislation, fulfilling a 2/3 constitutional change requirement (minimum of 100 deputies out of 150 sitting MPs) for enacting this Constitutional amendment.

On 18 June 2014, the Parliament of Luxembourg approved a bill to legalise same-sex marriage and adoption. The law was published in the official gazette on 17 July and took effect 1 January 2015.

On 15 July 2014, Croatian Parliament passed the Life Partnership Act giving same-sex couples all rights that married couples have, except for adoption. However, the Act allows a parent's life partner to become the child's partner-guardian. Partner-guardianship as an institution similar to step-child adoption in rights and responsibilities, but it does not give parental status to the parent's life partner. Criteria for partner-guardianship and step-parent adoption for opposite-sex couples are the same. Also, regardless of partner-guardianship, a parent's life partner may attain partial parental responsibility over the child either via court or consensus among the parents and life partner, even full in some cases when the court decides that it is in the child's best interest.

In September 2014, a law went into effect in Denmark effectively dropping the former practice of requiring transgender persons to undergo arduous psychiatric evaluation and castration before being allowed legal gender change. By requiring nothing more than a statement of gender identity and subsequent confirmation of the request for gender change after a waiting period of 6 months, this means that anyone wishing their legal gender marker changed can do so with no expert-evaluation and few other formal restrictions. Meanwhile, Norwegian Health Minister Bent Høie has made promises that a similar law for Norway will be drafted soon. And on 18 March 2016, the Government introduced a bill to allow legal gender change without any form of psychiatric or psychological evaluation, diagnosis or any kind of medical intervention, by people aged at least 16. Minors aged between 6 and 16 also could have that possibility with parental consent. The bill was approved by a vote of 79–13 by Parliament on 6 June. It was promulgated on 17 June and took effect on 1 July 2016.

On 9 October 2014, the Parliament of Estonia passed the Cohabitation bill by a 40–38 vote. It was signed by President Toomas Hendrik Ilves that same day and took effect on 1 January 2016.

On 27 November 2014, the Parliament of Andorra passed a Civil Union bill, legalising also joint adoption for same-sex partners. On 24 December 2014, the bill was published in the official journal, following promulgation by co-prince François Hollande as signature of one of the two co-princes was needed. It took effect on 25 December 2014.

On 12 December 2014, the Parliament of Finland passed a same-sex marriage bill by a 101–90 vote. The law was signed by President Sauli Niinistö on 20 February 2015. In order that the provisions of the framework law would be fully implementable further legislation has to be passed. The law took effect on 1 March 2017.

In January 2015, the Parliament of North Macedonia voted to constitutionally define marriage as a union solely between a man and a woman. On 9 January, the parliamentary committee on constitutional issues approved a series of amendments, including the aforementioned limitation of marriage and the additional requirement of a two-thirds majority for any future regulation of marriage, family and civil unions (a requirement previously reserved only for issues such as sovereignty and territorial questions). On 20 January, the amendments were approved in parliament by 72 votes to 4. However, in order for these amendments to be added to the constitution, a final vote was required. This final parliamentary session was commenced on 26 January but never concluded, as the ruling coalition did not obtain the two-thirds majority required. The parliamentary session on the constitutional amendments was in recess until the end of 2015, thus the amendment failed.

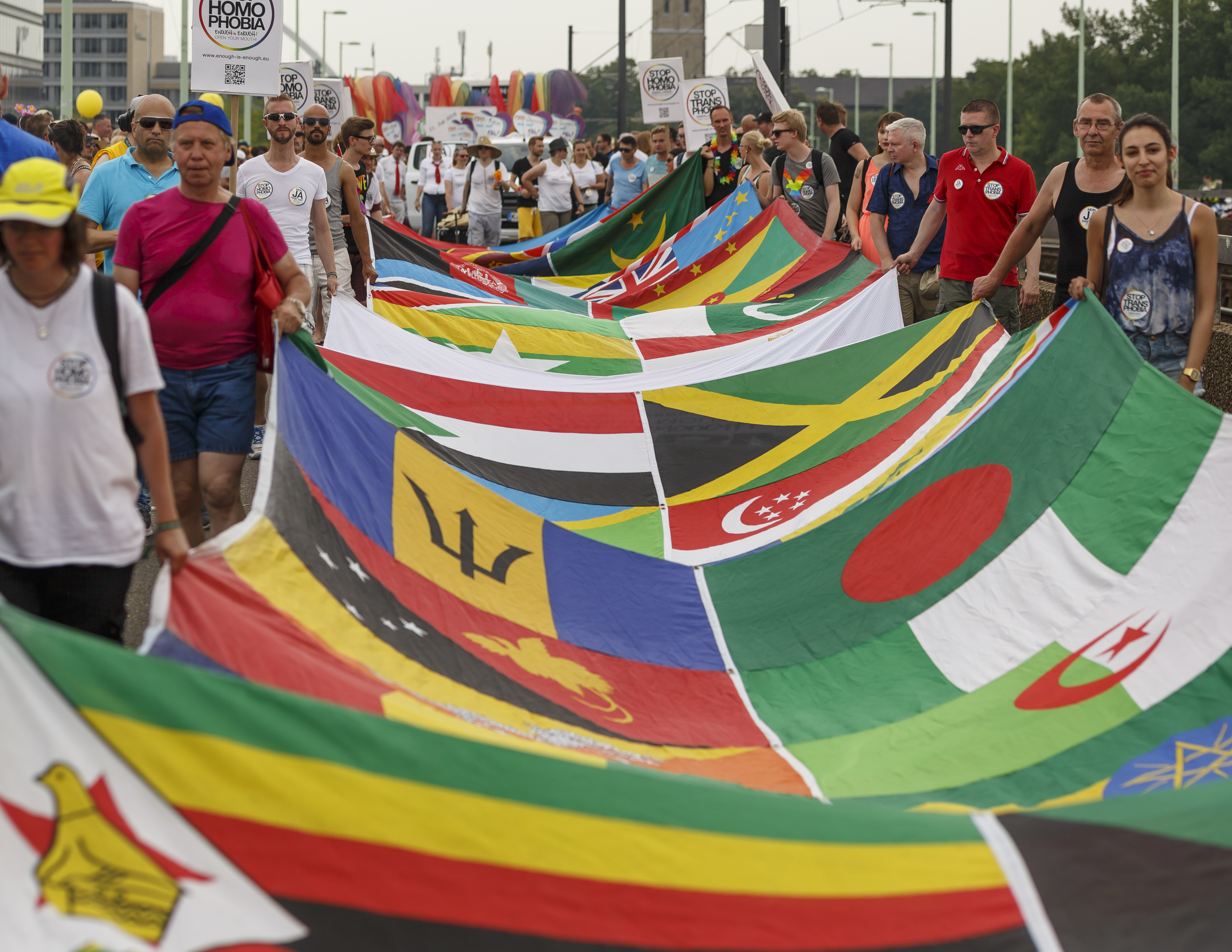
LGBT activists at Cologne Pride 2015 carrying a banner with the flags of 72 countries with laws against homosexuality

On 7 February 2015, Slovaks voted in a referendum to ban same-sex marriage and same-sex parental adoption. The result of the referendum was for enacting the ban proposals, with 95% and 92% votes for, respectively. However, the referendum was deemed invalid under referendum law because of a low turnout (below 50% requirement).

On 3 March 2015, the Parliament of Slovenia passed a same-sex marriage bill by a 51–28 vote. On 20 December 2015, Slovenians rejected the new same-sex marriage bill by a margin of 63% to 37%, due to low turnout. In July 2022, the Constitutional Court of Slovenia declared the law prohibiting same-sex marriage unconstitutional and ordered the Slovenian Parliament to amend it. The Parliament complied in October 2022, thereby legalizing same-sex marriage and joint adoption. A public poll conducted by the Office of the Principle of Equality showed that 72% of Slovenians supported the legalization.

In November 2015, the Parliament of Cyprus approved a bill which legalised civil unions for same-sex couples in a 39–12 vote. It took effect on 9 December 2015.

A bill to legalise civil unions for same-sex couples in Greece was approved in December 2015 by its Parliament in a 194–55 vote. The law was signed by the President and took effect on 24 December 2015.

On 29 April 2016, the Parliament of the Faroe Islands, a Danish dependency, voted to extend Danish same-sex marriage legislation to the territory, excluding the possibility to be legally wed in a religious ceremony. The Danish Parliament still had to approve the exclusion of religious marriages for the Faroe Islands, unlike in Denmark where churches can perform marriages between persons of the same sex. The law within the Faroe Islands went into effect on 1 July 2017, after the ratification formality by both the Danish Parliament and royal assent.

A bill to legalise civil unions for same-sex couples in Italy was approved on 11 May 2016 by the Parliament of Italy. The law was signed by the President on 20 May 2016. It was published in the Official Gazette on 21 May and therefore entered into force on 5 June 2016.

On 21 September 2016, the States of Guernsey approved the bill to legalize same-sex marriage, in a 33–5 vote. It received Royal Assent on 14 December 2016. The law went into effect on 1 July 2017.

On 26 October 2016, the Gibraltar Parliament unanimously approved a bill to allow same-sex marriage by a vote of 15–0. It received Royal Assent 1 November 2016. The law went into effect on 15 December 2016.

On 31 January 2017, the Supreme Court of Cassation in Italy refused, on procedural grounds, to rescind a lower judgment recognising a marriage between two French women (one of these had the right to claim Italian citizenship iure sanguinis), officiated in the French region of Nord-Pas-de-Calais. This is the first time a same-sex marriage is admitted in Italy, but the judgment does not imply that this will necessarily be the case in general terms.

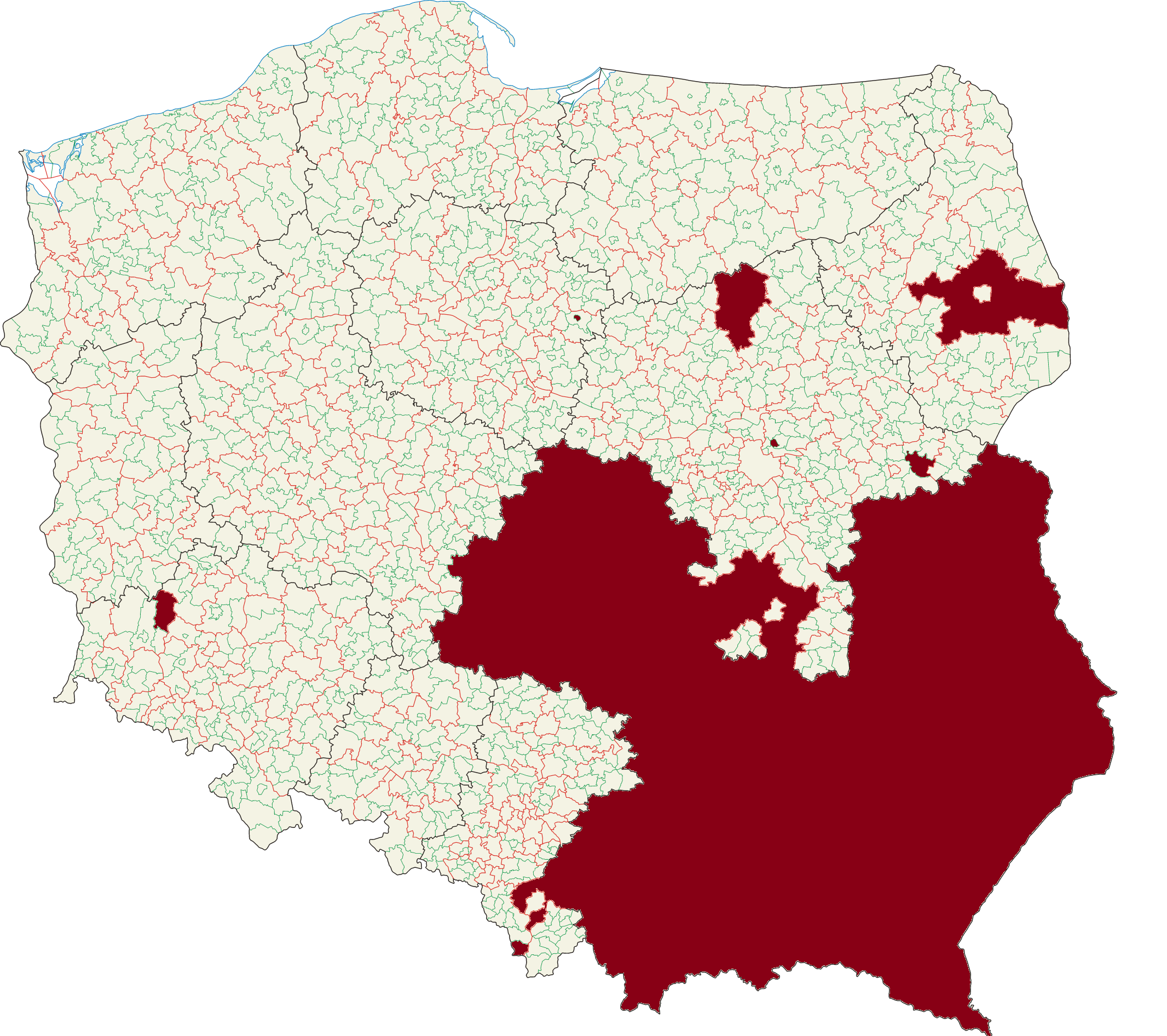
LGBT-free zones in Poland (red) in January 2020.

Within July 2017, both the Parliaments of Germany and Malta approved bills to allow same-sex marriage. The Presidents of both countries signed the bills into law. The same-sex marriage laws within Malta went into effect on 1 September 2017 and the same-sex marriage laws within Germany went into effect on 1 October 2017.

In October 2017, the Parliamentary Assembly of the Council of Europe adopted the first intersex-specific resolution of its kind from a European intergovernmental institution, after 33 members voted in favour. The resolution called for intersex peoples right to bodily autonomy and physical integrity by calling for prohibition of "medically unnecessary sex-"normalising" surgery, sterilisation and other treatments practised on intersex children without their informed consent" It recommends the committee of ministers to bring the resolution to the attention of their governments, the need for increased psychosocial support, and calls for policymakers to "ensure that anti-discrimination legislation effectively applies to and protects intersex people."

On 5 December 2017, the Constitutional Court of Austria struck down the ban on same-sex marriage as unconstitutional. Same-sex marriage became legal on 1 January 2019.

In late 2018, San Marino parliament voted to legalise civil unions with stepchild adoption rights. The law to permit civil unions became fully operational on 11 February 2019, following a number of further legal and administrative changes.

On 18 December 2019, the European Parliament voted, 463 to 107, to condemn the more than 80 LGBT-free zones in Poland.

In December 2020, Hungary explicitly legally banned adoption for same-sex couples within its constitution, and in June 2021 the Hungarian parliament approved a law prohibiting the showing of "any content portraying or promoting sex reassignment or homosexuality" to minors, similar to the Russian "anti-gay propaganda" law. Sixteen EU member states condemned the law, calling it a breach of the Charter of Fundamental Rights of the European Union. In 2025, Hungary banned Pride marches as the only EU nation to do so.

On 26 September 2021, nearly two thirds of Swiss voters agreed to legalise civil marriage and the right to adopt children for same-sex couples in an optional referendum, after the National Council and the Council of States had both approved the aforementioned legalisations on 18 December 2020. The new law has taken effect on 1 July 2022.

On 20 June 2023, the Parliament of Estonia approved a bill to allow same-sex marriage by a vote of 55–34. It took effect on 1 January 2024.

On 15 February 2024, the Greek Parliament voted in favour of legalizing same-sex marriage by a margin of 176–76.

Since July 1, 2024, Latvia implemented a registered partnership law that has the same rights and obligations as married couples - with the exception of the title of marriage, any adoption or inheritance rights and obligations.

== Public opinion around Europe ==
2019 Pew Research Center Poll: Percentage of responders who said that homosexuality should be accepted by society: 0–10% 11–20% 21–30% 31–40% 41–50% 51–60% 61–70% 71–80% 81–90% 91–100% No data

Eurobarometer 2023: % of people in each country who agree with the statement that "Gay, lesbian and bisexual people should have the same rights as heterosexual people (marriage, adoption, parental rights)."
Country	Percentage
Netherlands	95%
Sweden	94%
Denmark	92%
Spain	87%
Ireland	84%
Germany	81%
Luxembourg	81%
Portugal	79%
France	78%
Belgium	77%
Finland	75%
European Union	69%
Malta	68%
Italy	63%
Austria	59%
Czechia	54%
Cyprus	45%
Greece	44%
Hungary	44%
Slovenia	42%
Poland	41%
Latvia	39%
Estonia	37%
Croatia	35%
Slovakia	35%
Lithuania	29%
Romania	27%
Bulgaria	21%

In a 2002 Pew Global Attitudes Project surveyed by the Pew Research Center, showed majorities in every Western European nation said homosexuality should be accepted by society, while most Russians, Poles and Ukrainians disagreed. According to pollster Gallup Europe in 2003, women, younger generations, and the highly educated are more likely to support same-sex marriage and adoption rights for gay people than other demographics.

A Eurobarometer in 2006 surveying up to 30,000 people from each European Union country, showed split opinion around the then 27 member states on the issue of same-sex marriage. The majority of support came from the Netherlands (82%), Sweden (71%), Denmark (69%), Belgium (62%), Luxembourg (58%), Spain (56%), Finland (54%), Germany (52%) and the Czech Republic (52%). All other countries within the EU had below 50% support; with Romania (11%), Latvia (12%), Cyprus (14%), Bulgaria (15%), Greece (15%), Lithuania (17%), Poland (17%), Hungary (18%) and Malta (18%) at the other end of the list. Same-sex adoption had majority support from only two countries: Netherlands at 69% and Sweden at 51% and the least support from Poland and Malta on 7%, respectively.

A more recent survey carried out in October 2008 by The Observer affirmed that a small majority of Britons—55%—support same-sex marriage. A 2013 poll shows that the majority of the Irish public support same-sex marriage and adoption, 73% and 60%, respectively. France has support for same-sex marriage at 62%, while support among Russians stands at 21% as of 2021. Italy has support for the 'Civil Partnership Law' between people of the same gender at 45% with 47% opposed. In 2009 58.9% of Italians supported civil unions, while a 40.4% minority supported same-sex marriage. In 2010, 63.9% of Greeks supported same-sex partnerships, while a 38.5% minority supported same-sex marriage. In 2012 a poll by MaltaToday showed that 41% of Maltese supported same-sex marriage, with support increasing to 60% amongst the 18–35 age group. In a 2013 opinion poll conducted by CBOS, 65% of Poles were against same-sex civil unions, 72% of Poles were against same-sex marriage, 88% were against adoption by same-sex couples, and 68% were against lesbian, gay, or bisexual people publicly showing their way of life. In Croatia, a poll from November 2013 revealed that 59% of Croats think that marriage should be constitutionally defined as a union between a man and a woman, while 31% do not agree with the idea. A CBOS opinion poll from February 2014 found that 70% of Poles believe same-sex sexual activity is morally unacceptable, while only 22% believed it is morally acceptable.

Public support for same-sex marriage from EU member states as measured from a 2015 poll is the greatest in the Netherlands (91%), Sweden (90%), Denmark (87%), Spain (84%), Ireland (80%), Belgium (77%), Luxembourg (75%), the United Kingdom (71%) and France (71%). In recent years, support has risen most significantly in Malta, from 18% in 2006 to 65% in 2015 and in Ireland from 41% in 2006 to 80% in 2015.

After the approval of same-sex marriage in Portugal in January 2010, 52% of the Portuguese population stated that they were in favor of the legislation. In 2008, 58% of the Norwegian voters supported same-sex marriage, which was introduced in the same year, and 31 percent were against it. In January 2013, 54.1% of Italians respondents supported same-sex marriage. In a late January 2013 survey, 77.2% of Italians respondents supported the recognition of same-sex unions.

In Greece support more than tripled between 2006 and 2017. In 2006 15% responded that they agreed with same-sex marriages being allowed throughout Europe. In 2017 according to a survey 50.04% of Greeks agreed with gay marriage. A more recent survey in 2020 showed that 56% of the Greek population accept gay marriage.

In Ireland, a 2008 survey revealed 84% of people supported civil unions for same-sex couples (and 58% for same-sex marriage), while a 2010 survey showed 67% supported same-sex marriage by 2012 this figure had risen to 73% in support. On 22 May 2015, 62.1% of the electorate voted to enshrine same-sex marriage in the Irish constitution as equal to heterosexual marriage.

A March 2013 survey by Taloustutkimus found that 58% of Finns supported same-sex marriage.

In Croatia, a poll conducted in November 2013 revealed that 59% of Croats think that marriage should be constitutionally defined as a union between a man and a woman, while 31% do not agree with the idea.

In Poland a 2013 public poll revealed that 70% of Poles reject the idea of registered partnerships. Another survey in February 2013 revealed that 55% were against and 38% of Poles support the idea of registered partnerships for same-sex couples.

In the European Union, support tends to be the lowest in Bulgaria, Latvia, Hungary, Romania, Slovakia, and Lithuania. The average percentage of support for same-sex marriage in the European Union as of 2006 when it had 25 members was 44%, which had descended from a previous percentage of 53%. The change was caused by more socially conservative nations joining the EU. In 2015, with 28 members, average support was at 61%.

A 2015 NDI public opinion poll shows that only 10% of the population in the Balkans (Serbia, Bosnia and Herzegovina, Albania, Kosovo, Montenegro and North Macedonia) believe LGBTI marriages are acceptable, in contrast to 88% who think they're unacceptable.

=== Same-sex marriage ===
Indicates the country/territory has legalised same-sex marriage nationwide
Indicates that same-sex marriage is legal in certain parts of the country
Indicates that the country has civil unions or registered partnerships
Indicates that the country has pending civil union or registered partnership legislation
Indicates that the country has pending same-sex marriage legislation

Country	Pollster	Year	For (Note: Because some polls do not report 'neither', those that do are listed with simple yes/no percentages in parentheses, so their figures can be compared.)	Against	Neither (Note: Comprises: Neutral; Don't know; No answer; Other; Refused.)	Margin of error	Source
Albania	IPSOS	2023	26%	73% (74%)	1%		
Andorra	Institut d'Estudis Andorrans	2013	70% (79%)	19% (21%)	11%		
Armenia	Pew Research Center	2015	3% (3%)	96% (97%)	1%	±3%	
Austria	Eurobarometer	2023	65%	30%	5%		
Belarus	Pew Research Center	2015	16% (16%)	81% (84%)	3%	±4%	
Belgium	Ipsos	2024	69%	19% [9% support some rights]	12% not sure	±5%	
Belgium	Eurobarometer	2023	79%	19%	2% not sure		
Bosnia and Herzegovina	IPSOS	2023	26% (27%)	71% (73%)	3%		
Bulgaria	Eurobarometer	2023	17%	75%	8%		
Croatia	Eurobarometer	2023	42%	51%	7%		
Cyprus	Eurobarometer	2023	50%	44%	6%		
Czech Republic	Eurobarometer	2023	60%	34%	6%		
Denmark	Eurobarometer	2023	93%	5%	2%		
Estonia	Eurobarometer	2023	41%	51%	8%		
Finland	Eurobarometer	2023	76%	18%	6%		
France	Ipsos	2024	62%	26% [16% support some rights]	12% not sure	±3.5%	
France	Pew Research Center	2023	82%	14%	4%	±3.6%	
France	Eurobarometer	2023	79%	14	7%		
(Georgia (country)) Georgia	Women's Initiatives Supporting Group	2021	10% (12%)	75% (88%)	15%		
Germany	Ipsos	2024	73%	18% [10% support some rights]	12% not sure	±3.5%	
Germany	Pew Research Center	2023	80%	19%	1%	±3.6%	
Germany	Eurobarometer	2023	84%	13%	3%		
Greece	Pew Research Center	2023	48% (49%)	49% (51%)	3%	±3.6%	
Greece	Eurobarometer	2023	57% (59%)	40% (41%)	3%		
Hungary	Medián	2026	68%	30%	2%		
Hungary	Ipsos	2024	44%	35% [18% support some rights]	21% not sure	±5%	
Hungary	Pew Research Center	2023	31% (33%)	64% (67%)	5%	±3.6%	
Hungary	Eurobarometer	2023	42%	52%	6%		
Iceland	Gallup	2006	89%	11%	–		
(Republic of Ireland) Ireland	Ipsos	2024	68%	21% [8% support some rights]	10%	±5% (Note: [+ more urban/educated than representative])	
(Republic of Ireland) Ireland	Eurobarometer	2023	86%	9%	5%		
Italy	Ipsos	2024	58%	29% [19% support some rights]	12% not sure	±3.5%	
Italy	Pew Research Center	2023	73% (75%)	25%	2%	±3.6%	
Italy	Eurobarometer	2023	69%	27%	4%		
Kazakhstan	Pew Research Center	2016	7% (7%)	89% (93%)	4%		
Kosovo	IPSOS	2023	20% (21%)	77% (79%)	3%		
Latvia	Eurobarometer	2023	36%	59%	5%		
Liechtenstein	Liechtenstein Institut	2021	72%	28%	0%		
Lithuania	Eurobarometer	2023	39%	55%	6%		
Luxembourg	Eurobarometer	2023	84%	13%	3%		
Malta	Eurobarometer	2023	74%	24%	2%		
Moldova	Europa Liberă Moldova	2022	14%	86%			
Montenegro	IPSOS	2023	36% (37%)	61% (63%)	3%		
Netherlands	Ipsos	2024	77%	15% [8% support some rights]	8% not sure	±5%	
Netherlands	Pew Research Center	2023	89% (90%)	10%	1%	±3.6%	
Netherlands	Eurobarometer	2023	94%	5%	2%		
North Macedonia	IPSOS	2023	20% (21%)	78% (80%)	2%		
Norway	Pew Research Center	2017	72% (79%)	19% (21%)	9%		
Poland	Ipsos	2024	39%	48% [28% support some rights]	13%	±5%	
Poland	Pew Research Center	2023	41% (43%)	54% (57%)	5%	±3.6%	
Poland	United Surveys by IBRiS	2024	50% (55%)	41% (45%)	9%		
Poland	Eurobarometer	2023	50%	45%	5%		
Portugal	Ipsos	2023	80% (84%)	15% [11% support some rights] (16%)	5%		
Portugal	Eurobarometer	2023	81%	14%	5%		
Romania	Ipsos	2023	25% (30%)	59% [26% support some rights] (70%)	17%	±3.5%	
Romania	Eurobarometer	2023	25%	69%	6%		
Russia	Ipsos	2021	17% (21%)	64% [12% support some rights] (79%)	20% not sure	±4.8%	
Russia	FOM	2019	7% (8%)	85% (92%)	8%	±3.6%	
Serbia	IPSOS	2023	24% (25%)	73% (75%)	3%		
Slovakia	Focus	2024	36% (38%)	60% (62%)	4%		
Slovakia	Eurobarometer	2023	37%	56%	7%		
Slovenia	Eurobarometer	2023	62% (64%)	37% (36%)	2%		
Spain	Ipsos	2024	73%	19% [13% support some rights]	9% not sure	±3.5%	
Spain	Pew Research Center	2023	87% (90%)	10%	3%	±3.6%	
Spain	Eurobarometer	2023	88%	9%	3%		
Sweden	Ipsos	2024	78%	15% [8% support some rights]	7% not sure	±5%	
Sweden	Pew Research Center	2023	92% (94%)	6%	2%	±3.6%	
Sweden	Eurobarometer	2023	94%	5%	1%		
Switzerland	Ipsos	2023	54% (61%)	34% [16% support some rights] (39%)	13% not sure	±3.5%	
Turkey	Ipsos	2024	18%	52% [19% support some rights]	30% not sure	±5%	
Ukraine	Kyiv International Institute of Sociology	2023	44% (55%)	36% (45%)	20%	±2.2%	
Ukraine	Rating	2023	37% (47%)	42% (53%)	22%	±1.5%	
United Kingdom	YouGov	2023	77% (84%)	15% (16%)	8%		
United Kingdom	Ipsos	2024	66%	24% [11% support some rights]	10% not sure	±3.5%	
United Kingdom	Pew Research Center	2023	74% (77%)	22% (23%)	4%	±3.6%	

Opinion polls for same-sex marriage by dependent territory
Country	Pollster	Year	For	Against	Neutral	Source
Faroe Islands	Spyr.fo	2019	71.1%	12.6%	16.7%	
Gibraltar	Inter-Ministerial Committee Consultation	2015	63%	37%	0%	
Northern Ireland	YouGov	2019	55%	-	-	

=== Adoption ===
Indicates the country/territory has legalized same-sex adoption nationwide
Indicates that same-sex adoption is legal in certain parts of the country
Indicates that the country has step-child adoption or partner-guardianship

Opinion polls for same-sex adoption in Europe
Country	Pollster	Year	For	Against	Don't know/neutral/no answer/other
Austria	Eurobarometer	2023	65%	30%	5%
Belgium	Ipsos	2025	70%	23%	7%
Bulgaria	Eurobarometer	2006	12%	68%	20%
Croatia	Promocija Plus	2025	28%	52%	20%
Cyprus	Eurobarometer	2006	10%	86%	4%
Czech Republic	CVVM	2019	47%	47%	6%
Denmark	Pew Research Center	2017	75%	-	-
Estonia	HumanrightsEE	2023	47%	44%	9%
Finland	Taloustutkimus	2013	51%	42%	7%
France	Ipsos	2025	66%	26%	8%
Germany	Ipsos	2025	74%	19%	7%
Greece	KAPA Research	2023	53%	41%	6%
Hungary	Ipsos	2025	62%	39%	1%
Ireland	Red C Poll	2011	60%	-	-
Italy	Eurispes	2023	50.4%	49.6%	0%
Latvia	SKDS	2023	27%	23%	46%
Lithuania	Eurobarometer	2006	12%	82%	6%
Luxembourg	Politmonitor	2013	55%	44%	1%
Malta	Misco	2014	20%	80%	-
Netherlands	Ipsos	2025	76%	20%	4%
Norway	YouGov	2012	54%	34%	12%
Poland	Ipsos	2025	32%	66%	2%
Portugal	Pew Research Center	2017	59%	28%	13%
Romania	Eurobarometer	2006	8%	82%	10%
Russia	Ipsos	2021	23%	67%	10%
Serbia	Civil Rights Defenders	2020	22.5%	-	-
Slovakia	Eurobarometer	2006	12%	84%	4%
Slovenia	Delo Stik	2015	38%	55%	7%
Spain	Ipsos	2025	73%	20%	7%
Sweden	Ipsos	2025	79%	16%	5%
Switzerland	Pink Cross	2020	67%	30%	3%
Ukraine	Kyiv International Institute of Sociology	2023	30%	48%	22%
United Kingdom	Ipsos	2021	72%	19%	9%

== Legislation by country or territory ==
=== European Union ===
LGBT rights in	Same-sex sexual activity	Recognition of same-sex unions	Same-sex marriage	Adoption by same-sex couples	LGBT people allowed to serve openly in military	Anti-discrimination laws concerning sexual orientation	Laws concerning gender identity/expression
member states of the European Union	Yes Legal in all 27 member states	Yes / No Recognized in 25/27 member states	Yes / No Legal in 16/27 member states	Yes / No Stepchild adoption legal in 19/27 member states; joint adoption legal in 17/27 member states	Yes Legal in all member states	Yes Membership requires a state to ban discrimination based on person's sexual orientation in employment. 4/27 states ban some anti-gay discrimination. 23/27 states ban all anti-gay discrimination	Yes / No Legal in 24/27 member states

=== Central Europe ===
LGBT rights in	Same-sex sexual activity	Recognition of same-sex unions	Same-sex marriage	Adoption by same-sex couples	LGBT people allowed to serve openly in military	Anti-discrimination laws concerning sexual orientation	Laws concerning gender identity/expression
Austria	Yes Legal since 1971; equal age of consent since 2002 + UN decl. sign.	Yes Registered partnerships since 2010	Yes Legal since 2019	Yes Stepchild adoption since 2013; joint adoption since 2016	Yes Includes transgender people	Yes Bans all anti-gay discrimination	Yes Transgender people allowed to change gender without undergoing surgery
Czech Republic	Yes Legal since 1962 (As part of Czechoslovakia); equal age of consent since 1990 + UN decl. sign.	Yes Registered partnerships since 2006	No	Yes / No Stepchild adoption since 2025	Yes Includes transgender people	Yes Bans all anti-gay discrimination	Yes Transgender people allowed to change gender without undergoing surgery
Germany	Yes Legal in East Germany since 1968; Legal in West Germany since 1969; equal age of consent since 1988 in East Germany and since 1994 in unified Germany + UN decl. sign.	Yes Registered life partnerships from 2001 to 2017 (existing partnerships and new foreign partnerships still recognised)	Yes Legal since 2017	Yes Stepchild adoption since 2005; successive adoption since 2013; joint adoption legal since 2017	Yes Includes transgender people	Yes Bans all anti-gay discrimination	Yes Gender self-determination enacted and implemented on a birth certificate since 2024.
Hungary	Yes Legal since 1962; equal age of consent since 2002 + UN decl. sign.	Yes Registered partnerships since 2009	No Constitutional ban since 2012	No Constitutional ban since 2020	Yes	Yes Bans all anti-gay discrimination	Yes Forbids discrimination based on gender identity No Transgender people are not allowed to change gender since 2020.
Liechtenstein	Yes Legal since 1989; equal age of consent since 2001 + UN decl. sign.	Yes Registered partnerships since 2011	Yes Legal since 2025	Yes Stepchild adoption since 2022; joint adoption since 2023	Has no military	Yes Bans all anti-gay discrimination	No Gender change is not legal
Poland	Yes Always legal in Polish legislation (Russian Empire, Kingdom of Prussia and Austria-Hungary Empire laws criminalizing same-sex intercourse were in force to 1932; German laws criminalizing same-sex intercourse were in force from 1939 to 1945 during Nazi Germany occupation) + UN decl. sign.	No	No / Yes Constitutional ban since 1997 (Article 18 of the Constitution is generally interpreted as limiting marriage to opposite-sex couples) (Note: In January 2019, a lower administrative court in Warsaw ruled that the language in Article 18 of the Constitution does not explicitly ban same-sex marriage.) Marriages performed in other EU countries recognised under EU Law	No LGBT individuals may adopt, but not same-sex couples	Yes	Yes Bans some anti-gay discrimination	Yes Transgender people allowed to change gender. No provisions for nonbinary people.
Slovakia	Yes Legal since 1962 (As part of Czechoslovakia); equal age of consent since 1990 + UN decl. sign.	No	No Constitutional ban since 2014	No By law adoption for LGBT individuals and couples is prohibited since 2025	Yes	Yes Bans all anti-gay discrimination	No By law legal gender change not recognised since 2025 by a constitutional amendment, de facto since 2022.
Slovenia	Yes Legal since 1977 (As part of Yugoslavia); equal age of consent since 1990 + UN decl. sign.	Yes Registered cohabitation since 2006; Registered partnerships since 2017	Yes Legal since 2022	Yes Stepchild adoption since 2011; joint adoption since 2022	Yes	Yes Bans all anti-gay discrimination	Yes Gender change is legal
Switzerland	Yes Legal nationwide since 1942; Legal in the cantons of Geneva (as part of France), Ticino, Valais, and Vaud since 1798; equal age of consent since 1990 + UN decl. sign.	Yes Registered partnerships in Geneva (2001), Zürich (2003), Neuchâtel (2004) and Fribourg (2005); Nationwide from 2007 until 2022 (superseded by marriage)	Yes Legal since 2022	Yes Stepchild adoption since 2018; joint adoption since 2022	Yes Includes transgender people	Yes Bans all anti-gay discrimination	Yes Change of legal sex by simple declaration (self-determination +16 yo); surgery/sterilisation not required.

=== Eastern Europe ===
LGBT rights in	Same-sex sexual activity	Recognition of same-sex unions	Same-sex marriage	Adoption by same-sex couples	LGBT people allowed to serve openly in military	Anti-discrimination laws concerning sexual orientation	Laws concerning gender identity/expression
Abkhazia (Disputed territory)	Yes Legal after 1991	No	No	No		No	
Armenia	Yes Legal since 2003 + UN decl. sign.	No	No Constitutional ban since 2015	No	No	No	No
Azerbaijan	Yes Legal since 2000	No	No	No	No	No	No
Belarus	Yes Legal since 1994	No	No Constitutional ban since 1994	No	No / Yes Banned from military service during peacetime, but during wartime homosexuals are permitted to enlist as partially able	No	Yes / No (Highly bureaucratic, lengthy two-stage process: deciding body meets only twice a year; permission for medical or surgical interventions only at the second stage. Flaw in passport conversion whereby passport number may reveal former designation of sex to agencies.)
(Georgia (country)) Georgia	Yes Legal since 2000 + UN decl. sign.	No	No Constitutional ban since 2018	No		Yes Bans all anti-gay discrimination	No
Kazakhstan	Yes Legal since 1998	No	No	No	Yes	No	Yes Requires sex reassignment surgery, sterilization, hormone therapy and medical examinations
Moldova	Yes Legal since 1995 + UN decl. sign.	No	No Constitutional ban since 1994	No	Yes	Yes Bans all anti-gay discrimination	Yes Forbids discrimination based on gender identity. Yes / No (Sterilization is technically not required by law but the absence of a concrete legal framework regarding gender identity forces all individuals seeking legal gender change to go through a lengthy and highly bureaucratic process to seek recognition through the court system on an individual basis with mixed results often depending on each individual judge.)
Russia	Yes Male legal nationwide since 1993; Female always legal (de-facto illegal in Chechnya)	No	No Constitution limits marriage to opposite-sex couples since 2020	No	Yes	No	No Gender change has not been legal since 2023
South Ossetia (Disputed territory)	Yes Legal after 1991	No	No	No		No	
Transnistria (Disputed territory)	Yes Legal since 2002	No	No	No		No	
Ukraine	Yes Legal since 1991 + UN decl. sign.	Yes / No Establishment of the fact of cohabitation as a family (de facto marital relationship) by court order since 2026	No Constitutional ban since 1996	No LGBT individuals may adopt, but not same-sex couples	Yes	Yes Bans some anti-gay discrimination	Yes No longer requires sterilisation or surgery for change since 2016

=== Northern Europe ===
LGBT rights in	Same-sex sexual activity	Recognition of same-sex unions	Same-sex marriage	Adoption by same-sex couples	LGBT people allowed to serve openly in military	Anti-discrimination laws concerning sexual orientation	Laws concerning gender identity/expression
Denmark	Yes Legal since 1933; equal age of consent since 1973 + UN decl. sign.	Yes Registered partnerships from 1989 to 2012 (existing partnerships are still recognised)	Yes Legal since 2012	Yes Stepchild adoption since 1999; joint adoption since 2010	Yes Includes transgender people	Yes Bans all anti-gay discrimination	Yes Legal gender change and recognition possible without surgery or hormone therapy
Estonia	Yes Legal since 1992, legal 1935-1940, never criminalised between women; equal age of consent since 2002 + UN decl. sign.	Yes Cohabitation agreement since 2016	Yes Legal since 2024	Yes Stepchild adoption since 2016; joint adoption since 2024	Yes Includes transgender people	Yes Bans all anti-gay discrimination	Yes Gender reassignment legal; surgery not required
Faroe Islands (Autonomous Territory within the Kingdom of Denmark)	Yes Legal since 1933; equal age of consent since 1977 + UN decl. sign.	Yes	Yes Legal since 2017	Yes Legal since 2017	Yes The Kingdom of Denmark responsible for defence	Yes Bans some anti-gay discrimination	No
Finland (includes Åland)	Yes Legal since 1971; equal age of consent since 1999 + UN decl. sign.	Yes Registered partnerships from 2002 to 2017 (existing partnerships are still recognised)	Yes Legal since 2017	Yes Stepchild adoption since 2009; joint adoption since 2017	Yes Includes transgender people	Yes Bans all anti-gay discrimination	Yes Since 2023, by way of self-determination.
Iceland	Yes Legal since 1940; equal age of consent since 1992 (As part of Denmark) + UN decl. sign.	Yes Registered cohabitation since 2006; Registered partnerships from 1996 to 2010 (existing partnerships are still recognised)	Yes Legal since 2010	Yes Legal since 2006	No standing army	Yes Bans all anti-gay discrimination	Yes Documents can be amended to the recognised gender, sterilisation not required
Latvia	Yes Legal since 1992 + UN decl. sign.	Yes Registered partnerships since 2024	No Constitutional ban since 2006	No LGBT individuals may adopt, but not same-sex couples, incl. stepchild adoption	Yes	Yes Bans some anti-gay discrimination	Yes Legal change allowed but requires "full" transition and doctor's or court's approval. Sterilization required.
Lithuania	Yes Legal since 1993 + UN decl. sign.	Yes Registered partnerships admitted by the judiciary since 2025	No Constitutional ban since 1992	Yes / No Stepchild adoption admitted by the judiciary since 2024	Yes	Yes Bans all anti-gay discrimination	Yes Since 2022, gender change on legal documents permitted without surgery and no non-binary option available.
Norway (includes Svalbard and Jan Mayen)	Yes Legal since 1972 + UN decl. sign.	Yes Registered partnerships from 1993 to 2009 (existing partnerships are still recognised)	Yes Legal since 2009	Yes Stepchild adoption since 2002; joint adoption since 2009	Yes Includes transgender people	Yes Bans all anti-gay discrimination	Yes All documents can be amended to the recognised gender
Sweden	Yes Legal since 1944; equal age of consent since 1972 + UN decl. sign.	Yes Registered partnerships from 1995 to 2009 (existing partnerships are still recognised)	Yes Legal since 2009	Yes Legal since 2003	Yes Includes transgender people	Yes Bans all anti-gay discrimination	Yes First country within the world in 1972, to allow gender reassignment procedures for individuals. Since July 1, 2025 by “self-determination” for individuals to change gender.

=== Southern Europe ===
LGBT rights in	Same-sex sexual activity	Recognition of same-sex unions	Same-sex marriage	Adoption by same-sex couples	LGBT people allowed to serve openly in military	Anti-discrimination laws concerning sexual orientation	Laws concerning gender identity/expression
Akrotiri and Dhekelia (Overseas Territory of the United Kingdom)	Yes Legal since 2000; equal age of consent since 2003 + UN decl. sign.	Yes Since 2005, for members of the British Armed Forces	Yes Since 2014, for members of the British Armed Forces		Yes UK responsible for defence	Yes Bans some anti-gay discrimination	
Albania	Yes Legal since 1995 + UN decl. sign.	No	No	No	Yes	Yes Bans all anti-gay discrimination	No legal recognition
Andorra	Yes Legal since 1990 + UN decl. sign.	Yes Stable unions since 2005; Civil unions from 2014–2023, replaced by civil marriage	Yes Legal since 2023	Yes Legal since 2014	Has no military	Yes Bans all anti-gay discrimination	Yes Since 2023, without SRS and sterilization - but with a mandatory 2-year waiting period.
Bosnia and Herzegovina	Yes Legal since 1996 in the Federation of Bosnia and Herzegovina, in Republika Srpska since 1998, and in Brčko District since 2003 + UN decl. sign.	No	No	No	Yes	Yes Bans all anti-gay discrimination	Yes Requires surgery for change
Bulgaria	Yes Legal since 1968; equal age of consent since 2002 + UN decl. sign.	No	No Constitutional ban since 1991	No LGBT individuals may adopt, but not same-sex couples	Yes	Yes Bans all anti-gay discrimination	Yes Forbids discrimination based on gender identity. No Transgender people are not allowed to change gender since 2017.
Croatia	Yes Legal since 1977 (As part of Yugoslavia); equal age of consent since 1998 + UN decl. sign.	Yes Unregistered cohabitation since 2003 Life partnerships since 2014	No Constitutional ban since 2013	Yes Legal since 2022	Yes	Yes Bans all anti-gay discrimination	Yes Act on the elimination of discrimination bans all discrimination based on both gender identity and gender expression. Gender change is regulated by special policy issued by Ministry of Health.
Cyprus	Yes Legal since 1998; equal age of consent since 2002 + UN decl. sign.	Yes Civil cohabitation since 2015	No	No	Yes	Yes Bans some anti-gay discrimination	Yes Forbids some discrimination based on gender identity. Gender change not legal.
Gibraltar (Overseas Territory of the United Kingdom)	Yes Legal since 1993; equal age of consent since 2012 + UN decl. sign.	Yes Civil partnerships since 2014	Yes Legal since 2016	Yes Legal since 2014	Yes UK responsible for defence	Yes Bans all anti-gay discrimination	Yes Forbids discrimination on the grounds of gender reassignment No Gender change is not legal
Greece	Yes Legal since 1951; equal age of consent since 2015 + UN decl. sign.	Yes Cohabitation agreements since 2015	Yes Legal since 2024	Yes Legal since 2024	Yes	Yes Bans all anti-gay discrimination	Yes Under the Legal Gender Recognition Act 2017
Italy	Yes Legal since 1890 + UN decl. sign.	Yes Civil unions since 2016	No In 2018 the Supreme Court ruled that same-sex marriages performed abroad must be registered as civil unions. (Proposed)	Yes / No Stepchild adoption admitted by the Court of Cassation since 2016	Yes	Yes Bans some anti-gay discrimination	Yes Legal recognition and documents can be amended to the recognised gender, sterilisation not required
Kosovo	Yes Legal since 1994 (as part of Yugoslavia); equal age of consent since 2004	No	No	No LGBT individuals may adopt, but not same-sex couples	Yes	Yes Bans all anti-gay discrimination	Yes Forbids discrimination based on gender identity. No legal recognition
Malta	Yes Legal since 1973 + UN decl. sign.	Yes Civil unions since 2014	Yes Legal since 2017	Yes Legal since 2014	Yes	Yes Bans all anti-gay discrimination Pathologization or attempted treatment of sexual orientation by mental health professionals illegal since 2016	Yes Transgender people allowed to change gender; surgery not required since 2015
Montenegro	Yes Legal since 1977 (As part of Yugoslavia) + UN decl. sign.	Yes Life partnership from July 2021	No Constitutional ban since 2007	No	Yes	Yes Bans all anti-gay discrimination	Yes Requires sterilisation and surgery for change
North Macedonia	Yes Legal since 1996 + UN decl. sign.	No	No	No	Yes	Yes Bans all anti-gay discrimination	Yes Forbids discrimination based on gender identity. Gender change is legally recognized since 2021
Northern Cyprus (Disputed territory)	Yes Legal since 2014	No	No	No	No	Yes Bans all anti-gay discrimination	Yes Legal, requires surgery for change
Portugal	Yes Legal since 1983; equal age of consent since 2007 + UN decl. sign.	Yes De facto unions since 2001	Yes Legal since 2010	Yes Legal since 2016	Yes	Yes Bans all anti-gay discrimination	Yes All documents can be amended to the recognised gender since 2011
Romania	Yes Legal since 1996; equal age of consent since 2002 + UN decl. sign.	No	No	No LGBT individuals may adopt, but not same-sex couples	Yes	Yes Bans all anti-gay discrimination	Yes Legal recognition after sex reassignment surgery (sterilisation mandatory)
San Marino	Yes Legal since 1865 + UN decl. sign.	Yes Civil unions since 2019	No	Yes / No Stepchild adoption legal since 2019		Yes Bans all anti-gay discrimination	No legal recognition
Serbia	Yes Legal from 1858, when nominally a vassal of the Ottoman Empire to 1860, and again since 1994 (As part of Yugoslavia); equal age of consent since 2006 + UN decl. sign.	No	No Constitutional ban since 2006	No LGBT individuals may adopt, but not same-sex couples	Yes	Yes Bans all anti-gay discrimination	Yes Legal after 1 year of hormone therapy, surgery no longer required since 2019
Spain	Yes Legal since 1979 + UN decl. sign.	Yes De facto unions in Catalonia (1998), Aragon (1999), Navarre (2000), Castilla–La Mancha (2000), Valencia (2001), the Balearic Islands (2001), Madrid (2001), Asturias (2002), Castile and León (2002), Andalusia (2002), the Canary Islands (2003), Extremadura (2003), Basque Country (2003), Cantabria (2005), Galicia (2008) La Rioja (2010), and Murcia (2018), and in both autonomous cities; Ceuta (1998) and Melilla (2008).	Yes Legal since 2005	Yes Legal since 2005	Yes Includes transgender people	Yes Bans all anti-gay discrimination Pathologization or attempted treatment of sexual orientation by mental health professionals illegal nationwide since 2023.	Yes Since 2023, by way of self-determination
Turkey	Yes Legal since 1858	No	No	No	No	No	Yes Legal since 1988, requires sterilisation and surgery for change
Vatican City	Yes Legal since 1890 (As part of Italy)	No	No	No	Has no military	No	

=== Western Europe ===
LGBT rights in	Same-sex sexual activity	Recognition of same-sex unions	Same-sex marriage	Adoption by same-sex couples	LGBT people allowed to serve openly in military	Anti-discrimination laws concerning sexual orientation	Laws concerning gender identity/expression
Belgium	Yes Legal nationwide since 1795; equal age of consent since 1985 + UN decl. sign.	Yes Legal cohabitation since 2000	Yes Legal since 2003	Yes Legal since 2006	Yes Includes transgender people	Yes Bans all anti-gay discrimination	Yes Since 2018, sex changes do not require sterilisation and surgery
France	Yes Legal nationwide since 1791; Legal in Savoy since 1792; equal age of consent since 1982 + UN decl. sign.	Yes Civil solidarity pact since 1999	Yes Legal since 2013	Yes Legal since 2013	Yes Includes transgender people	Yes Bans all anti-gay discrimination	Yes Since 2017, sex changes no longer requires sterilisation and surgery
(Bailiwick of Guernsey) Guernsey (Crown Dependency of the United Kingdom)	Yes Legal since 1983; equal age of consent since 2012 + UN decl. sign.	Yes Civil partnerships performed in the UK abroad recognised for succession purposes in inheritance and other matters respecting interests in property since 2012 Legal cohabitation since 2017	Yes Legal since 2017 in Guernsey, since 2018 in Alderney, and since 2020 in Sark	Yes Legal since 2017	Yes UK responsible for defence	Yes Bans all anti-gay discrimination	Yes Legal gender changes since 2007
(Republic of Ireland) Ireland	Yes Male legal since 1993; Female always legal + UN decl. sign.	Yes Civil partnerships from 2011 to 2015 (existing partnerships are still recognised)	Yes Legal since 2015 after a constitutional referendum	Yes Legal since 2017	Yes Includes transgender people	Yes Bans all anti-gay discrimination	Yes Under the Gender Recognition Act 2015, by self-declaration.
Isle of Man; equal age of consent since 2006 (Crown Dependency of the United Kingdom)	Yes Legal since 1992 + UN decl. sign.	Yes Civil partnerships since 2011	Yes Legal since 2016	Yes Legal since 2011	Yes UK responsible for defence	Yes Bans all anti-gay discrimination	Yes Transgender people are allowed to change their legal gender and to have their new gender recognised as a result of the Gender Recognition Act 2009 (c.11)
Jersey; equal age of consent since 2006 (Crown Dependency of the United Kingdom)	Yes Legal since 1990 + UN decl. sign.	Yes Civil partnerships since 2012	Yes Legal since 2018	Yes Legal since 2012	Yes UK responsible for defence	Yes Bans all anti-gay discrimination	Yes Under the Gender Recognition (Jersey) Law 2010
Luxembourg	Yes Legal since 1795; equal age of consent since 1992 + UN decl. sign.	Yes Registered partnerships since 2004	Yes Legal since 2015	Yes Legal since 2015	Yes	Yes Bans all anti-gay discrimination	Yes No divorce, sterilization and/or surgery legally required since September 2018 for change of gender
Monaco	Yes Legal since 1793 + UN decl. sign.	Yes Cohabitation agreements since 2020	No (Proposed)	No	Yes France responsible for defence	Yes Bans some anti-gay discrimination	
Netherlands	Yes Legal since 1811; equal age of consent since 1971 + UN decl. sign.	Yes Registered partnership since 1998	Yes Legal since 2001	Yes Legal since 2001	Yes Includes transgender people	Yes Bans all anti-gay discrimination	Yes Since 2014, sex changes do not require sterilisation and surgery
United Kingdom	Yes Female always legal. Male legal in England and Wales since 1967, in Scotland since 1981, and in Northern Ireland since 1982; equal age of consent since 2001 + UN decl. sign.	Yes Civil partnerships since 2005	Yes Legal in England, Wales, and Scotland since 2014, and Northern Ireland since 2020	Yes Legal in England and Wales since 2005, in Scotland since 2009 and Northern Ireland since 2013	Yes Since 2000; Includes transgender people	Yes Bans all anti-gay discrimination	Yes / No Under the Gender Recognition Act 2004, except for the purpose of hereditary peerage inheritance

== Rating of countries from ILGA-Europe ==
The ILGA rating illustrates the legal and policy situation of LGBT people in countries. Data for May 2026. Source: ILGA-Europe

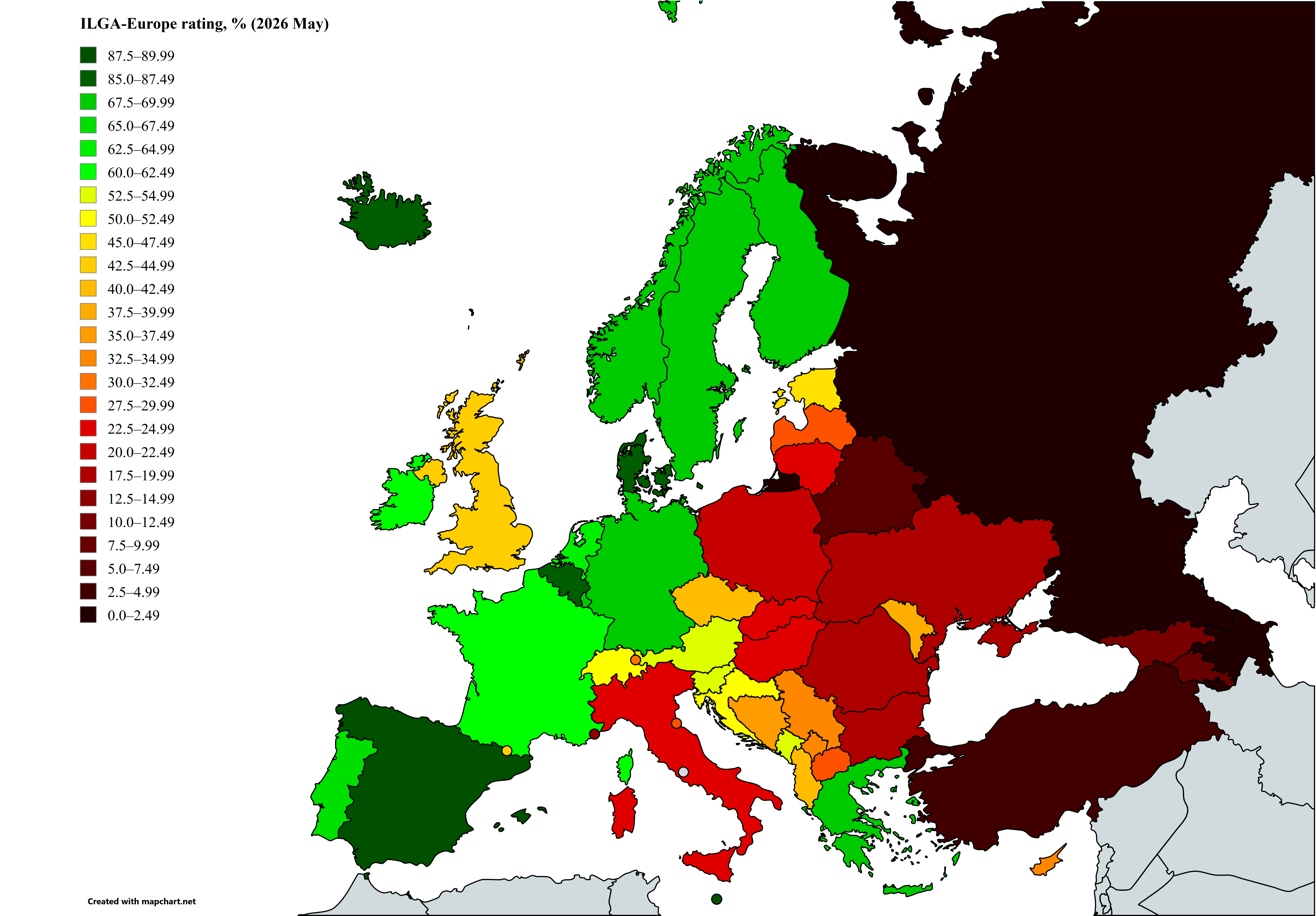
Map of European countries by the ILGA rating, as of May 2026

Country or territory	Rating, %
Spain	88.70
Malta	87.73
Iceland	85.56
Belgium	85.31
Denmark	85.10
Finland	69.85
Germany	69.54
Norway	68.60
Sweden	68.43
Luxembourg	68.41
Greece	68.27
Portugal	66.99
Netherlands	63.82
Ireland	61.34
France	60.25
Austria	54.98
Slovenia	54.29
Montenegro	52.84
Croatia	51.04
Switzerland	50.12
Estonia	46.37
United Kingdom	43.90
Andorra	43.00
Czechia	41.72
Albania	40.58
Moldova	38.41
Bosnia and Herzegovina	36.99
Kosovo	34.82
Serbia	33.76
Cyprus	33.69
Liechtenstein	31.30
Latvia	29.64
North Macedonia	29.26
San Marino	28.52
Slovakia	24.92
Italy	24.11
Lithuania	24.09
Hungary	22.70
Poland	21.50
Bulgaria	19.76
Ukraine	18.76
Romania	18.63
Monaco	13.70
Georgia	11.88
Armenia	9.16
Belarus	7.01
Turkey	4.75
Azerbaijan	2.25
Russia	2.00

== See also ==
- Recognition of same-sex unions in Europe
- LGBTQ rights in the European Union
- Same-sex adoption in Europe
- ILGA-Europe
- Age of consent in Europe
- LGBTQ rights by country or territory
- LGBTQ rights in Asia
- LGBTQ rights in Africa
- LGBTQ rights in Oceania
- LGBTQ rights in the Americas
- Transgender Europe
- Gayrope
