= LGBTQ rights in Transnistria =

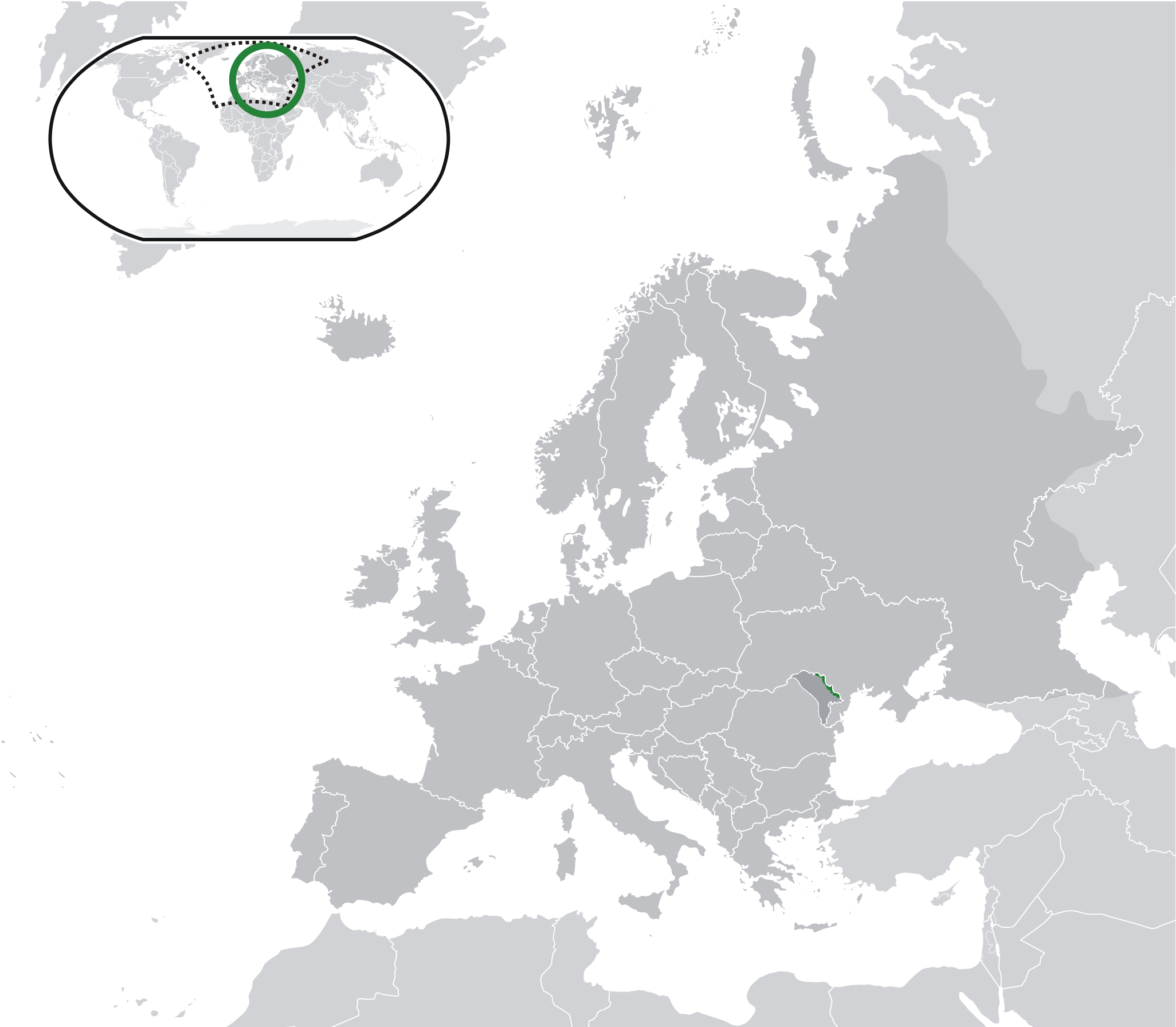
- Location of Transnistria (green) in Europe (dark grey) – [Legend]
- Legal status: Legal since 2002
- Penalty: No
- Gender identity: Legal since 2001 (required surgery)
- Military: -
- Discrimination protections: None

Family rights
- Recognition of relationships: None
- Adoption: -

Lesbian, gay, bisexual, and transgender (LGBT) people in Transnistria face legal challenges not experienced by non-LGBT residents. The Pridnestrovian Moldavian Republic (PMR) is an unrecognised breakaway state with its own judicial system. For the legal situation for LGBT individuals in Moldova, which Transnistria is recognised by most states as being part of, see LGBT rights in Moldova.

== Law regarding same-sex sexual activity ==
Consensual same-sex sexual activity is legal in Transnistria, despite many foreign sources saying that it is illegal. Article 131 of the Criminal Code of Transnistria that came into force in June 2002, states that committing sodomy, lesbianism and sexual intercourse with a person under the age of sixteen is illegal. However, the article does not state that committing 'sodomy and lesbianism' above 16 is illegal. All the other articles related to sex crimes, such as sexual assault and coercion to perform sexual acts, have listed '(heterosexual) sexual intercourse, sodomy and lesbianism' in the same category. There are no other articles in the Criminal Code of Transnistria that have laws that are separated in penalizing same-sex sexual activity, or committing 'sodomy and lesbianism.'

Despite this, LGBT individuals are subject to governmental and societal discrimination.

== Recognition of same-sex unions ==
Transnistria does not recognize same-sex unions. The Code of Marriage and Family that came into force in 2002 states that marriage is a voluntary marital union between a man and a woman. The code does not recognize other types of partnership for either opposite-sex or same-sex couples other than marriage.

== Summary table ==
Same-sex sexual activity legal	(Since 2002)
Equal age of consent (16)	Yes (Since 2002)
Anti-discrimination laws in employment only	No
Anti-discrimination laws in the provision of goods and services	No
Anti-discrimination laws in all other areas (incl. indirect discrimination, hate speech)	No
Same-sex marriage	No
Recognition of same-sex couples	No
Censorship of LGBT-issues	No (imprisonment since 2025)
Step-child adoption by same-sex couples	No
Joint adoption by same-sex couples	No
Gays and lesbians allowed to serve openly in the military	
Right to change legal gender	No
Access to IVF for lesbians	No
Commercial surrogacy for gay male couples	No
MSMs allowed to donate blood	No

== See also ==
- Human rights in Transnistria
- LGBT rights in Moldova
- LGBT rights in Russia
- LGBT rights in Europe
