= Killing of Nuno Ribeiro =

Homophobic murder in Andorra

- Location: 42°30′31.09″N 1°32′3.59″E; Escaldes–Engordany, Andorra
- Date: 14 April 2000; 26 years ago
- Attack type: Homicide
- Deaths: 1
- Victims: Nuno Miguel Ribeiro de Araujo, aged 17
- Perpetrators: Sergi Ruiz Lázaro; Domingo López Acedo
- Convictions: Murder

Nuno Miguel Ribeiro de Araujo, a 17-year-old openly homosexual Portuguese boy, was beat to death by two Spaniard youths aged 20 and 22, Sergi Ruiz Lázaro and Domingo López Acedo, in an alley in Escaldes-Engordany, Andorra, in the early morning of April 14, 2000. This crime had a media repercussion in the country because of the brutal violence they exercised and the homophobic motivation of the crime.

This murder motivated the creation of the association Som com Som to start the fight for LGBTQ rights in Andorra.

== Sentencing ==
The two assailants were sentenced to five and sixteen years respectively by the Tribunal de Corts. On October 24, 2001, the criminal division of the High Court of Andorra upheld the conviction. In May 2002, the Constitutional Court of Andorra partially overturned the conviction as it did not consider that it violated the dignity of the person because, at that time, homophobia was not criminalized. Therefore, the sentence of Sergi Ruiz and Domingo Lopez was reduced by one year, and they were convicted only for murder.

== See also ==
- Gay gang murders
- Yishai Schlissel
