= LGBTQ rights in Andorra =

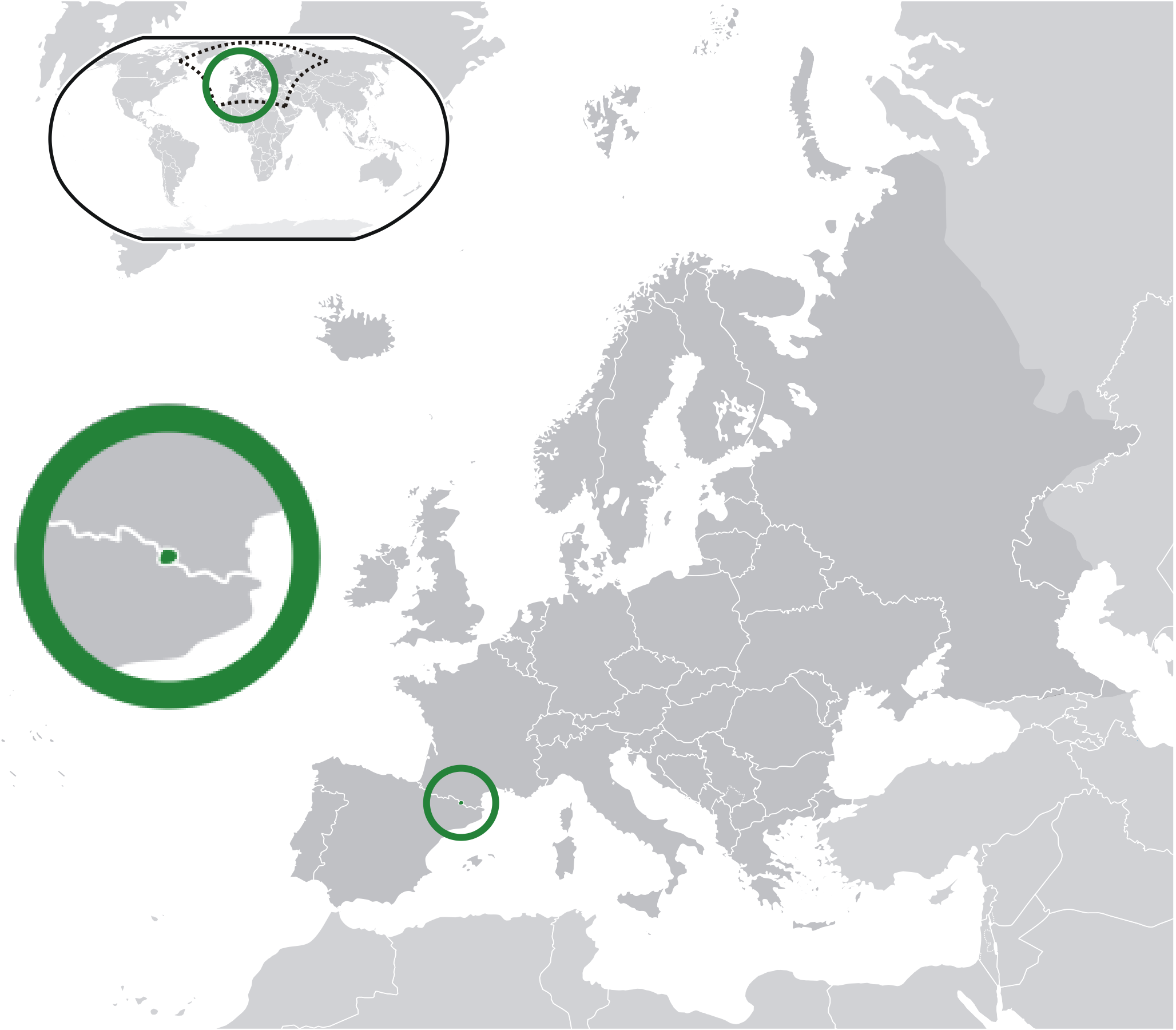
- Location of Andorra (green) in Europe (dark grey) – [Legend]
- Legal status: Legal since 1791
- Military: None
- Discrimination protections: Sexual orientation and gender identity protections

Family rights
- Recognition of relationships: Stable unions since 2005; Civil unions 2014–2023; Same-sex marriage since 2023
- Adoption: Full adoption rights since 2014

Lesbian, gay, bisexual, transgender, and queer (LGBTQ) rights in Andorra have advanced significantly in the 21st century, and are now considered generally progressive. Civil unions, which grants all the benefits of marriage (including adoption), have been recognized since 2014, and discrimination on the basis of sexual orientation is constitutionally banned. The General Council passed a bill on 21 July 2022 that would legalize same-sex marriage in 2023, and convert all civil unions into civil marriage. In September 2023, Xavier Espot Zamora, the prime minister of Andorra, officially came out as homosexual.

== Law regarding same-sex sexual activity ==
Same-sex sexual activity is legal in Andorra. A law prohibiting same-sex sexual activity was abolished in 1791.

=== Age of consent ===
The age of consent for both same-sex and heterosexual relationships is 16, as specified by Article 162 and 163 of the Penal Code.

== Recognition of same-sex relationships ==
Same-sex civil marriage within Andorra was legalised in 2023. Previously, civil unions were available.

Since 2005, same-sex couples have been able to register their partnership under the name "stable union of a couple" (unió estable de parella). On 2 June 2014, the ruling Democrats for Andorra party introduced a civil union bill to the General Council. The bill established civil unions equal to marriage in everything but name, and would also grant same-sex couples joint adoption rights. On 27 November 2014, the bill passed on a vote of 20 to 3 with several abstentions. On 24 December, the bill was published in the official journal, following promulgation by co-prince François Hollande as the signature of one of the two co-princes was needed. It took effect on 25 December.

On 10 March 2020, three parties forming the governing coalition, the Democrats, the Liberal Party and Committed Citizens, presented the draft of a bill to reform family law including to legalize same-sex marriage. The bill would also eliminate civil unions and convert all existing unions into civil marriage. The bill was introduced to the General Council on 24 November 2020 and was passed on 21 July 2022.

== Adoption and family planning ==
Before 2014, same-sex couples were not allowed to adopt, because the adoption law only recognised this possibility for heterosexual couples. This was changed when the civil union law granting full adoption rights was passed in November 2014 and came into force on 25 December 2014.

== Discrimination protections ==
Andorra has prohibited discrimination based on sexual orientation since 2005. Hate crimes motivated by the victim's sexual orientation result in additional legal penalties. In addition, in December 2008, the Constitutional Court ruled that sexual orientation is included in the prohibited grounds of discrimination in the Constitution of Andorra under the category "any other ground".

Article 4 of the Law 35/2008, of 18 November, on professional relations (Catalan: Llei 35/2008, del 18 de desembre, del Codi de relacions laborals) forbids employers and workers from discriminating against employees or colleagues on account of sexual orientation, among other categories.

Reports of public discrimination against LGBT people are rare. In 2000, a young gay man, 17-year-old Nuno Ribeiro, was murdered in the country due to his sexual orientation, resulting in public outcry. In addition, there are a few cases of parents expelling their children from their homes because of their sexual orientation. However, in general, Andorran society tends to be very tolerant of homosexuality and same-sex relationships, and acceptance is high.

In February 2019, the General Council adopted legislation addressing equal treatment and non-discrimination. The Llei 13/2019, del 15 de febrer, per a la igualtat de tracte i la no-discriminació ("Law 13/2019, of 15 February, for equal treatment and non-discrimination"), provides protection for LGBT people, among others, in numerous areas including employment, education, health care, social services, housing, public establishments, etc. Article 4(2) states:

No one may be discriminated against on the basis of birth, nationality or lack of nationality, racial origin or ethnicity, sex or female gender, religion, philosophical, political or trade union opinion, language, age, disability, sexual orientation, gender identity or expression, or any other personal or social condition or circumstance.

== Transgender rights ==
A new Family Law passed by Parliament on 21 July 2022 allows trans people to update their name and gender on legal documents through a simple process without medical intervention. The law came into effect six months after its promulgation.

Discrimination on account of gender identity and expression in areas such as employment, the provision of goods and services, etc., is prohibited. Additionally, the Llei 14/2019, del 15 de febrer, qualificada dels drets dels infants i els adolescents ("Law 14/2019, of 15 February, on the rights of children and adolescents") establishes that transgender children must be respected in their gender identity.

== Blood donation ==
Men who have sex with men (MSM) can donate blood to the Banc de Sang i Teixits de Catalunya, and to the Établissement Français du Sang in France.

== Activism ==
In 2019, LGBT group DiversAnd was formed. It was established after the association Som com Som (meaning "We Are As We Are" in Catalan) ended its work in 2018. DiversAnd focuses on preventing and addressing bullying and discrimination in schools, advocating for transgender people's rights to change their name and gender, and same-sex marriage. It organised a pride parade in June 2019.

The first LGBT demonstration in Andorra occurred on 6 September 2002. On 23 June 2003, Som Com Som organized the first gay pride parade in the country, which took place at the Plaça del Poble in Andorra la Vella.

On 17 May 2019, the International Day Against Homophobia, the Department of Equality launched a short film, entitled "#lovingdiversity", and raised online awareness of LGBT issues.

== Public opinion ==
According to a 2013 survey by the Institut d'Estudis Andorrans, 70% of Andorrans were in favour of same-sex marriage, 19% were against and 11% were undecided or had refused to answer.

== Summary table ==
Same-sex sexual activity legal	Yes (Since 1791)
Equal age of consent (14)	Yes (Since 1791)
Anti-discrimination laws for sexual orientation	Yes (Since 2005)
Anti-discrimination laws for gender identity or expression	Yes (Since 2019)
Hate crime laws include sexual orientation	Yes (Since 2005)
Hate crime laws include gender identity or expression	Yes (Since 2019)
Same-sex marriage	Yes (Since 2023)
Recognition of same-sex couples	Yes (Since 2005)
Stepchild adoption by same-sex couples	Yes (Since 2014)
Joint adoption by same-sex couples	Yes (Since 2014)
LGBT people allowed to serve openly in the military	Has no military
Right to change legal gender	Yes (Since 2023)
Intersex minors protected from invasive surgical procedures	No
Third gender option	No
Access to IVF for lesbian couples	Yes (Since 2023)
Conversion therapy banned on minors	No
Commercial surrogacy for gay male couples	No (Banned for heterosexual couples as well)
MSMs allowed to donate blood	Yes (Since 2011)

== See also ==
- Human rights in Andorra
- LGBT rights in Europe
- Killing of Nuno Ribeiro
