= LGBTQ rights in Vatican City =

- Location of Vatican City (green)
- Legal status: Legal since 1890, as part of Italy
- Gender identity: No
- Military: No army
- Discrimination protections: None

Family rights
- Recognition of relationships: No legal recognition
- Adoption: No

The legal code regarding lesbian, gay, bisexual, transgender, and queer (LGBTQ) rights in Vatican City is based on the Italian Zanardelli Code of 1889, since the founding of the sovereign state of Vatican City in 1929.

== Criminal law ==
Since 1890, the territory of what is now Vatican City has had no criminal laws against non-commercial, private, adult and consensual same-sex sexual activity. The age of consent is currently set at 18 years for all persons, regardless of gender; in the case of sexual relations within marriage – only in the cases of marriages recognized as valid by the Catholic Church and by the laws of Vatican City – the legal age is set at 14 years old.

Foreign diplomats, in order to be accredited, must not be part of a same-sex family, and must not be divorced. In 2008, Jean-Loup Kuhn-Delforge, who is an openly-gay diplomat, and who is in a civil pact with his partner, was rejected by Roman Catholic officials to be the French ambassador to the Holy See. In 2015, Laurent Stefanini, an openly-gay practising Catholic diplomat was rejected by Roman Catholic officials to be the French ambassador to the Holy See, despite being single. He was backed by President Francois Hollande and was supported by France's top Curia cardinal, Jean-Louis Tauran, who was the Camerlengo of the Holy Roman Church, and Cardinal André Vingt-Trois, Archbishop of Paris. France kept their ambassador position vacant from March 2015 to May 2016 in protest, before nominating another diplomat in May 2016.

== Recognition of same-sex relationships ==
Vatican City had always expressed disagreement with any civil recognition of same-sex unions, same-sex marriage, and the granting of adoption rights to same-sex couples.

Although Pope Francis expressed support for same-sex civil unions outside of the Catholic Church in 2023, he remained firm that "The Sacrament of Marriage is between a man and a woman as instituted by God."

== Discrimination protections ==
The Vatican reserves the right to remove, suspend and dismiss immediately any official and employee who publicly admits to being gay or questions the general policy of the Vatican towards homosexuals.

In 2021, the Vatican foreign minister, Archbishop Paul Richard Gallagher, delivered a letter to the Italian ambassador to the Holy See, expressing "concerns" over a bill in the Italian Parliament meant to legally protect LGBTQ Italians against violence and discrimination. The letter claimed the section of the bill prohibiting incitement of hatred on the basis of sexual orientation and gender identity constituted a violation of freedom of speech and of religion, and asked for the draft law's text to be reformulated.

== Protests ==
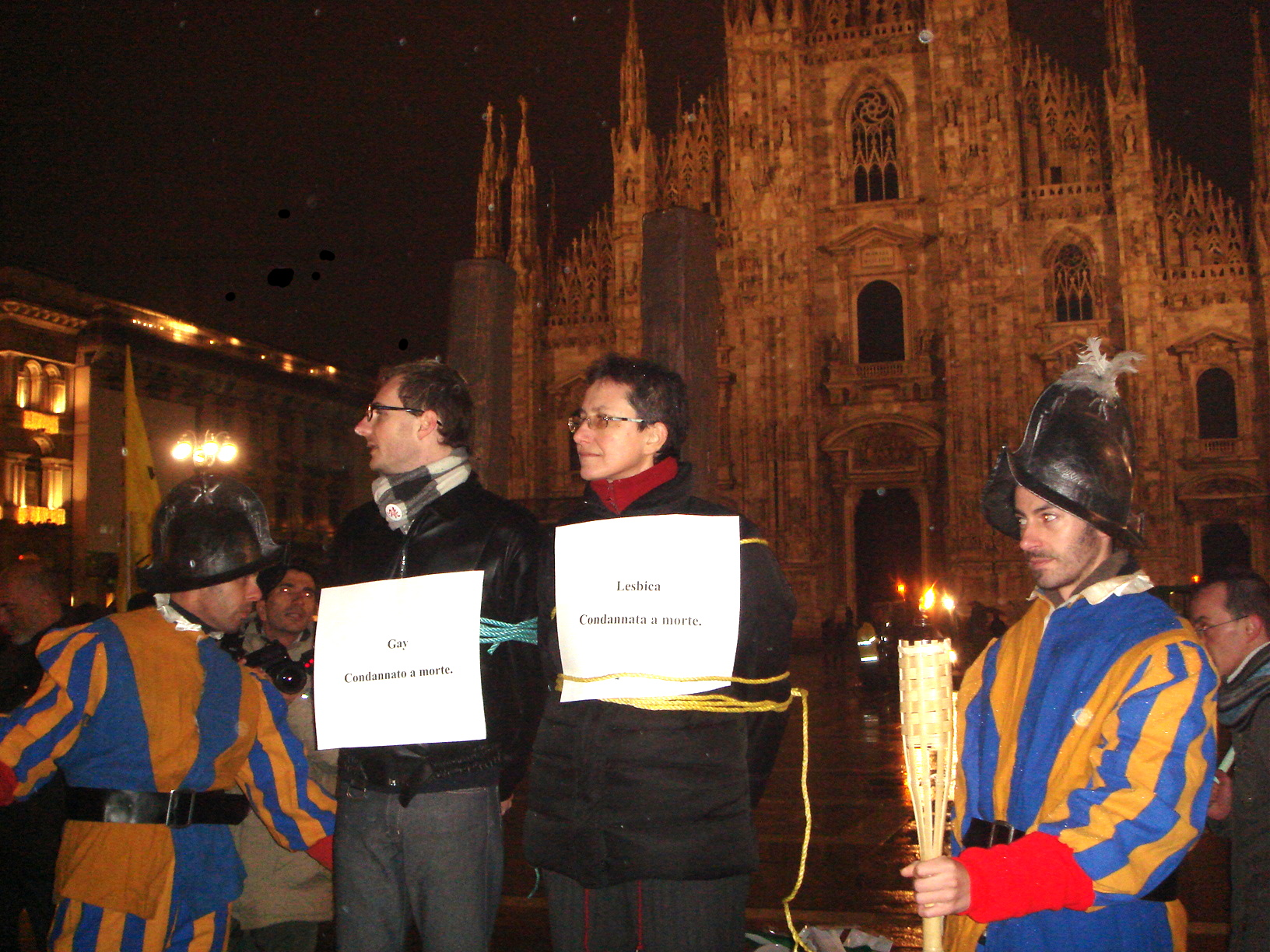
Activists protest in December 2008 in Milan the announcement by the Vatican's permanent observer to the United Nations that the Vatican will vote against a UN resolution calling for the decriminalization of homosexuality.

On 13 January 1998, the LGBTQ activist of Arcigay Alfredo Ormando set himself on fire on St. Peter's Square (which is under the jurisdiction of the Vatican City) in protest against the attitude of deep-rooted refusal that has always been expressed by the Catholic religion towards homosexuality. As a result of the severe burns suffered, he died a few days later in a hospital.

== Summary table ==
Same-sex sexual activity legal	Yes (Since 1890)
Equal age of consent (18)	Yes (Since 1890)
Anti-discrimination laws in employment only	No (The Holy See reserves the right to remove, suspend and dismiss immediately any employee declaring themselves homosexual or against the position of the Catholic Church on homosexuality or transsexuality)
Anti-discrimination laws in the provision of goods and services	No
Anti-discrimination laws in all other areas (incl. indirect discrimination, hate speech)	No
Same-sex marriage	No
Gays, lesbians and bisexuals allowed to serve openly in the Gendarmerie Corps and the Pontifical Swiss Guard	No
Access to IVF for lesbians	No
Commercial surrogacy for gay male couples	No
Allowed to donate blood	N/A (There is no official policy to ban blood donation for LGBTQ individuals; however, there are no hospitals in Vatican City to donate blood at).

== See also ==
- Amoris laetitia
- LGBTQ rights in Europe
- Catholic Church and homosexuality
- Index of Vatican City-related articles
- Instruction Concerning the Criteria for the Discernment of Vocations with regard to Persons with Homosexual Tendencies in view of their Admission to the Seminary and to Holy Orders
