= Bocani =

- Village
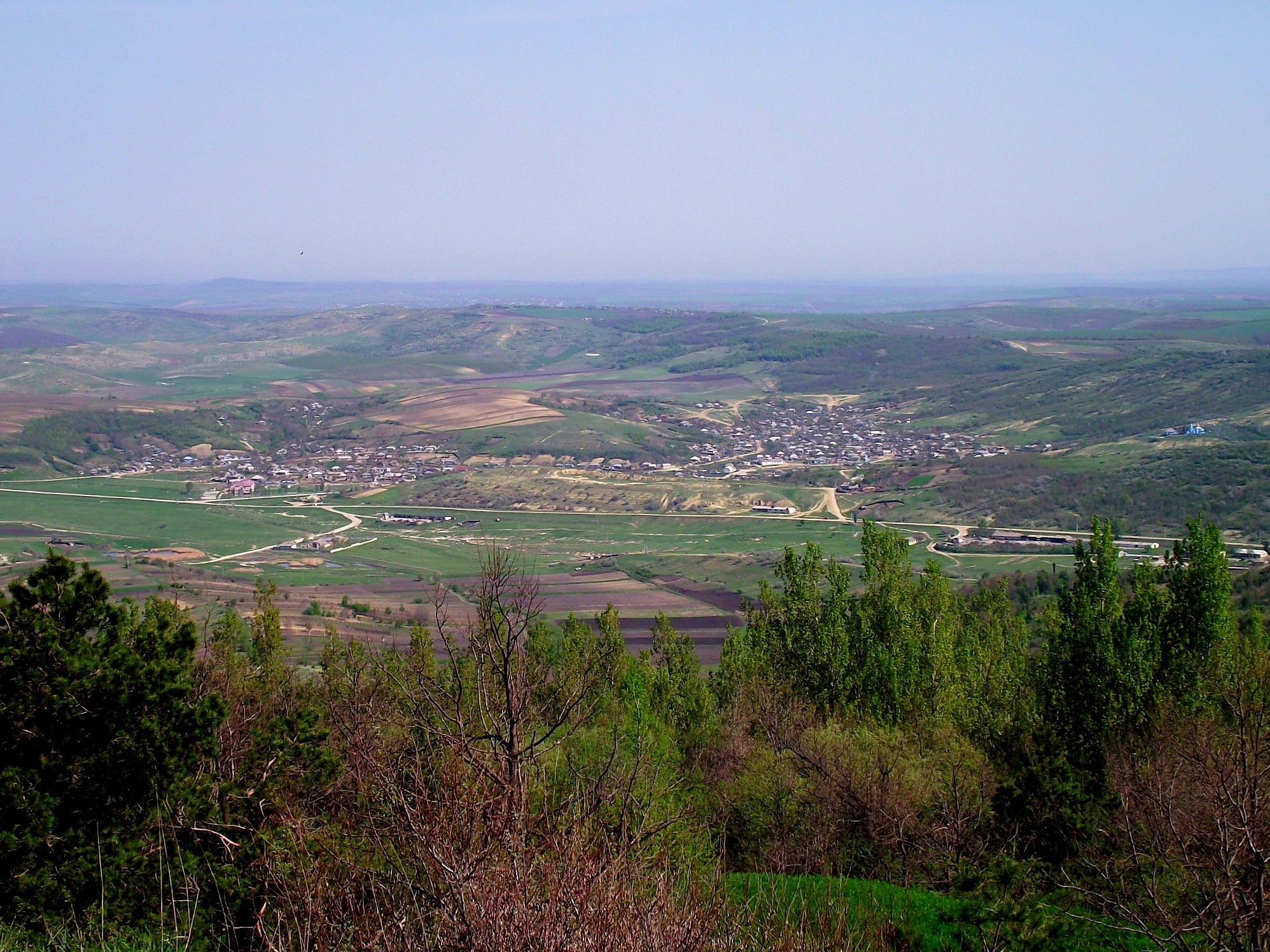
- Bocani, from Dealul Măgura

- Location within Moldova
- Coordinates: 47°31′07″N 27°53′25″E
- Country: Moldova
- District: Fălești District

Government
  - Mayor: Grigore Dreglea (PN)

Population (2014 census)
  - Total: 1,135
- Time zone: UTC+2 (EET)
  - Summer (DST): UTC+3 (EEST)

Bocani is a village in Fălești District, Moldova.
