= Recognition of same-sex unions in Moldova =

Moldova does not recognize same-sex marriage or civil unions. The Constitution of Moldova defines marriage as being between "a husband and a wife".

== Registered partnerships ==
Registered partnerships (Romanian: parteneriat înregistrat, pronounced [parteˈnerjat ɨnreˈdʒistrat]) (Note: Russian: гражданское партнёрство, graždánskoje partnjórstvo, pronounced [ɡrɐʐˈdanskə.jə pɐrtˈnʲɵrstvə]; Gagauz: vatandaş ortaklık, pronounced [wɑtɑnˈdɑʃ oɾtɑkˈlɯk]; Ukrainian: цивільне партнерство, cyvílʹne partnérstvo, pronounced [tsɪˈwilʲne pɐrtˈnɛrstwo]) are not recognized in Moldova. However, as a member of the Council of Europe, Moldova falls under the jurisdiction of the European Court of Human Rights (ECHR). In January 2023, the Grand Chamber of the European Court of Human Rights ruled in Fedotova and Others v. Russia that Article 8 of the European Convention on Human Rights, which guarantees a right to private and family life, imposes a positive obligation on all member states of the Council of Europe to establish a legal framework recognizing same-sex partnerships. If established, such a scheme would likely offer same-sex couples some of the rights, benefits and responsibilities of marriage.

The Fedotova ruling was vehemently opposed by the Moldovan Orthodox Church, the largest church in Moldova. Metropolitan Vladimir stated that Moldova was "in a worrying situation", saying that attempts to legalise civil partnerships "will be followed by a proportional reaction because such decisions go against the eminently Orthodox and historical conscience of the people. The Orthodox Church of Moldova urges the faithful to take a stand, obviously, strictly within limits allowed by the legislation in force of the Republic of Moldova, so that such legalisation and promotion of sin does not take place."

== Same-sex marriage ==
Laws regarding same-sex partnerships in Europe¹ Marriage Civil union Limited domestic recognition (cohabitation) Unrecognized Constitution limits marriage to opposite-sex couples ¹ May include recent laws or court decisions that have not yet entered into effect.

Article 48(2) of the Constitution of Moldova states that "[t]he family shall be founded on a freely consented marriage between a husband and wife, on their full equality in rights and the parents' right and obligation to ensure their children's upbringing, education and training." In addition, Article 48(1) states: "The family shall represent the natural and fundamental factor of the society, and shall enjoy the State and society protection." The wording has been interpreted as banning same-sex marriage, though the Constitutional Court of Moldova has not ruled on a case challenging this definition. The Family Code refers to married spouses as "man and woman". Article 2 of the code states that "family relations are performed according to the principles of [...] voluntariness of the marriage union of the man and woman [...]". Transgender persons are permitted to marry a person of the opposite sex after sex reassignment surgery and the changing of their identification documents to reflect their legal gender.

In December 2022, pro-Russia news outlets were erroneously reporting that the European Union had made the legalisation of same-sex marriage a condition for Moldova's accession to the union. A motion published in the Official Journal of the European Union on 16 December 2022 "invites the Republic of Moldova to eliminate the constitutional ban on same-sex marriages established in 1994 and to establish measures to combat discrimination for LGBTI people." The motion does not oblige and does not make the accession to the EU conditional on amending the Constitution.

In March 2023, four same-sex couples who were denied marriage licenses announced plans to challenge the refusal at the European Court of Human Rights. A couple, Angelica Frolov and Leo Zbancă, filed a lawsuit in April 2023 seeking legal recognition of their relationship. In June 2023, activists demonstrated in Chișinău for the legal recognition of same-sex unions. A spokesperson for the LGBT advocacy group GenderDoc-M said, "Currently, we have new initiatives [such as the marriage equality campaign], which for [us] is a sign of our development."

== Public opinion ==
Opinion polls report that a majority of Moldovans oppose the legal recognition of same-sex marriage. A 2014 survey from the Institute for Public Policy (IPP; Institutul pentru Politici Publice) showed that 6% of Moldovans supported same-sex marriage, while 87% were opposed. The same survey also showed that only 6% of Moldovans knew a gay person.

A 2017 Pew Research Center poll found that 5% of Moldovans supported same-sex marriage, the lowest in Eastern Europe alongside Russia. Support is increasing, with a 2022 poll commissioned by GenderDoc-M showing that 14% of Chișinău residents supported same-sex marriage. The poll also showed that residents who had a negative attitude towards LGBT people decreased from 55% to 33% in the space of three years. LGBT advocate Angelica Frolov said, in response to the survey, "Already in 2022 we have some changes at the level of legislation. Finally, the law providing for punishments for hate crimes and hate speech was passed. It is a step forward because the LGBT community will also be protected and is expressly mentioned in the law among the protected criteria. There are a lot of positive developments in the country. Obviously they are because the homophobic party, the Party of Socialists, has left, which was doing everything it could to prevent equal rights for some groups. There came a pro-European party that believes that the people should not be divided, that all people, equally, must enjoy their rights", referencing the 2020 election in which Maia Sandu of the Party of Action and Solidarity defeated Igor Dodon of the Party of Socialists, known for its social conservatism.

== See also ==
- LGBT rights in Moldova
- Recognition of same-sex unions in Europe
