= List of LGBTQ-related cases before international courts and quasi-judicial bodies =

This list contains cases of the European Commission of Human Rights, European Court of Human Rights (ECtHR), Inter-American Court of Human Rights, Inter-American Commission on Human Rights, Court of Justice of the European Union (CJEU), European Committee of Social Rights (ECSR) and United Nations Human Rights Committee (UN HRC) related to LGBTQ people. According to one study of the European human rights system, recognition of an LGBT right by the ECtHR increased the likelihood that other countries in the Council of Europe would adopt the LGBT right as policy.

== Council of Europe ==
=== European Commission of Human Rights ===
This table is for cases heard only by the European Commission of Human Rights, a human rights body of the Council of Europe disbanded in 1998. Cases heard by the commission and subsequently the European Court of Human Rights are listed in the next table. Both the commission and the court interpret the European Convention on Human Rights.

Date of ruling	Case	Notes	Outcome
1955	W. B. v. Germany (no. 104/55)	Criminalization of sex between men	Inadmissible
1975, September	X. v. Germany (5935/72)	Criminalization of sex between men	Inadmissible
1977, December	X. v. Germany (no. 6699/74)	Gender reassignment and its consequences	Friendly settlement
1982, May	X. Ltd. and Y. v. United Kingdom (no. 8710/79)	Freedom of assembly, expression and association	Inadmissible
1983, May	X. and Y. v. United Kingdom (9369/81)	Deportation of one member of a same-sex couple	Inadmissible
1983, October	B. v. United Kingdom (9237/81)	Criminalization of homosexual acts between soldiers	Inadmissible
1986, May	S. v. United Kingdom (11716/85)	Right to remain in a tenancy after partner's death	Inadmissible
1986, July	Johnson v. United Kingdom	Criminalization of homosexual sex parties	Inadmissible
1987, July	W. J. and D. P. v. United Kingdom	Deportation of one member of a same-sex couple	Inadmissible
1988, March	F v. Switzerland (no. 11680/85)	Criminalization or detention	Inadmissible
1988, May	Morissens v. Belgium (no. 11389/85)	Freedom of assembly, expression and association	Inadmissible
1988, December	James v. United Kingdom (no. 10622/83)	Gender reassignment and its consequences	No violation
1989, March	W. v. United Kingdom (no. 11095/84)	Gender reassignment and its consequences	No violation
1989, October	C. and L. M. v. United Kingdom (no. 14753/89)	Residence permits, asylum and extradition	Inadmissible
1989, November	Eriksson and Goldschmidt v. Sweden (no. 14573/89)	Refusal of marriage of transgender woman to another woman	Inadmissible
1990	Z.B. v. United Kingdom (16106/90)	Residence permits, asylum and extradition	Inadmissible
1992	Kerkhoven and Hinke v. Netherlands (15666/89)	Refusal of second parent adoption to a lesbian couple	Inadmissible
1992	Zukrigl v. Austria (17279/90)	Age of consent	Inadmissible
1995	Wilde, Greenhalgh and Parry v. United Kingdom (22382/93)	Age of consent	Struck out due to change in UK law
1995	H.F. v. Austria (22646/93)	Age of consent	Inadmissible
1996	Röösli v. Germany (28318/95)	Housing tenure, social and employer's benefits	Inadmissible
1997	Marangos v. Cyprus (31106/96)	Criminalization of sex between men	Violation of article 8 based on the court's finding in Modinos v. Cyprus
1997	L.F. v. Ireland (28154/95)	Gender reassignment and its consequences	Inadmissible
1997	X.,Y. and Z. v. United Kingdom	Gender reassignment and its consequences	None
1997	Roetzheim v. Germany	Gender reassignment and its consequences	Inadmissible
1998	Sobhani v. Sweden (No. 32999/96)	Residence permits, asylum and extradition	Struck out
1998	Kara v. United Kingdom	Dress code	Inadmissible

=== European Court of Human Rights ===
A 2021 examination of the ECtHR's rulings on people seeking asylum on the grounds of their sexual orientation between 1990 and 2019 found that of 23 cases, 20 were declared inadmissible, 2 were denied, and one violation was found. This does not count cases that were struck out.

==== Concluded cases ====
Date of ruling	Case	Notes	Articles violated
1978, October	X. v. United Kingdom (7215/75)	Age of consent	None
1980, November	Van Oosterwijck v. Belgium (7654/76)	Gender reassignment and its consequences	8 (family and private life)
1981, October	Dudgeon v. United Kingdom (no. 7525/76)	Criminalization	8
1986, October	Rees v. United Kingdom (9532/81)	Gender reassignment and its consequences	None
1988, May	Müller and Others v. Switzerland (no. 10737/84)	Freedom of assembly, expression and association	None
1988, October	Norris v. Ireland (no. 10581/83)	Criminalization	8
1990	Cossey v. United Kingdom	Refusal of marriage between transgender woman and a man	8 and 12 (right to marry)
1992	B. v. France	Gender reassignment and its consequences	8
1992	Scherer v. Switzerland	Criminal conviction for private screenings of homosexual pornography	Struck out
1993	Modinos v. Cyprus (no. 15070/89)	Criminalization of sex between men	8
1996, November	Wingrove v. United Kingdom (17419/90)	Freedom of assembly, expression and association	None
1997, January	Laskey, Jaggard and Brown v. United Kingdom (nos. 21627/93, 21826/93 and 21974/93)	Criminalization of sadomasochistic homosexual sex occasioning actual bodily harm	None
1998	Sheffield and Horsham v. the United Kingdom	Gender reassignment and its consequences	None
1999, September	Smith and Grady v. United Kingdom (nos. 33985/96, 33986/96), joined with Lustig-Prean and Beckett v United Kingdom (nos. 31417/96, 32377/96)	Dismissal of homosexual personnel from military service	8
1999, December	Salgueiro da Silva Mouta v. Portugal (no. 33290/96)	Adoption, parental rights and obligations	14 in conjunction with 8
2000, March	Craig v. United Kingdom (no. 45396/99)	Adoption, parental rights and obligations	Inadmissible
2000, July	A.D.T. v. United Kingdom	Criminalization of group sex between men	8
2001, March	Sutherland v. United Kingdom	Age of consent	Struck out due to change in the law
2001, May	Mata Estevez v. Spain (no. 56501/00)	Housing tenure, social and employer's benefits	Inadmissible
2001	Morris v. United Kingdom	Age of consent	Struck out due to change in the law
2002, February	Fretté v. France (no 36515/97)	Adoption, parental rights and obligations	6
2002, July	Christine Goodwin v. United Kingdom (no 28957/95)	Gender reassignment and its consequences	8 and 12
2002	I. v. United Kingdom	Gender reassignment and its consequences	8 and 12
2002	Tosto v. Italy	Blood donation	Struck out
2002, October	Beck, Copp and Bazeley v. the United Kingdom (nos. 48535/99, 48536/99, 48537/99)	Military service	8 and 13
2002, October	Perkins and R. v. the United Kingdom (nos. 43208/98, 44875/98)	Military service	8
2003, January	S. L. v. Austria (no. 45330/99)	Age of consent	14 in conjunction with 8
2003, January	L. and V. v. Austria (nos. 39392/98, 39829/98)	Age of consent	14 in conjunction with 8
2003 July	Karner v. Austria (no. 40016/98)	Housing tenure, social and employer's benefits	14 in conjunction with 8
2003	Van Kück v. Germany	Gender reassignment and its consequences	6 and 8
2003	Brown v. United Kingdom	Military service	Struck out
2004, February	B.B. v. United Kingdom (no. 53760/00)	Age of consent	14 in conjunction with 8
2004	F. v. United Kingdom (17341/03)	Residence permits, asylum and extradition	Inadmissible
2004	Woditschka and Wilfling v. Austria	Age of consent	14 in conjunction with 8
2004	I. I. N. v. The Netherlands (2035/04)	Residence permits, asylum and extradition	Inadmissible
2005	Ladner v. Austria	Age of consent	14 in conjunction with 8
2005	Wolfmeyer v. Austria	Age of consent	14 in conjunction with 8
2005	H. G. and G. B. v. Austria	Age of consent	
2006	Grant v. United Kingdom	Gender reassignment and its consequences	
2006	R.H. v. Austria	Age of consent	
2006	Parry v. United Kingdom	Gender reassignment and its consequences	
2006	R. and F. v. United Kingdom	Gender reassignment and its consequences	
2007	Bączkowski and Others v. Poland (no. 1543/06)	Ban of a gay pride parade in Warsaw	11 (freedom of assembly and association), 13 and 14
2007	L. v. Lithuania	Gender reassignment and its consequences	8
2008, January	E.B. v. France (no. 43546/02)	Adoption, parental rights and obligations	
2008	Courten v. United Kingdom	Housing tenure, social and employer's benefits	
2008, December	Stavros Marangos v. Cyprus (no. 12846/05)	Military service	
2009	Schlumpf v. Switzerland	Gender reassignment and its consequences	
2009, June	Small v. the United Kingdom (no. 7330/06)	Age of consent	
2009, June	Hunt and Miller v. the United Kingdom (nos. 10578/05 and 10605/05)	Military service	
2009	M.W. v. United Kingdom	Housing tenure, social and employer's benefits	
2010, March	Kozak v. Poland (no. 13102/02)	Housing tenure, social and employer's benefits	
24 June 2010	Schalk and Kopf v. Austria (no. 30141/04)	Registration of partnership	None
2010, July	P.B. and J.S. v. Austria (no. 18984/02)	Housing tenure, social and employer's benefits	
2010, September	J. M. v. The United Kingdom (no. 37060/06)	Adoption, parental rights and obligations	
2010, September	dos Santos Couto v. Portugal (no. 31874/07)	Age of consent	
2010, October	Alekseyev v. Russia (no. 4916/07, 25924/08, 14599/09)	Freedom of assembly, expression and association	
2010, November	P. V. v. Spain (no. 35159/09)	Gender reassignment and its consequences	
2011, February	R.A. v. France (no. 49718/09)	Residence permits, asylum and extradition	
2011, May	D.B.N. v. United Kingdom (26550/10)		
2011, October	Stasi v. France (no. 25001/07)	Violence and lack of investigation thereof	None
2011, September	P. v. Portugal (no. 56027/09)	Gender reassignment and its consequences	
2012, February	Vejdeland and others v. Sweden	Conviction for distributing anti-gay leaflets at a school	None
2012, March	Gas and Dubois v. France (no. 25951/07)	Adoption, parental rights and obligations	
2012, July	A. S. B. v. the Netherlands	Residence permits, asylum and extradition	
2012, June	Genderdoc-M. v. Moldova (no. 9106/06)	Freedom of assembly, expression and association	
2012, June	K.N. v. France 47129/09		
2012, July	A. K. v. Poland (no. 7705/05)	Gender reassignment and its consequences	
2012,	Zontul v. Greece		
2012, October	Molnar v. Romania (no. 16637/06).	Freedom of assembly, expression and association	
2012, October	X. v. Turkey (no. 24626/09)	Extended solitary confinement of a homosexual detainee	14 in conjunction with 3
2012, November and 2014, July	H. v. Finland; Hämäläinen v. Finland (no. 37359/09)	Gender reassignment and its consequences	
2013, January	Eweida and Others v. United Kingdom (nos. 48420/10, 59842/10, 51671/10 and 36516/10) (see Ladele v London Borough of Islington and McFarlane v Relate Avon Ltd)	Personal refusal of services	
2013, February	X and Others v. Austria	Adoption, parental rights and obligations	14 in conjunction with 8
2013, June	M.K.N. v. Sweden	Residence permits, asylum and extradition	
2013, July	Cassar v. Malta (no. 36982/11)	Gender reassignment and its consequences	
2013, November	E.B. and Others v. Austria (no. 48098/07)	Age of consent	14 in conjunction with 8, 13
2013, October	Georgescu v. Romania (no. 4867/03)		Inadmissible
7 November 2013	Vallianatos and Others v. Greece (nos. 29381/09, 32684/09)	Registration of partnership	14 in conjunction with 8
2014, March	F. J. and E.B. against Austria		
2014, April	Mladina d.d. Ljubljana v Slovenia		
2014, April and 2015, April	M. E. v. Sweden	Residence permits, asylum and extradition	
2015, January	Kostadinov v. Bulgaria (no. 37124/10)		6
2015, March	Y.Y. v. Turkey (no. 14793/08)	Gender reassignment and its consequences	
2015, May	Identoba and Others v. Georgia	Freedom of assembly, expression and association	
2015, July	Oliari and Others v. Italy	Registration of partnership	8
2015, September	A.E. v. Finland (no. 30953/11)	Residence permits, asylum and extradition	
2016, February	Pajić v. Croatia	Residence permits, asylum and extradition	
2016, March	Novruk and Other v. Russia	Residence permits, asylum and extradition	
2016, April	M.C. and A.C. v Romania (no. 12060/12)	Failure to adequately investigate homophobic attack on participants in pride parade	3 in conjunction with 14
2016, 19 April	A. N. v. France	Residence permits, asylum and extradition	
2016, June	Chapin and Charpentier v. France	Registration of partnership	
2016, June	Aldeguer Tomás v. Spain	Housing tenure, social and employer's benefits	
2016, June	Taddeucci and McCall v. Italy	Residence permits, asylum and extradition	
2016, 5 July	O.M. v. Hungary (no. 9912/15)	Residence permits, asylum and extradition	
2016, November	Kaos GL v. Turkey	Confiscation of a gay and lesbian magazine	10
2016, 13 December	M.B. v. Spain (no. 15109/15)	Residence permits, asylum and extradition	
2017, 3 January	H.A. and H.A. v. Norway (no. 56167/16)	Residence permits, asylum and extradition	
2017, February	Yefremenkova and Others v. Russia (no. 19700/11) & Nepomnyashchiy v. Russia (no. 51169/10)	Freedom of assembly, expression and association	
2017, 25 April	A.T. v. Sweden (no. 78791/14)	Residence permits, asylum and extradition	
2017, April	A. P., Garçon and Nicot v. France (nos. 79885/12, 52471/13 and 52596/13)	Gender reassignment and its consequences	
2017, June	Bayev and Others v. Russia (nos. 67667/09, 44092/12 and 56717/12)	Freedom of assembly, expression and association	
2017, 26 September	E.S. v. Spain (no. 13273/16)	Residence permits, asylum and extradition	
2017, December	Francesca Orlandi and Others v. Italy (no. 26431/12)	Registration of partnership	
2017, 28 November	M.B. v. Netherlands (no. 63890/16)	Residence permits, asylum and extradition	
2017, 19 December	I.K. v. Switzerland (no. 21417/17)	Residence permits, asylum and extradition	
2018, January	Hallier and Lucas v. France (no. 46386/10)	Adoption, parental rights and obligations	
2018, February	Bonnaud and Lecoq v. France (no. 6190/11)	Adoption, parental rights and obligations	
2018, 27 March	M.T. v. France (no. 61145/16)	Residence permits, asylum and extradition	Struck out
2018, 2 October	Khudoberdi Turgunaliyevich Nurmatov v. Russia (no. 56368/17)	Residence permits, asylum and extradition	
2018, November	Alekseyev and Others v. Russia (nos. 14988/09 and others)	Freedom of assembly, expression and association	
2019, 17 January	A.R.B. v. Netherlands (no. 8108/18)	Residence permits, asylum and extradition	
2019, July	Zhdanov and Others v. Russia (nos. 12200/08, 35949/11, 58282/12)	Freedom of assembly, expression and association	
2019, 12 November	S.A.C. v. United Kingdom (no. 31428/18)	Residence permits, asylum and extradition	
2020, January	Beizaras and Levickas v. Lithuania No. 41288/15	Failure to investigate threatening comments posted on Facebook	14 in conjunction with 8, 13
2020, June	Lilliendahl v. Iceland (29297/18)	The applicant was fined for homophobic hate speech	None
2020, 6 July	Rana v. Hungary (no. 40888/17)	Residence permits, asylum and extradition; Gender reassignment and its consequences	
2020, 9 July	Y.T. v. Bulgaria (41701/16)	Refusal of legal gender reassignment	8
2020, October	Aghdgomelashvili and Japaridze v. Georgia (no. 7224/11)	Police raid on an LGBT organization	11, 14 in conjunction with 3
2020, 13 October	Sozayev and Others v. Russia (nos. 67685/14 & 35199/15)	Freedom of assembly, expression and association	
2020, 17 November	B and C v. Switzerland (nos. 889/19 and 43987/16)	Residence permits, asylum and extradition	3
2020, December	Berkman v. Russia (no. 46712/15)	Freedom of assembly, expression and association	
2021, January	Sabalić v. Croatia (no. 50231/13)	Inadequate response to a violent homophobic attack by a private party on the applicant	Procedural aspect of 3 in conjunction with 14
2021, January	X v. Romania and Y v. Romania (nos. 2145/16 and 20607/16)	Gender reassignment and its consequences	
2021, 23 March	R.Y. v. Russia (no. 21977/20	Residence permits, asylum and extradition	Struck out
2021, July	A.M. and Others v. Russia (no. 47220/19	Gender reassignment and its consequences; parental rights and obligations	
2021, July	Fedotova and Others v. Russia (no. 2064/10	Registration of partnership	8
2021, September	X. v. Poland (20741/10)	Refused custody of her child due to her sexual orientation	14 in conjunction with 8
2022, May	M. v. France (42821/18)	Intersex normalization surgery performed on a child	Inadmissible
2023, March	Macatė v. Lithuania (61435/19)	Restrictions on an LGBT-themed children's book had no legitimate purpose	10 § 2
2023, May	Buhuceanu and Others v. Romania	Recognition of same-sex relationships	8
2023, June	Maymulakhin and Markiv v. Ukraine	Recognition of same-sex relationship	8 and 14
2023, June	Lenis v. Greece	Extreme homophobic speech not protected by freedom of expression	Inadmissible
2023, September	Lapunov v. Russia (28834/19)	The court ruled that Lapunov was wrongfully detained and tortured by agents of the Russian state during the anti-gay purges in Chechnya based solely on his sexual orientation	3, 5, and 14
2023, September	Koilova and Babulkova v. Bulgaria	Registration of partnership	8
2023, December	Przybyszewska and Others v. Poland (11454/17, 11810/17, 15273/17, 16898/17, 24231/17, 24351/17, 25891/17, 25904/17, 30128/18, 30340/18)	Registration of partnership	8
2024, 19 September	Formela v Poland (58828/12, 40795/17, 55306/18, 55321/18)	Registration of partnership	8
2025, 27 February	Szypuła v Poland, Urbanik and Alonso Rodriguez v Poland (78030/14 and 23669/16)	Refusal to issue marriage eligibility documents	8
2025, 24 April	Andersen v. Poland (53662/20)	Registration of marriage performed abroad	8

ILGA-Europe maintains a list of recently concluded ECtHR cases and their execution status.

==== Pending cases ====
Case	Topic
Đorđević and others v. Serbia (5591/10) and three other applications	Ban of pride parade
Y.P. v. Russia (8650/12)	Legal gender recognition
Oganezova v. Armenia (71367/12 and 72961/12)	Failure to investigate arson attack on LGBT club
Iachimovschi v. Moldova and 5 other applications (Nos. 21029/13, 40620/14, 23914/15, 26806/15, 32617/16 and 49542/16)	Anti-LGBT violence by private individuals
Dietz and Suttasom v. Austria (no. 31185/13)	Registration of partnership
R.L. v. Russia and P.O. v. Russia (36253/13 and 52516/13)	Legal gender recognition
Grochulski v Poland (131/15)	Non-registered partnership rights
A.D.-K. and Others v. Poland (30806/15)	Refusal to issue birth certificate
Schlittner-Hay v. Poland (56846/15 and 56849/15)	Refusal of Polish citizenship to two children born through surrogacy, whose biological father is a Polish citizen
Minasyan and others v. Armenia (59180/15)	Newspaper publications with discriminatory language and incitement to discrimination, which has no redress under Armenian law
Koutra and Katzaki v. Greece (459/16)	Detention and mistreatment of transgender sex workers and their lawyer
X. v. Russia (60796/16)	Refusal of name change to a transgender individual
Solmaz v. Turkey (49373/17)	Alleged discrimination based on gender identity
A.D. v. Georgia and A.K. v. Georgia (57864/17 and 79087/17)	Recognition of gender transition
Y v. France (76888/17)	Non-binary gender recognition for an intersex person
A. v. Azerbaijan (17184/18), 18 other applications	Arbitrary arrest, ill-treatment, and forced medical examinations of LGBT people in Baku
Starska v. Poland (18822/18)	Right to change surname
O.H. and G.H. v. Germany (53568/18 and 54741/18)	Transgender parenthood
Meszkes v Poland (11560/19)	Registration of partnership, inheritance rights
Lee v. UK (18860/19)	Personal refusal of services
Buhuceanu and Ciobotaru v. Romania (No. 20081/19)	Registration of partnership
Handzlik-Rosuł and Rosuł v Poland (45301/19)	Same-sex marriage contracted abroad
V.D. v. Russia (57893/19)	Extradition and non-refoulement
S.K.K. and A.C.G. v. Romania (5926/20)	Registration of partnership
A. H. and others v. Germany (7246/20)	Transgender parenthood

=== European Committee of Social Rights ===
The European Committee of Social Rights issues judgements based on the European Social Charter, a Council of Europe treaty.

Date of ruling	Case	Topic
2009	INTERIGHTS v. Croatia (45/2007)	

== European Union ==
All European Union member states are also members of the Council of Europe and subject to the ECtHR.

=== Court of Justice of the European Union ===
Date of ruling	Case	Topic
1996	C-13/94 P. v. S and Cornwall County Council	Gender reassignment and its consequences
1998	C-249/96 Grant v. South West Trains Ltd.	Housing tenure, social and employer's benefits
2001	C-125/99 D. v. Council	Housing tenure, social and employer's benefits
2004	C-117/01 K.B. v. NHS Pensions Agency	Gender reassignment and its consequences
2006	C-423/04 Richards v. Secretary of State for Work and Pensions	Gender reassignment and its consequences
2008	C-267/06 Maruko v. VddB	Housing tenure, social and employer's benefits
2010	W. v. Commission	
2011	C-147/08 Römer v. City of Hamburg	Housing tenure, social and employer's benefits
2012	C-124/11 (Dittrich), C-125/11 (Klinke) and C143/11 (Müller)	Housing tenure, social and employer's benefits
2013, April	Asociatia Accept v Consiliul Naţional pentru Combaterea Discriminării (C-81/12)	Employment
2013, November	Minister voor Immigratie en Asiel v X (C-199/12), Y (C-200/12), and Z v Minister voor Immigratie en Asiel (C-201/12)	Residence permits, asylum and extradition
2013, December	Hay v Crédit agricole mutuel (C-267/12).	Housing tenure, social and employer's benefits
2014, December	A, B, C v Staatssecretaris van Veiligheid en Justitie (C-148/13, C-149/13, C-150/13)	Residence permits, asylum and extradition
2015, April	Léger v Ministre des Affaires sociales... (C-528/13)	Blood donation
2018, January	F. v Bevándorlási és Állampolgársági Hivatal (C-473/16)	Residence permits, asylum and extradition
2018, June	Coman and Others v Inspectoratul General pentru Imigrӑri and Others (C-673/16)	Residence permits, asylum and extradition
2020, April	NH v Associazione Avvocatura per i diritti LGBTI – Rete Lenford (C-507/18)	Employment
2021, December	V.M.A. v Stolichna Obsthina, Rayon 'Pancharevo' (C-490/20)	Citizenship
2025, November	Cupriak-Trojan and Trojan v Wojewoda Mazowiecki (C-713/23)	Residence permits, asylum and extradition

== Organization of American States ==
=== Inter-American Commission on Human Rights ===
Date of ruling	Case	Topic
1999, May	Álvarez Giraldo v. Colombia	
2010, September	Atala Riffo and Daughters v. Chile	Denial of child custody to a lesbian mother
2013, November	Flor Freire v. Ecuador	Discharge from duty of a military person accused of engaging in homosexual conduct
2014, April	Duque v. Colombia	Housing tenure, social and employer's benefits
2020, December	Gareth Henry and Simone Carline Edwards v. Jamaica	Criminalization of homosexual sex

=== Inter-American Court of Human Rights ===
Date of ruling	Case	Topic
2012, February	Atala Riffo and Daughters v. Chile	Denial of child custody to a lesbian mother
2016, February	Duque v. Colombia	Housing tenure, social and employer's benefits
2016, August	Flor Freire v. Ecuador	Discharge from duty of a military person accused of engaging in homosexual conduct
2017, November	Advisory Opinion OC-24/17 November 24, 2017	Legalisation of same-sex marriage

== United Nations ==
=== United Nations Human Rights Committee ===
The United Nations Human Rights Committee oversees the International Covenant on Civil and Political Rights.

Date of ruling	Case	Topic
1985	Hertzberg et al. v. Finland (61/1979)	Freedom of assembly, expression and association
1994	Toonen v. Australia (488/1992)	Criminalization or detention
2002	Joslin v. New Zealand (902/1999)	Registration of partnership
2003	Young v. Australia (941/2000)	Housing tenure, social and employer's benefits
2005	X. v. Colombia	
2012	Fedotova v. Russia	Freedom of assembly, expression and association
2014	Praded v. Belarus (2029/2011)	Freedom of assembly, expression and association
2016	Androsenko v. Belarus (2092/2011)	Freedom of assembly, expression and association
2017	G. v. Australia (2172/2012)	Gender reassignment and its consequences
2017	C. v. Australia (2216/2012)	Prohibition of access to divorce proceedings for same-sex couples married abroad
2018	Kirill Nepomnyashchiy v. Russia (2318/2013)	Freedom of assembly, expression and association
Ongoing	Alekseyev v. Russia, No. 1873/2009	

== See also ==
- LGBT rights in Europe
- Same-sex union court cases

== Literature ==
- Belavusau, Uladzislau (2020). "Legislative and Judicial Politics of LGBT Rights in the European Union". Oxford Research Encyclopedia of Politics. doi:10.1093/acrefore/9780190228637.013.1309. ISBN 978-0-19-022863-7.
- Cooper, Sarah Lucy (2011). "Marriage, Family, Discrimination & Contradiction: An Evaluation of the Legacy and Future of the European Court of Human Rights' Jurisprudence on LGBT Rights". German Law Journal. 12 (10): 1746–1763. doi:10.1017/S2071832200017545. ISSN 2071-8322. S2CID 151203522.
- D’Amico, Marilisa; Nardocci, Costanza (2016). "LGBT rights and the way forward: the evolution of the case law of the ECtHR in relation to transgender individuals' identity". ERA Forum. 17 (2): 191–202. doi:10.1007/s12027-016-0431-6. ISSN 1863-9038. S2CID 157348781.
- D'Amico, Marilisa; Nardocci, Costanza (2017). "Homosexuality and Human Rights After Oliari v. Italy". Same-Sex Relationships and Beyond: Gender Matters in the EU (3 ed.). Intersentia. pp. 163–178. ISBN 978-1-78068-495-6.
- Doty, Kathleen A. (2009). "From Frette to E.B.: The European Court of Human Rights on Gay and Lesbian Adoption". Law & Sexuality: A Review of Lesbian, Gay, Bisexual and Transgender Legal Issues. 18: 121.
- Guerrero, Marion (2018). Lawyering for LGBT rights in Europe : the emancipatory potential of strategic litigation at the CJEU and the ECtHR (PhD thesis). European University Institute.
- Hodson, Loveday (2019). "Sexual orientation and the European Convention on Human Rights: What of the "L" in LGBT?". Journal of Lesbian Studies. 23 (3): 383–396. doi:10.1080/10894160.2019.1598208. hdl:2381/44134. PMID 30983527. S2CID 115202084.
- Hodson, Loveday (2012). "Ties That Bind: Towards a Child-Centred Approach to Lesbian, Gay, Bi-Sexual and Transgender Families under the ECHR*". The International Journal of Children's Rights. 20 (4): 501–522. doi:10.1163/157181812X634247. ISSN 1571-8182.
- Johnson, Paul (2013). Homosexuality and the European Court of Human Rights. Routledge. ISBN 978-1-136-21896-5.
- Shahid, Masuma (2019). "How Do European Courts Approach the Sensitive Topic of Same-Sex Marriage? An Analysis of the Case Law of the ECtHR and the CJEU in the 'Catch 22'-Field of Equal Marriage Rights". European Yearbook on Human Rights 2019. Intersentia. pp. 237–260. ISBN 978-1-78068-956-2.
- Gabriel N. Toggenburg “LGBT” go Luxembourg: on the stance of Lesbian Gay Bisexual and Transgender Rights before the European Court of Justice European Law Reporter 5/2008
- LGBTI Rights before the European Court of Human Rights: One Step at a Time FIDH 2014
- Frédéric Edel Case Law of the European Court of Human Rights relating to discrimination on grounds of sexual orientation or gender identity Council of Europe, 2015
- Tobler, Christa (2014). "Equality and Non-Discrimination under the ECHR and EU Law. A Comparison Focusing on Discrimination against LGBTI Persons'". Zeitschrift für ausländisches öffentliches Recht und Völkerrecht. 74 (3): 521–561. ISSN 0044-2348.
- Temperman, Jeroen (2021). "LGBT Rights as 'Rights of Others' in Extreme Speech Cases". Religious Speech, Hatred and LGBT Rights. Brill Nijhoff. ISBN 978-90-04-45886-4.
- Wintemute, Robert (2017). "European Law Against Discrimination on Grounds of Sexual Orientation". Same-Sex Relationships and Beyond: Gender Matters in the EU (3 ed.). Intersentia. pp. 179–204. ISBN 978-1-78068-495-6.
