= Alekseyev v. Russia =

European Court of Human Rights case

Decided 21 October 2010
- Case: 4916/07, 25924/08 and 14599/09
- Chamber: First
- Language of proceedings: English
- Nationality of parties: Russia

Ruling
- Violations of Article 11, Article 13 and Article 14 of the European Convention on Human Rights
- President; Christos Rozakis
- Judges: Nina Vajić; Anatoly Kovler; Elisabeth Steiner; Khanlar Hajiyev; Dean Spielmann; Sverre Erik Jebens

Instruments cited
- European Convention on Human Rights

Case opinions
- Majority: Rozakis, joined by Vajić, Kovler, Steiner, Hajiyev, Spielmann, Jebens

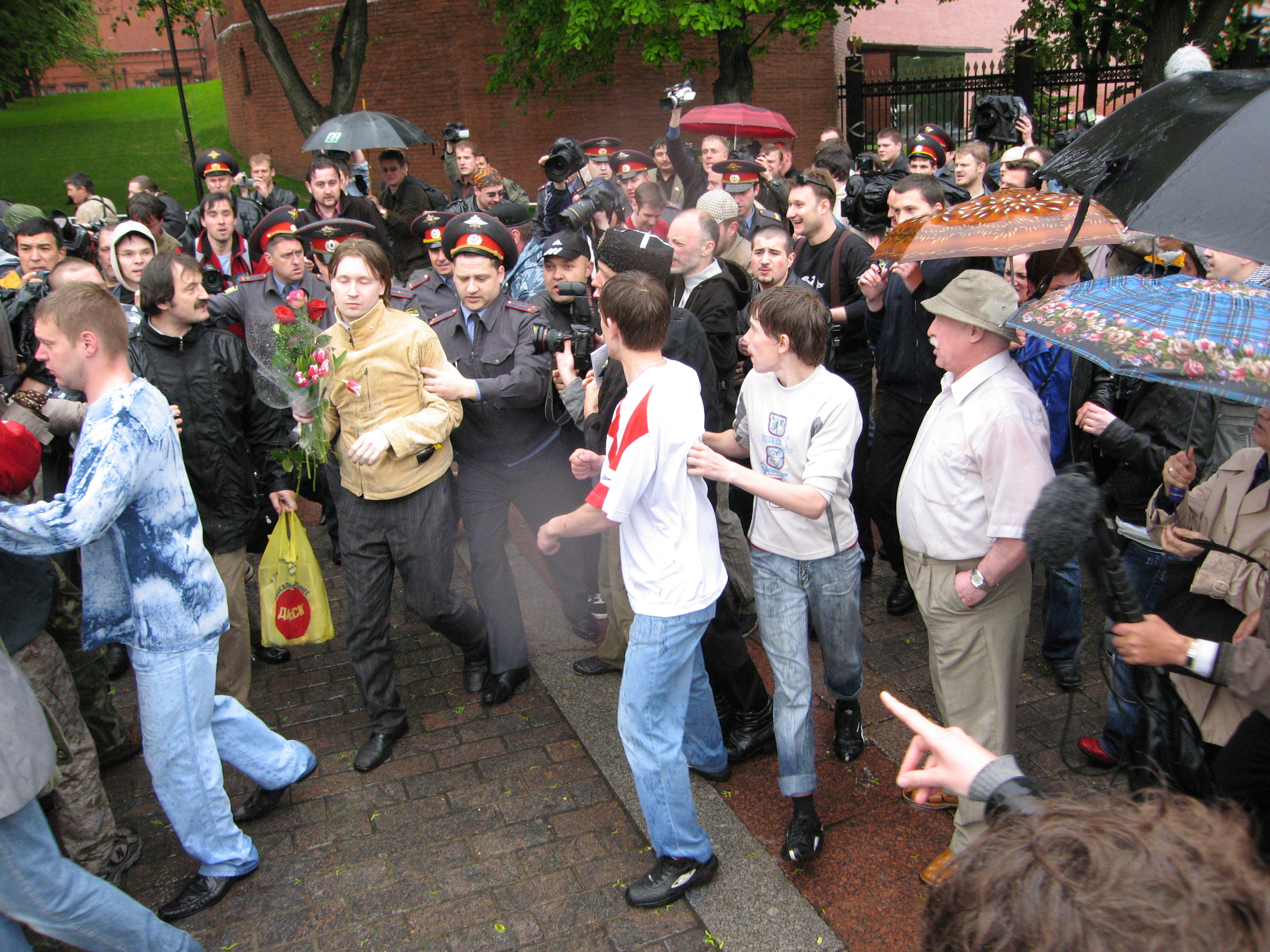
Nikolay Alexeyev, the applicant, being arrested outside the Alexander Garden on 27 May 2006

Alekseyev v. Russia is a case before the European Court of Human Rights concerning the prohibition of the 2006, 2007 and 2008 Moscow Pride gay rights marches in Russia's capital. The case was brought by Russian LGBT activist Nikolay Alexeyev, organiser of the marches, who claimed the banning of the marches had violated Article 11 (freedom of assembly) of the European Convention on Human Rights. He claimed furthermore that he had not received an effective remedy under Article 13 against the violation of Article 11, and that he had been discriminated against by the authorities in Moscow under Article 14 in their consideration of his applications to hold the marches.

The First Section of the Court, sitting as a Chamber, found unanimously that there had been violations of Articles 11, 13 and 14 of the Convention. Their judgment was issued on 21 October 2010 and a referral by the Russian government to the Grand Chamber of the Court rejected on 11 April 2011, at which point the judgment became final.

== Background ==
The Applicant, Nikolay Alexeyev (spelt by the Court, Alekseyev), born 23 December 1977 in Moscow, is a Russian LGBT rights activist, lawyer and journalist.

=== Events in 2006 ===
In 2006, the Applicant along with several others began organising a march in Moscow, the capital of Russia, to demonstrate against discrimination toward LGBT people in Russia. The march was to be held on 27 May that year, the anniversary of the legalisation of homosexuality in Russia. On 16 February, a statement was released by the Mayor of Moscow, Yury Luzhkov, stating that any proposed LGBT rights march would not be permitted to go ahead.

Notice was given by the organisers of the march to the Mayor on 15 May 2006, that around 2,000 people were expected to participate in a march from the Moscow Post Office along Myasnitskaya Street to Lubyanka Square, on 27 May starting at 3pm and lasting until 5pm. On 18 May, the organisers were informed that the Mayor had refused permission for the march on grounds of public order, for the prevention of riots and the protection of health, morals and the rights and freedoms of others.

The organisers submitted an alternative application involving only a picket in Lubyanka Square and also appealed the original refusal to a judge, however both were unsuccessful.

On 27 May 2006, when the march was intended to have been held, the Applicant along with several others attended a conference in honour of the International Day Against Homophobia and Transphobia, which had been on 17 May. They announced their intention of going to the Alexander Garden along the western length of the Kremlin Wall, and lay flowers at the Tomb of the Unknown Soldier as an act of remembrance to victims of fascism, including LGBT victims. They intended to follow this with a protest against the banning of the march with a fifteen-minute picket at the office of the Mayor of Moscow on Tverskaya Street. When the Applicant and fifteen others arrived at the Garden, they found the gates locked and some 150 policemen from the OMON riot police unit patrolling, as well as around 100 individuals protesting against the planned flower-laying. The Applicant was arrested and the other demonstrators proceeded to the Mayor's office. Around one hundred arrests were made by the OMON police officers of people attacking the LGBT demonstrators. The Applicant's account of events on this day was corroborated by reports from the International Lesbian and Gay Association (ILGA) and Human Rights Watch.

=== Events in 2007 ===
On 15 May 2007, the Applicant and other individuals submitted another application to the Mayor's office to hold a similar march to that proposed the year before, this time with an estimated attendance of five thousand one hundred people. This application was refused, and an alternative submitted proposing a picket before the Mayor's residence in Tverskaya Street and another in Novopushkinskiy Park, both of which were denied. On 27 May, the Applicant along with around twenty others attempted to deliver a petition against the prohibition of demonstration to the Mayor's office, but was detained by police along with two other men. He was convicted of the administrative offence of disobeying a lawful order from the police and fined one thousand roubles.

=== Events in 2008 ===
On 18 April 2008, the Applicant along with other organisers submitted notice of ten intended marches to be held on 1 and 2 May 2008. All were refused on public safety grounds, and the organisers submitted another fifteen applications for marches on 3 and 5 May, all of which were refused for the same reasons. The Applicant then submitted a raft of other proposals, including one to the recently elected President of Russia, Dmitry Medvedev, stating his intention to hold a march in the Alexander Garden on 31 May 2008, to which he received no reply.

The Applicant appealed all of the refusals unsuccessfully, and attempted to organise a picket for 17 May calling for criminal charges to be brought against the Mayor for banning the marches. Permission for this was refused on 13 May on the same grounds as previously, however the organisers managed to hold a picket for around ten minutes on Bolshaya Nikitskaya Street near the Mayor's residence.

== Judgment ==
Alexeyev applied to the European Court of Human Rights, claiming the events surrounding the attempted marches in 2006 - 2008 had violated his right to freedom of assembly under Article 11 of the European Convention on Human Rights. He also claimed that he had not been able to access an effective remedy for the violation of Article 11, a violation of Article 13; and that the refusal to allow the marches to go forward had been discriminatory, in that it was made on the basis of his and other participants' sexual orientation, a violation of Article 14 in conjunction with Article 11.

The Court unanimously found violations of all three articles.

=== Article 11 (freedom of assembly) ===
Government's submissions
The Government claimed that domestic law allowed for the restriction of assembly on safety grounds, and that the circumstances of the Applicant's proposed marches and strength of public opinion against them would have meant a high risk of violence. They claimed Article 11 must be interpreted as allowing governments a broad margin of appreciation, as this was required to accommodate the cultural situation of homosexuality in Russia. The Government also claimed that it had been necessary to ban the event for the protection of morals, referring prominent religious organisations' opposition to the march, and that, as there was no consensus between member states as to the legitimacy of homosexuality within society, national authorities were better placed than the European Court to determine the conditions for such events.

Applicant's submissions
The Applicant responded that the provisions used to ban the marches applied only to the safety and suitability of proposed venues rather than to a general risk of violence, and that the authorities on refusing an application for these reasons were obliged to suggest an alternative venue, which had not been done. He further contended that the Government's definition of morals was incorrect, as it referred only to majoritarian public opinion without regard to the concepts of pluralism or diversity. Furthermore, the proposed marches would not have been a threat to morals as they were concerned with human rights and civil liberties and would not have involved any sexually provocative content. He claimed the Government's references to public safety were unsubstantiated as they had not demonstrated an assessed risk of violence. He claimed finally that the sweeping nature of the ban was disproportionate and could not be justified on the grounds that it may have shocked or confused some parts of society (Bączkowski v Poland).

Findings of the Court
The Court found it unnecessary to consider the legitimate aim or domestic lawfulness of the ban as it had found the ban did not satisfy the requirement of being necessary in a democratic society.

The Court reiterated that Article 11 includes within it protection for assemblies which may be at risk of attack from groups who disagree with or are offended by the assembly's aims or purpose. (para.73) The Government had referred inter alia to a statement opposing the ban by the head Muslim cleric in Nizhniy Novgorod (Russia's fourth-largest city), that, "as a matter of necessity, homosexuals must be stoned to death", as evidence of the likely public disorder which would result from the march. The Court found that, "[b]y relying on such blatantly unlawful calls as grounds for the ban, the authorities effectively endorsed the intentions of persons and organisations that clearly and deliberately intended to disrupt a peaceful demonstration in breach of the law and public order." (para.76)

The Court found the ban disproportionate to the Government's stated aim of protecting children and vulnerable adults from homosexual propaganda. It also dismissed the Government's claim that the march should have been banned for conflicting with religious doctrine and the moral values of the majority. It stated that, if a minority group's exercise of rights guaranteed under the Convention were made conditional upon acceptance of that group by the societal majority, it would be "incompatible with the underlying values of the Convention" (para.81).

The Court responded to the statement by the Government that there was a lack of consensus between member states as to the legitimacy of homosexuality, stating there was a long-standing consensus on such matters as legalisation of homosexual activity (Dudgeon v United Kingdom), homosexuals in the military (Smith and Grady v United Kingdom), parental rights, succession to tenancies (Karner v Austria), and equal ages of consent (S. L. v. Austria). While issues such as adoption by same-sex couples and access to same-sex marriage were yet to be brought to consensus, the Court found there was "no ambiguity about the other member States' recognition of the right of individuals to openly identify themselves as gay, lesbian or any other sexual minority, and to promote their rights and freedoms, in particular by exercising their freedom of peaceful assembly." (para.84)

The Court found that the Government had taken no steps to assess the risk posed should the marches have gone ahead. It stated, "The only factor taken into account by the Moscow authorities was the public opposition to the event, and the officials' own views on morals." (para.85) The Government had failed to demonstrate any pressing social need to ban such demonstrations for any of the reasons it had given. The Court therefore found the ban not to have been necessary in a democratic society, and to have been a violation of the right to freedom of assembly under Article 11.

=== Article 13 (effective remedy) ===
Article 13 requires that within a member state a competent national authority must be able to provide a suitable domestic remedy to an aggrieved party, both to deal with the substance of the relevant Convention complaint and to grant appropriate relief. As the Applicant's Article 11 right had been violated, he was entitled to such relief under Article 13.

The Court stated that, in the circumstances, an appropriate remedy would have been for the Applicant to have been able to obtain a court ruling concerning the authorisation of the march before it was intended to take place. The Court found that the judicial remedies which had been available to the Applicant in the circumstances were of a post-hoc nature and could not have provided adequate redress to the Applicant, and that there had therefore been a violation of Article 13 (para. 99).

=== Article 14 (discrimination) ===
Article 14 protects against discrimination in access to rights under the Convention. Because it relates to access to rights, it can only be used in conjunction with another article, in this case Article 11.

Parties' submissions
The Government claimed that the antagonistic nature of the relationship between sexual minorities and religious groups in Russia meant it was necessary to place restrictions on the exercise of certain rights. The Applicant responded that the ban was discriminatory as it had been put in place due to the government of Moscow's disapproval of the participants' homosexuality. He referred to reference made by the Government to the disapproval of religious groups towards the march, and to comments made in the media by the Mayor of Moscow which were unfavourable towards homosexuality.

Findings of the Court
The Court stated that homosexuality was a ground for discrimination under Article 14, and that the margin of appreciation afforded to member states in this regard was narrow. It was necessary to show not just that measures taken were "suitable in general", but that they were "necessary in the circumstances" (para.108), and that if the sole reason put forward by a member state for restrictions on access to the Convention rights were the victims' homosexuality, it would amount to discrimination under Article 14. The Court found on the facts that the march participants' sexual orientation had been the main reason for banning the events, and that there had therefore been a violation of Article 14 in conjunction with Article 11.

=== Just satisfaction ===
The Applicant had claimed €40,000 in non-pecuniary damages, of which the Government was ordered to pay €12,000, as well as €17,510 in costs.

== See also ==
- Nikolay Alexeyev (Applicant)
- LGBT rights in Russia
- Bączkowski v Poland (prohibition LGBT march in Warsaw)
- List of LGBT-related European Court of Human Rights cases
- Recent academic article, "Homosexuality, Freedom of Assembly and the Margin of Appreciation Doctrine of the European Court of Human Rights: Alekseyev v Russia", in Human Rights Law Review
