= LGBTQ rights in Cyprus =

- Location of Cyprus (dark green) – in Europe (light green & dark grey) – in the European Union (light green) – [Legend]
- Legal status: Legal since 1998, age of consent equalised in 2002
- Military: Allowed to serve openly
- Discrimination protections: Sexual orientation and gender identity protections (see below)

Family rights
- Recognition of relationships: Same-sex unions since 2015
- Adoption: Not allowed

Lesbian, gay, bisexual, and transgender (LGBT) rights in Cyprus have evolved in recent years, but LGBTQ people still face legal challenges not experienced by non-LGBT residents. Both male and female expressions of same-sex sexual activity were decriminalised in 1998, and civil unions which grant several of the rights and benefits of marriage have been legal since December 2015. Conversion therapy was banned in Cyprus in May 2023. However, adoption rights in Cyprus are reserved for heterosexual couples only.

Traditionally, the socially conservative Greek Orthodox Church has had significant influence over public opinion and politics regarding LGBT rights. However, ever since Cyprus sought membership in the European Union, it had to change its human rights legislation, including its laws regarding sexual orientation and gender identity. Attitudes towards members of the LGBT community are evolving and becoming increasingly more accepting and tolerant, with a recent opinion poll showing that a majority of Cypriots now support same-sex marriage.

== Law regarding same-sex sexual activity ==
Cyprus fell under the control of the Ottoman Empire in 1571.

Although administered by the British Empire from 1878, Cyprus remained officially part of the Ottoman Empire until 1914, when it was annexed by the British Empire following the decision of the Ottoman Turks to side with Germany in the First World War. Even then, Cyprus was not officially claimed by the British Empire until 1925, following recognition of British ownership of the island by the newly created Republic of Turkey through the Treaty of Lausanne, signed by Britain and Turkey in 1923. Up until this time, Ottoman laws were technically in force on the island, albeit administered by local and British colonial officials, and in respect to homosexuality, Ottoman Turkish law had been liberalised in 1858, when it had ceased to be a criminal offence throughout the Ottoman Empire.

Although Britain assumed full legal ownership of Cyprus in 1925, Ottoman law was not formally replaced on the island until 1929, when Ottoman legal tolerance of homosexuality was finally ended, with the incorporation of the British Criminal Law Amendment Act 1885 into Cyprus law. For the first time since 1858, this made male homosexuality a criminal act in Cyprus. Female homosexuality was not recognised or mentioned in the law.

With independence from Britain in 1960, Cyprus retained British colonial law on the island almost in its entirety, with the relevant parts of the Criminal Law Amendment Act 1885 becoming articles 171 to 174 of Chapter 154 of the Cypriot Criminal Code. The articles were first challenged in 1993, when Alexandros Modinos, a Cypriot architect and gay rights activist, won a legal court case against the Government of Cyprus, known as Modinos v. Cyprus, at the European Court of Human Rights. The Court ruled that section 171 of the Criminal Code of Cyprus violated Modinos's right to a private life, protected under the European Convention on Human Rights, an international agreement ratified by Cyprus in 1962.

Despite the legal ruling, Cyprus did not formally revise its Criminal Code to comply with the ruling until 1998. Even then, the age of consent for homosexual conduct was set at eighteen, while that for heterosexual conduct was at sixteen. Aside from the unequal age of consent, the revised Criminal Code also made it a crime to "promote" homosexuality, which was used to restrict the LGBT rights movement. In 2000, the discriminatory ban on "promoting" homosexuality was lifted, and the age of consent was equalised in 2002. Today, the universal age of consent is seventeen.

The Cyprus military used to ban homosexuals from serving on the grounds that homosexuality is a "mental illness". However, this ground of exclusion has since been removed.

In Northern Cyprus, Turkish Cypriot deputies passed an amendment on 27 January 2014, repealing a colonial-era law that punished homosexual acts with up to five years' imprisonment. It was the last territory in Europe to decriminalise sexual relations between consenting adult men. In response to the vote, Paulo Corte-Real from the International Lesbian, Gay, Bisexual, Trans and Intersex Association, a rights advocacy group, said that "We welcome today's vote and can finally call Europe a continent completely free from laws criminalising homosexuality".

== Recognition of same-sex relationships ==
The current law of Cyprus only recognises marriage as a union between one man and one woman. There is no official recognition of same-sex marriages. Since 2015, same-sex couples have been able to have their relationships recognised through civil unions.

On 26 November 2015, a civil union bill was passed by the House of Representatives with 39 in favour, 12 against and 3 abstentions. The law was published on 9 December 2015, and took effect that same day.

== Discrimination protections ==
In 2004, Cyprus implemented an anti-discrimination law that explicitly forbids discrimination on the basis of sexual orientation in employment. The law, known as the Equal Treatment in Employment and Occupation Law 2004 (Greek: Ο Περί 'Ισης Μεταχείρισης στην Απασχόληση και την Εργασία Νόμος του 2004), was designed to comply with the European Union's Employment Framework Directive of 2000. Discrimination based on gender identity in general and discrimination based on sexual orientation in areas other than employment are not prohibited.

The Cypriot Penal Code has been amended to make violence against LGBT people an aggravating factor in sentencing. Article 99 of the code, entitled "Incitement to violence or hatred due to sexual orientation or gender identity", provides for imprisonment not exceeding three years or to a fine not exceeding 5,000 euros for any person who "intentionally, publicly or in manner which is threatening or insulting or offensive in nature, urges or incites, orally or in writing, violence or hatred against a group, person, or a member of a group of persons on the basis of sexual orientation or gender identity". In October 2024, Parliament raised the penalty for hate speech based on sexual orientation or gender identity from €5,000 to €10,000.

Despite the provisions, reports of incitement to hatred or violence against LGBT people occasionally result in no action by police forces nor any legal penalties, most notably when committed by clergy of the Greek Orthodox Church. In February 2019, a gay man was attacked in Nicosia, but the police failed to establish whether it was a hate crime. Another incident, also in Nicosia, four months later also resulted in no police action.

In 2017, the Ministry of Education established the programme "HOMBAT-Combating Homophobic and Transphobic Bullying at Schools" to train and sensibilise teachers and professors to bullying and harassment directed at LGBT students.

As part of its Universal Periodic Review in 2019, Cyprus received seven recommendations pertaining to LGBT rights, including combating discrimination and violence, criminalising harassment, adopting an action plan against homophobia and transphobia, and adopting a gender recognition law. It accepted all seven recommendations.

== Conversion therapy ==
On 25 May 2023, the Cyprus Parliament voted to criminalize conversion therapy.

== Gender identity and expression ==
In November 2017, President Nicos Anastasiades met advocacy group Accept-LGBT Cyprus to discuss issues concerning transgender rights. A bill to allow transgender people to change their legal sex has been drafted, with the support of the President and the Justice Minister. On 10 June 2019, following months of stalling and delay, four parents of transgender children spoke in favor of the bill and urged for its "speedy adoption". The legislation would allow transgender people over 18 the right to change their legal gender on the basis of self-determination, without a diagnosis, hormonal treatment or sex reassignment surgery.

== Living conditions ==
In 1996, a criminal trial against Father Pancratios Meraklis, who was accused of sodomy, caused serious rioting that stopped the proceedings. Meraklis had been regarded as a possible bishop, but was blocked by then Archbishop of Cyprus, Chrysostomos I of Cyprus, who believed Meraklis to be homosexual and that AIDS could be spread through casual conduct. These comments irked public health officials and more open-minded Cyprus citizens.

In 2003, a 28-year-old Cypriot man was barred from getting a driver's license because he was regarded as "psychologically unstable". The man had been discharged from the military for homosexuality, which the military then classified as a mental illness.

In April 2019, the Ministry of Foreign Affairs sent instructions in all embassies, requesting that they support local LGBT activists. On 17 May, the International Day Against Homophobia, the ministry raised the rainbow flag, as did several Cypriot embassies throughout the world.

The "gay-scene" continues to grow in Cyprus. Bars, clubs and other gay-friendly establishments are found in several cities, including Paphos, Limassol, Larnaca and Nicosia, although Paphos is the only city with the longest running gay bar called Different Bar since 1993. Other cities have tried to open bars and clubs, with less success. (Paphos has, in contrast to these other locations, a large, gay touristic influence since the late 1970s).

== LGBT rights movement in Cyprus ==
In 1987, Alecos Modinos formed the Cypriot Gay Liberation Movement (AKOK or Apeleftherotiko Kinima Omofilofilon Kiprou). As the first LGBT rights organisation in the nation, it successfully pushed European Court of Human Rights to force the decriminalisation of homosexuality.

In 2007, Initiative Against Homophobia was established in Northern Cyprus to campaign for the rights of LGBT people in the north. On 25 April 2008, the group presented a proposal regarding the revising of criminal law to the head of parliament, Fatma Ekenoglu. In 2010, representatives of ILGA-Europe presented the proposal to the new head of parliament, Hasan Bozer. However, no action was taken on the proposal and people continued to be arrested under claims of "unnatural sex". In October 2011, the Communal Democracy Party (TDP) presented the same proposal to the Parliament with the demand of urgently decriminalising homosexuality in Northern Cyprus. Since March 2012, Initiative Against Homophobia has continued its activities with the name Queer Cyprus Association (Turkish: Kuir Kıbrıs Derneği).

Accept-LGBT Cyprus (Accept-ΛΟΑΤ Κύπρου) was the first organisation to be officially registered in Cyprus dealing with LGBT rights, on 8 September 2011. It has the support of many citizens, assisted by various NGOs, the European Parliament and foreign embassies operating in Cyprus. The organisation has also had at times assistance from local municipalities and often had events held under the auspices of local city mayors.

Accept-LGBT Cyprus organised the first pride parade in the areas controlled by the Republic on 31 May 2014. The parade was successful with over 4,500 marching or attending the day's events. The group had expected several hundred participants, but were overwhelmed by the event's popularity. The march received extensive political support from almost all parties across the political spectrum, as well as support from former President George Vasiliou, the European Parliament's Office in Cyprus, the European Commission's Representation in Cyprus and 15 embassies who marched with the parade including ambassadors and embassy staff (Austria, Australia, Brazil, Canada, Denmark, Finland, Israel, Italy, the Netherlands, Norway, Portugal, Spain, Sweden, the United Kingdom and the United States). Furthermore, the embassies of Denmark, Finland, the Netherlands, Sweden and the United States hoisted a rainbow flag. Cypriot-born, international pop singer Anna Vissi also attended the march. The 81-year-old Alexandros Modinos, who won a 1993 European Court of Human Rights case against Cyprus for its laws criminalising homosexuality, headed the procession. Scuffles broke out between a group of Eastern Orthodox Christian protesters including clerics who denounced the event they called "shameful", demonstrating outside the Parliament. During a press release, Accept-LGBT Cyprus President Costa Gavrielides expressed his surprise and joy at the turnout. The event was preceded by the Cyprus Pride Festival, which took place between 17 May 2014 (International Day Against Homophobia) and 31 May 2014. The first day of the event a Rainbow Walk took place to the north of Nicosia with the collaboration of Accept-LGBT Cyprus and the Turkish Cypriot organisation Queer Cyprus Association, amongst others.

Queer Collective Cy was formed in the early part of 2022. The collective describes itself as a community-driven, grassroots organisation which aims to promote empowerment within the local community across the island, fight against discrimination related to gender identity, gender expression and sexual orientation. On 18 June 2022 they successfully co-organised and co-hosted the first-ever Intercommunal Pride on the island with the slogan United by Pride, together with the groups Queer Cyprus, LGBT Pilipinas, LGBT Africa and LGBT+ and Friends UCY Student Club. The event was warmly welcomed as the first of its kind bringing together various LGBTQI+ communities on the island. It consisted of two separate marches one from the South of Nicosia beginning from Freedom Square (Plateia Eleftherias) and one from the North of Nicosia which began from Kugulu Park. Both marches ended in the UN Buffer Zone, where in a strong act of symbolism sewed together two pride flags that were carried throughout both respective marches.

In Northern Cyprus in 2008, Shortbus Movement (Turkish: Shortbus Hareketi), consisting of human rights activists, was founded. It takes action to support LGBTQ rights in Northern Cyprus. The group secured financial support from the European Commission Office in Cyprus and the European Parliament. It has also organised many activities to empower and mobilise members of LGBT community, by increasing awareness through sharing related information, providing informational, educational, psychological and legal services to the LGBTI community and organising and/or supporting LGBTI, gender equality and human rights thematic cultural events.

Other LGBT events and activities, providing awareness of LGBT people, have been held in Paphos and Geroskipou.

== Media discrimination ==
In December 2021, when the Greek series Agries Melisses (Greek: Άγριες Μέλισσες) aired on ANT1 Cyprus, a scene featuring two male characters kissing – played by Dimitris Tsiklis and Giorgos Korobilis – was censored from the Cypriot broadcast. According to ANT1 Cyprus, the kiss was censored due to "legislative ambiguity" regarding radio and television regulations, despite there being "no general direction or legislation banning the broadcast of any LGBTI content". This decision drew criticism from activists and on social media, who pointed out that a violent scene featuring one of the two men being half-naked, bloodied, and tortured by his boyfriend's father was left intact in the broadcast. Furthermore, the show's broadcast was changed from 9 P.M. to 10:30 P.M., which activists state is not coincidental.

According to LGBT rights activist Fotis Fotiou and former member of the organization Accept-LGBT Cyprus, the country has a history of LGBT content being censored by both local television networks and theater plays.

== Public opinion ==
Most Cyprus citizens are members of the Greek Orthodox Church of Cyprus which opposes LGBT rights. In 2000, a Major Holy Synod had to be convened to investigate rumours that Bishop Athansassios of Limassol had engaged in a homosexual relationship with a novice monk. The charges were eventually dropped.

A 2006 survey showed that 75% of Cypriots disapproved of homosexuality, and many thought that it can be "cured". A 2006 E.U. poll revealed that only 14% of Cypriots were in favour of same-sex marriage, with 10% also in favour of adoption.

This situation has seen a rapid change in just a few years, with a 2014 survey finding that 53.3% of Cypriot citizens thought civil unions should be made legal.

The 2015 Eurobarometer found that 37% of Cypriots thought that same-sex marriage should be allowed throughout Europe, 56% were against.

The 2023 Eurobarometer found that 50% of Cypriots thought same-sex marriage should be allowed throughout Europe while 44% disagreed, and 46% agreed that "there is nothing wrong in a sexual relationship between two persons of the same sex". This was the first time a majority of Cypriots supported same-sex marriage in a Eurobarometer, showing a steady increase in support for LGBT rights.

== US Human rights reports ==
In 2017, the United States Department of State reported the following, concerning the status of LGBT rights in Cyprus:

- Freedom of Expression, Including for the Press
  "Freedom of Expression: The law criminalizes incitement to hatred and violence based on race, color, religion, genealogical origin, national or ethnic origin, or sexual orientation. Such acts are punishable by up to five years' imprisonment, a fine of up to 10,000 euros ($12,000), or both. In 2015 police examined 11 complaints of verbal assault and/or hate speech based on ethnic origin, religion, sexual orientation, and color. Authorities opened criminal prosecutions in five cases that are currently pending trial."
- Acts of Violence, Discrimination, and Other Abuses Based on Sexual Orientation and Gender Identity
  "Antidiscrimination laws exist and prohibit direct or indirect discrimination based on sexual orientation or gender identity. Antidiscrimination laws cover employment and the following activities in the public and private domain: social protection, social insurance, social benefits, health care, education, participation in unions and professional organizations, and access to goods and services. An LGBTI NGO noted in February that equality and antidiscrimination legislation remained fragmented and failed to adequately address discrimination against LGBTI persons. NGOs dealing with LGBTI matters claimed that housing benefits favored "traditional" families. Hate crime laws criminalize incitement to hatred or violence based on sexual orientation or gender identity.
  Despite legal protections, LGBTI individuals faced significant societal discrimination. As a result, many LGBTI persons were not open about their sexual orientation or gender identity, nor did they report homophobic violence or discrimination. There were reports of employment discrimination against LGBTI applicants."
- Discrimination with Respect to Employment and Occupation
  "Laws and regulations prohibit direct or indirect discrimination with respect to employment or occupation on the basis of race, national origin or citizenship, sex, religion, political opinion, gender, age, disability, and sexual orientation. The government did not effectively enforce these laws or regulations. Discrimination in employment and occupation occurred with respect to race, gender, disability, sexual orientation, and HIV-positive status. Penalties provided by the law were sufficient to deter violations.
  A survey published in the International Journal of Manpower in 2014 suggested that LGBTI job applicants faced significant bias compared with heterosexual applicants. The survey found that gay male applicants, who made their sexual orientation clear on their job application, were 39 per cent less likely to get a job interview than equivalent male applicants who did not identify themselves as gay. Employers were 42.7 per cent less likely to grant a job interview to openly lesbian applicants than to equivalent heterosexual female applicants."

== Summary table ==
Right	Yes/No	Notes
Same-sex sexual activity
Same-sex sexual activity legal		Since 1998
Equal age of consent (17)		Since 2002
Same-sex relationships
Civil partnerships		Since 2015
Same-sex marriage		
Adoption and family planning
Stepchild adoption by same-sex couples		
Joint adoption by same-sex couples		
Access to IVF for lesbians		
Same-sex couples as both parents on a birth certificate		
Commercial surrogacy for gay male couples		Banned regardless of sexual orientation
Military service
LGBT people allowed to serve openly in military		
Transgender rights
Right to change legal gender		Legal but the applicant must not be married
Discrimination protections
Anti-discrimination laws in employment only		Since 2004 for sexual orientation
Anti-discrimination laws in the provision of goods and services		
Anti-discrimination laws in all other areas (incl. indirect discrimination, hate speech)		Since 2015
Anti-discrimination laws covering gender identity		
Hate crime law includes sexual orientation and gender identity		Since 2017
LGBT sex education and relationships taught in schools		Since 2022
MSMs allowed to donate blood		Since 2022
Conversion therapy banned		Since 2023

== See also ==
- Human rights in Cyprus
- LGBT rights in Europe
- LGBT rights in Asia
- LGBT rights in the European Union
- Recognition of same-sex unions in Cyprus
- Same-sex union court cases

== Sources and external links ==
- "Official website of Accept-LGBT" (in Greek).
- "Rainbow Europe: Cyprus". ILGA-Europe. 20 February 2024.
- "Official website of Shortbus Movement" (in Turkish). Archived from the original on 11 July 2017.
- "Official website of Queer Cyprus Association" (in Turkish).
