= Queer =

Term for sexual and gender minorities

Queer is an umbrella term for sexual and gender minorities. It is alternately used to refer to people who reject sexual and gender norms and share radical politics characterized by solidarity across lines of identity. Queer is also a self-identity term for many people (similar to but distinct from gay, lesbian, and bisexual), characterized by rejection or disruption of binary categories of sexual orientation and gender.

Originally meaning 'strange' or 'peculiar', queer came to be used pejoratively against LGBTQ people in the late 19th century. From the late 1980s, queer activists began to reclaim the word as a neutral or positive self-description. In the 21st century, queer became increasingly used to describe a broad spectrum of non-heteronormative sexual or gender identities and politics. Academic disciplines such as queer theory and queer studies have emerged to examine a wide variety of issues, either informed by this type of perspective, or to examine the lives of LGBTQ people. These share a general opposition to binarism, normativity, and a perceived lack of intersectionality, some of them connected only tangentially to the LGBTQ movement. Queer arts, queer cultural groups, and queer political groups are examples of modern expressions of queer identities.

Critics include LGBTQ community members who associate the term more with its colloquial, derogatory usage; those who wish to dissociate themselves from queer radicalism; and those who see it as too amorphous or trendy. Supporters of the term include those who use it to contrast with a more assimilationist part of the gay rights movement, and to signify greater willingness to defy societal norms in pursuit of gender and sexual identity liberation. They may associate it with the advancement of radical perspectives that were also present within past gay liberation movements, such as anti-consumerism or anti-imperialism, or with events such as the Stonewall rebellion.

Queer is used in a number of ways that overlap and sometimes conflict—it is used as an umbrella term, as a political identity, and as a personal identity or "anti-identity". It is sometimes expanded to include any non-normative sexuality expression. Some people self-identify as queer due to the relative ambiguity of the term and its rejection of explicit categorization, compared to labels such as lesbian and gay. PFLAG states that as such a personal identity, queer is "valued by some for its defiance, by some because it can be inclusive of the entire community, and by others who find it to be an appropriate term to describe their more fluid identities". Recent studies have found that 5–20% of non-heterosexuals and 21–36% of transgender, nonbinary, and gender nonconforming people identify as queer.

== Origins and early use ==
Entering the English language in the 16th century, queer originally meant 'strange', 'odd', 'peculiar', or 'eccentric'. It might refer to something suspicious or "not quite right", or to a person with mild derangement or who exhibits socially inappropriate behaviour. The Northern English expression "there's nowt so queer as folk", meaning "there is nothing as strange as people", employs this meaning. Related meanings of queer include a feeling of unwellness or something that is questionable or suspicious. In the 1922 comic monologue "My Word, You Do Look Queer", the word is taken to mean "unwell". The expression "in Queer street" is used in the United Kingdom for someone in financial trouble. Over time, queer acquired a number of meanings related to sexuality and gender, from narrowly meaning "gay or lesbian" to referring to those who are "not heterosexual" to referring to those who are either not heterosexual or not cisgender (those who are LGBTQ+). The term is still widely used in Hiberno-English with its original meaning as well as to provide adverbial emphasis (very, extremely).

=== Early pejorative use ===
By the late 19th century, queer was beginning to gain a connotation of sexual deviance, used to refer to feminine men or men who were thought to have engaged in same-sex relationships. An early recorded usage of the word in this sense was in an 1894 letter by John Douglas, 9th Marquess of Queensberry, as read aloud at the trial of Oscar Wilde.

Queer was used in mainstream society by the early 20th century, along with fairy and faggot, as a pejorative term to refer to men who were perceived as flamboyant. This was, as historian George Chauncey notes, "the predominant image of all queers within the straight mind".

Starting in the underground gay bar scene in the 1950s, then moving more into the open in the 1960s and 1970s, the homophile identity was gradually displaced by a more radicalized gay identity. At that time gay was generally an umbrella term including lesbians, as well as gay-identified bisexuals and transsexuals; gender nonconformity, which had always been an indicator of gayness, also became more open during this time. During the endonymic shifts from invert to homophile to gay, queer was usually pejoratively applied to men who were believed to engage in receptive or passive anal or oral sex with other men as well as those who exhibited non-normative gender expressions.

=== Early 20th-century queer identity ===
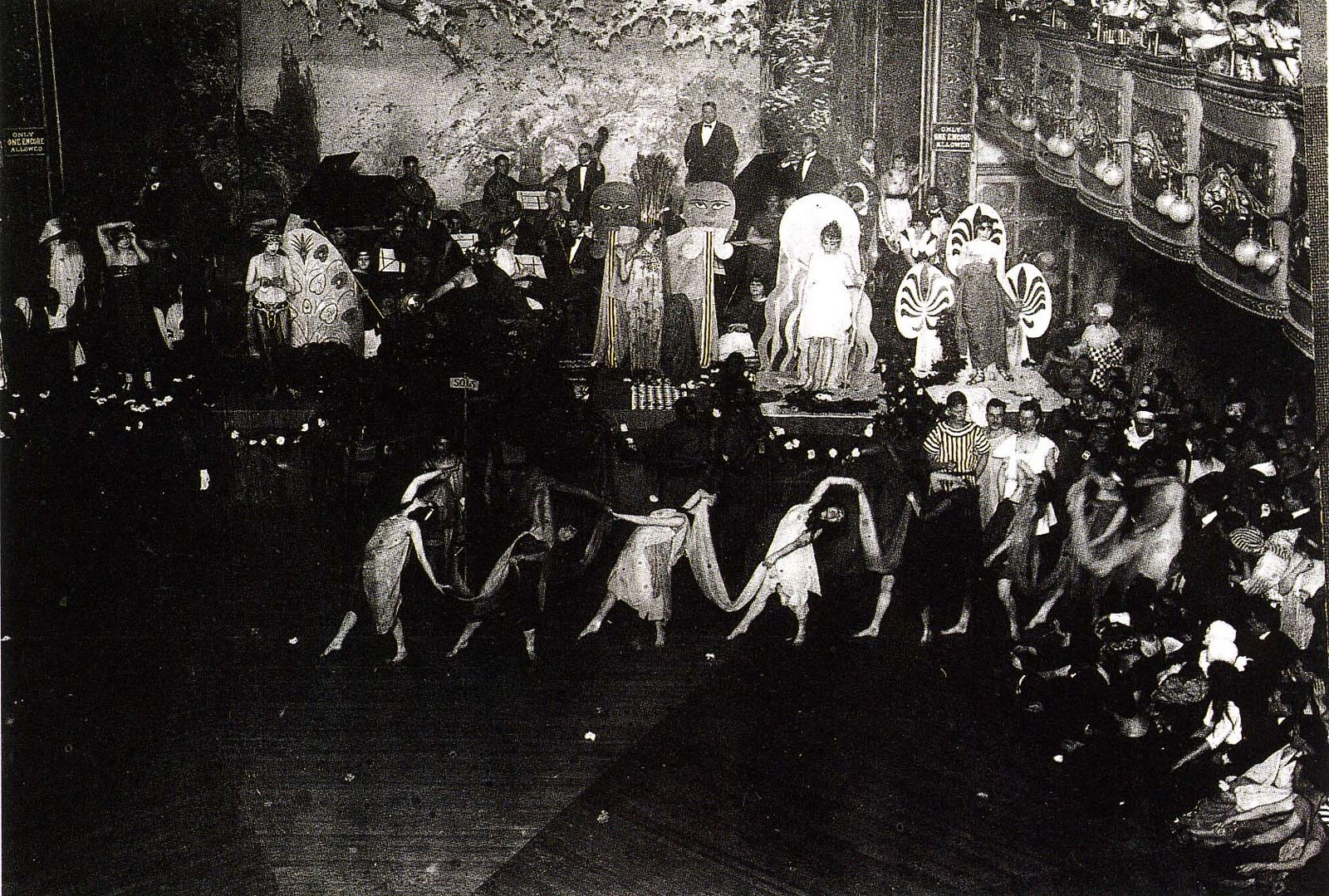
Drag Ball in Webster Hall, c. 1920s. Many queer-identifying men distanced themselves from the "flagrant" public image of gay men as effeminate "fairies".

In the late 19th and early 20th centuries, queer, fairy, trade, and gay signified distinct social categories within the gay male subculture. In his book Gay New York, Chauncey noted that queer was used as a within-community identity term by men who were stereotypically masculine. Many queer-identified men at the time were, according to Chauncey, "repelled by the style of the fairy and his loss of manly status, and almost all were careful to distinguish themselves from such men", especially because the dominant straight culture did not acknowledge such distinctions. Groups of men – such as Henry James and E. M. Forster – also discreetly gave the term queer homoerotic subtext. Trade referred to straight men who would engage in same-sex activity; Chauncey describes trade as "the 'normal men' [queers] claimed to be".

In contrast to the terms used within the subculture, medical practitioners and police officers tended to use medicalized or pathological terms like "invert", "pervert", "degenerate", and "homosexual".

None of the terms, whether inside or outside of the subculture, equated to the general concept of a homosexual identity, which emerged only with the ascension of a binary (heterosexual/homosexual) understanding of sexual orientation in the 1930s and 1940s. As this binary became embedded into the social fabric, queer began to decline as an acceptable identity in the subculture.

Similar to the earlier use of queer, gay was adopted by many U.S. assimilationist men in the mid-20th century as a means of asserting their normative status and rejecting any associations with effeminacy. The idea that queer was a pejorative term became more prevalent among younger gay men following World War II. As the gay identity became more widely adopted in the community, some men who preferred to identify as gay began chastising older men who still referred to themselves as queer by the late 1940s:

In calling themselves gay, a new generation of men insisted on the right to name themselves, to claim their status as men, and to reject the "effeminate" styles of the older generation. [...] Younger men found it easier to forget the origins of gay in the campy banter of the very queens whom they wished to reject.

In other parts of the world, particularly England, queer continued to be the dominant term used by the community well into the mid-twentieth century, as noted by historical sociologist Jeffrey Weeks:

By the 1950s and 1960s to say "I am queer" was to tell of who and what you were, and how you positioned yourself in relation to the dominant, "normal" society. … It signaled the general perception of same-sex desire as something eccentric, strange, abnormal, and perverse.

== Reclamation ==
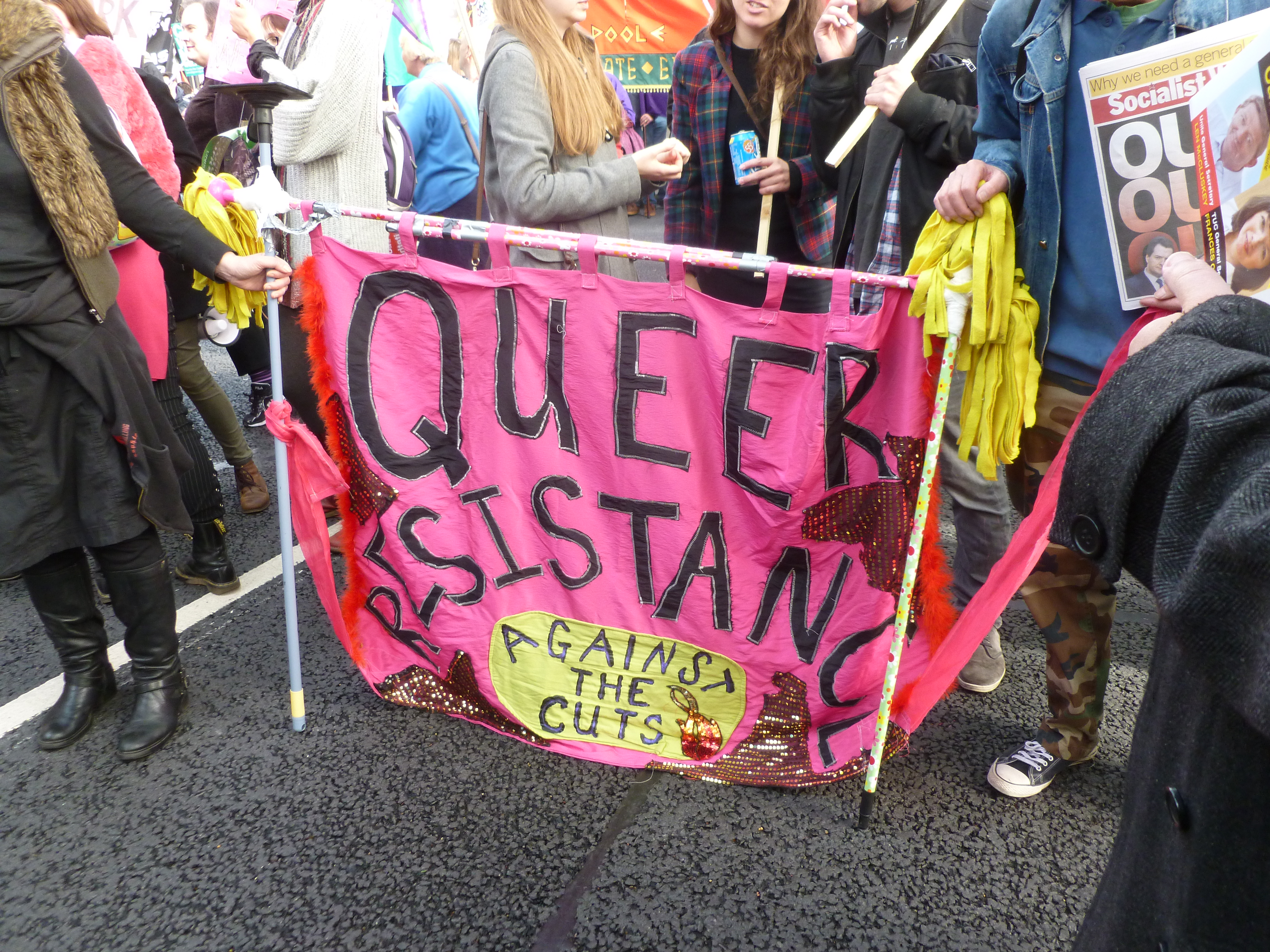
Queer resistance banner at a march

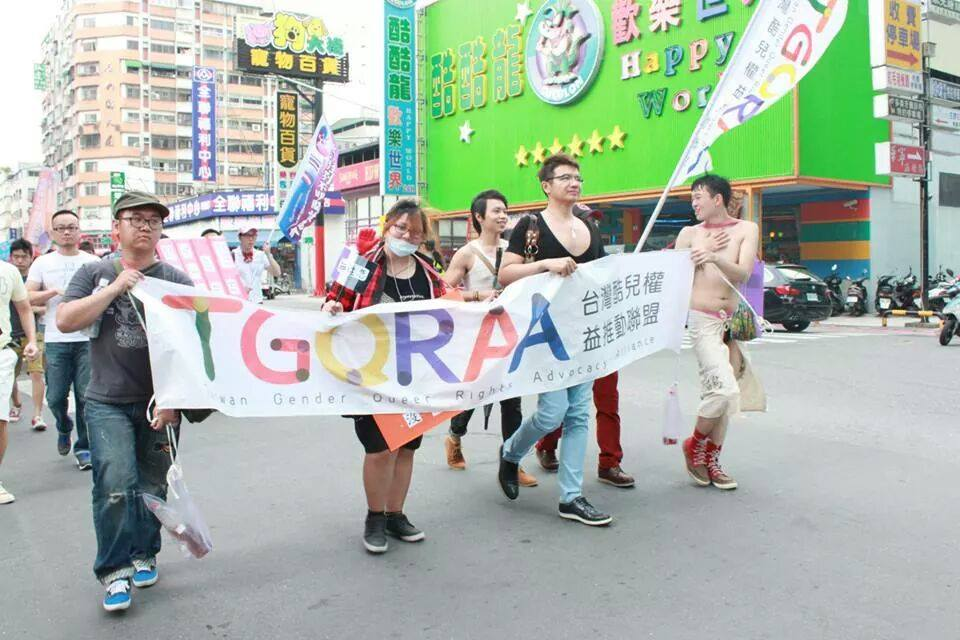
The Taiwan Gender Queer Rights Advocacy Alliance (TGQRAA) held a march in Kaohsiung City in 2015

Beginning in the 1980s, the label queer began to be reclaimed from its pejorative use as a neutral or positive self-identifier by LGBTQ people. In the United States, reclamation of queer occurred in the context of the AIDS crisis and conservative politics of the 1980s, and a perception that the approaches of the lesbian and gay organizations of the time were unable to meet those challenges.

An early example of reclamation was by an LGBTQ organisation called Queer Nation, which was formed in March 1990 and circulated an anonymous flier at the New York Gay Pride Parade in June 1990 titled "Queers Read This". The flier included a passage explaining their adoption of the label queer:

Ah, do we really have to use that word? It's trouble. Every gay person has his or her own take on it. For some it means strange and eccentric and kind of mysterious [...] And for others "queer" conjures up those awful memories of adolescent suffering [...] Well, yes, "gay" is great. It has its place. But when a lot of lesbians and gay men wake up in the morning we feel angry and disgusted, not gay. So we've chosen to call ourselves queer. [...] It's a way of suggesting we close ranks, and forget (temporarily) our individual differences because we face a more insidious common enemy. Yeah, queer can be a rough word but it is also a sly and ironic weapon we can steal from the homophobe's hands and use against him.

By identifying themselves as queer rather than gay, LGBTQ activists sought to reject causes they viewed as assimilationist, such as marriage, military inclusion and adoption. This radical stance, including the rejection of U.S. imperialism, continued the tradition of earlier lesbian and gay anti-war activism, and solidarity with a variety of leftist movements, as seen in the positions taken at the first two National Marches on Washington in 1979 and 1987, the radical direct action of groups like ACT UP, and the historical importance of events like the Stonewall riots. The radical queer groups following in this tradition of LGBTQ activism contrasted firmly with "the holy trinity of marriage, military service and adoption [which had] become the central preoccupation of a gay movement centered more on obtaining straight privilege than challenging power".

=== Reactions ===
Figures such as Andrew Sullivan criticized the queer radical approach, writing in The New Republic in 1993 that their politics did not reflect most gay people, who "...wish to be integrated into society as it is... a 'queer' identity is precisely what they want to avoid". Lisa Duggan criticizes Sullivan's characterization of queer "as a uniform and compulsory identity", countering it was "used most often precisely to question the uniformity of sexual identities". Responding to Sullivan in his 1999 book The Trouble with Normal, Michael Warner criticizes pathologization versus normalcy as a false choice: "One of the reasons why so many people have started using the word 'queer' is that it is a way of saying: 'We're not pathological, but don't think for that reason we want to be normal.'" Sociologist Joshua Gamson argues that the controversy about queer marks a social and political divide in the LGBTQ community between those (including civil-rights activists) who perceive themselves as "normal" and who wish to be seen as ordinary members of society and those who see themselves as separate, confrontational or not part of the ordinary social order.

Reclamation and use of the term queer is controversial; several people and organizations, both LGBTQ and non-LGBTQ, object to some or all uses of the word for various reasons. In addition to those LGBTQ people who dislike the use of queer because of its radical political associations, others disapprove of it because they consider it offensive, in part due to its continued use as a pejorative. Some LGBTQ people avoid queer because they perceive it as faddish slang or as academic jargon.

== Usage and scope ==
Queer as an identity descriptor is used in several overlapping but distinct ways, including as an umbrella term for sexual and gender minorities and as a personal identity label encompassing a range of personal, political, and theoretically informed approaches to sexuality and gender. Depending on context, queer may be meant as an alternative to LGBTQ, as an individual identity within it (the Q in LGBTQ), (Note: The Q can also stand for questioning.) or as a rejection of the validity of such identity categories altogether.

=== Umbrella identity ===
Queer is often "a catch-all umbrella term to include the group of all non-heterosexual and non-cisgender sexual and gender minorities". In this collective sense, it is similar to initialisms such as LGBT, serving as a shorthand descriptor for a broad range of identities.

This usage encompasses, and is used alongside, more specific sexual and gender identities, such as gay, lesbian, bisexual, transgender. Individuals may identify with both a specific identity label and the broader queer umbrella simultaneously.

While LGBTQIA and related initialisms list discrete identity categories, queer operates as an expansive collective term that does not require enumerating subgroups. Sociologists Kristopher Velasco and Pamela Paxton describe this distinction through an analogy comparing "nam[ing] each individual color" to "find[ing] language to articulate the color spectrum itself".

=== Individual identity ===
Queer may also be used as an individual identity by people with a sexual identity or gender identity "that does not correspond to, or that challenges, traditional (esp. heteronormative) ideas of sexuality or gender". As a self-identity label, it can encompass sexuality and gender. Individuals may identify with more than one identity label, or may identify as queer exclusively. It may be used to signify "a statement of resistance against what they see as narrow, limiting, dominantly structured, stagnant, and overly constricted categories".

Recent studies have found that 5–20% of non-heterosexuals identify as queer. Trans and nonbinary people are more likely to identify as queer than cisgender people, with recent studies finding that 21–36% of trans, nonbinary, and gender nonconforming people identify as queer. In a 2025 international survey of more than 40,000 nonbinary people, more than half reported that they use the word queer as a self-identity term in relation to gender.

=== Political identity ===
For many people, queer is an intentionally politicized identity, flowing from the activist, anti-assimilationist context in which it was first reclaimed. As a political identity, queer may be characterized by solidarity across sexual, gender, racial, class, and disabled identity lines. Over time, the flexibility of queer as a label has resulted in it being used in more mainstream contexts, diluting an inherent association with radical politics.

The Trans Language Primer notes:

While it has gained relatively wide usage in the present, there are still many that maintain that in order to be queer, one must be invested in liberation beyond respectability and assimilation. "We're here! We're queer! Get over it!" and "Not gay as in happy, but queer as in fuck you" are popular in the queer community precisely because they capture this spirit of radical liberation.

=== Anti-essentialist identity ===
In queer theory, queer as a personal identity may be "defined by rejection of binary categories of gender and sexuality, and inclusion of any sexual or gender identity that is non-normative, disrupting categories such as man and woman, and gay and straight". Queer theorists such as Judith Butler approach queer not as a fixed identity, but as an anti-essentialist label of affiliation grounded in opposition to normative constructions of gender and sexuality. Robin Brontsema describes queer as "a kind of anti-identity". According to Brontsema, the use of queer as a simple synonym for gay or lesbian "betrays the radical intent of self-identified queers and queer theorists" by equating queer "with the very terms against which it rebels".

=== Intersex and queer identities ===
Scholars and activists have proposed different ways in which queer identities apply or do not apply to intersex people. Sociologist Morgan Holmes and bioethicists Morgan Carpenter and Katrina Karkazis have documented heteronormativity in medical rationales for the surgical normalization of infants and children with atypical sex development, with Holmes and Carpenter further describing intersex bodies as queer bodies. In "What Can Queer Theory Do for Intersex?" Iain Morland contrasts queer "hedonic activism" with an experience of insensate post-surgical intersex bodies to claim that "queerness is characterized by the sensory interrelation of pleasure and shame".

Emi Koyama describes a move away from a queer identity model within the intersex movement:

Such tactic [of reclaiming labels] was obviously influenced by queer identity politics of the 1980s and 90s that were embodied by such groups as Queer Nation and Lesbian Avengers. But unfortunately, intersex activists quickly discovered that the intersex movement could not succeed under this model. For one thing, there were far fewer intersex people compared to the large and visible presence of LGBTQ people in most urban centers. For another, activists soon realized that most intersex individuals were not interested in building intersex communities or culture; what they sought were professional psychological support to live ordinary lives as ordinary men and women and not the adoption of new, misleading identity. ... To make it worse, the word "intersex" began to attract individuals who are not necessarily intersex, but feel that they might be, because they are queer or trans. ... Fortunately, the intersex movement did not rely solely on queer identity model for its strategies.

=== Cisgender heterosexuality and queer identities ===
Queer is sometimes used in a way that includes any non-normative sexuality, including heterosexual cisgender people who actively challenge heterosexist norms. A leaflet circulated in London in 1991 proclaimed, "Queer means to fuck with gender. There are straight queers, bi-queers, tranny queers, lez queers, fag queers, SM queers, fisting queers". Robin Brontsema notes that unlike terms like gay and lesbian, being queer isn't solely defined by who you are attracted to, so "its inherent inclusiveness allows among its ranks not only queer gays, lesbians, bisexuals, and transgendered [people], but also queer straights, sadomasochists, fetishists, etc".

The idea of straight cisgender people identifying as queer is controversial. Many queer people believe that "you don't have to identify as queer if you're on the LGBTQIA+ spectrum, but you do have to be on the LGBTQIA+ spectrum to identify as queer", while others say that being queer is about "my community, my culture, and my way of looking at the world, not just who I love and who I fuck" and welcome straight cisgender people into the queer fold.

The concept of being "culturally queer" has been used to describe straight people who are enmeshed in queer community by virtue of their queer-centric non-normative family structures, relationships, or sexual practices, such as heterosexual children raised by LGBTQ parents (also known as "queerspawn").

As cultural acceptance of LGBTQ people increased in the early decades of the twenty-first century, many LGBTQ people objected to heterosexual cisgender people "playing" with the "fashionable" parts of being LGBTQ, without having to suffer the resulting oppression of being LGBTQ, thus trivializing the struggles experienced by queer people. Celebrities who identify as queer but are perceived as straight have faced backlash.

== Academia ==
In academia, the term queer (and the related verb queering) broadly indicate the study of literature, discourse, academic fields, and other social and cultural areas from a non-heterosexual or non-cisgender viewpoint. Though the fields of queer studies and queer theory are broad, such studies often focus on LGBTQ+ lives, and may involve challenging the assumption that being heterosexual and cisgender are the default or "normal". Queer theory, in particular, may embrace ambiguities and fluidity in traditionally "stable" categories such as gay or straight.

Queer studies is the study of issues relating to sexual orientation and gender identity, usually focusing on LGBTQ people and cultures. Originally centered on LGBTQ history and literary theory, the field has expanded to include the academic study of issues raised in biology, sociology, anthropology, history of science, philosophy, psychology, sexology, political science, ethics, and other fields by an examination of the identity, lives, history, and perception of queer people. Organizations such as the Irish Queer Archive attempt to collect and preserve history related to queer studies.

Queer theory is a field of post-structuralist critical theory that emerged in the early 1990s out of the fields of queer studies and women's studies. Applications of queer theory include queer theology and queer pedagogy. Philosopher Judith Butler has described queer theory as a site of "collective contestation", referring to its commitment to challenging easy categories and definitions. Critics of queer theory argue that this refusal of straightforward categories can make the discipline overly abstract or detached from reality.

Queer theorists such as Rod Ferguson, Jasbir Puar, Lisa Duggan, and Chong-suk Han have critiqued the mainstream gay political movement as allied with neoliberal and imperialistic agendas, including gay tourism, gay and trans military inclusion, and state- and church-sanctioned marriages for monogamous gay couples. Puar, a queer theorist of color, specifically coined the term homonationalism to refer to the perceived rise of American exceptionalism, nationalism, white supremacy, and patriarchy within the gay community, catalyzed in response to the September 11 attacks.

In their research on the queer movements of Indonesia and Malaysia, scholars Jón Ingvar Kjaran and Mohammad Naeimi have said that the "localization of modern queer identity", rooted in local interpretations of queer theory and "Muslim modernism", has helped queer Indonesians and Malaysians to "promote their self-construction and organize a collective mobilization for their rights". They contrast this with the rhetoric of those conservative Muslim homophobes who portray "gay" or "LGBTQ" identities as a form of Western imperialism, as well as the "Eurocentric discourse", homonationalism and homonormativity of "LGBTQ politics" in the global north.

== Culture and politics ==
Several LGBTQ social movements around the world use the identifier queer, such as the Queer Cyprus Association in Cyprus and the Queer Youth Network in the UK. In India, pride parades include Queer Azaadi Mumbai and the Delhi Queer Pride Parade. The use of queer and Q is also widespread in Australia, including national counselling and support service Qlife and QNews.

Other social movements exist as offshoots of queer culture or combinations of queer identity with other views. Adherents of queer nationalism support the notion that the LGBTQ community forms a distinct people due to their unique culture and customs. Queercore (originally homocore) is a cultural and social movement that began in the mid-1980s as an offshoot of punk expressed in a do-it-yourself style through zines, music, writing, art and film.

The term queer migration is used to describe the movement of LGBTQ people around the world often to escape discrimination or ill treatment due to their orientation or gender expression. Organizations such as the Iranian Railroad for Queer Refugees and Rainbow Railroad attempt to assist individuals in such relocations.

=== Queer flag ===
Queer flag

A pride flag for the queer community was created in 2015, though it is not widely known. Its colors include blue and pink for attraction to the same gender, orange and green for non-binary people, and black and white for agender, asexual, and aromantic people.

== Art ==
The label queer is often applied to art movements, particularly cinema. New queer cinema was a movement in queer-themed independent filmmaking in the early 1990s. Modern queer film festivals include the Melbourne Queer Film Festival and Mardi Gras Film Festival (run by Queer Screen) in Australia, the Mumbai Queer Film Festival in India, the Asian Queer Film Festival in Japan, and Queersicht in Switzerland. Chinese film director Cui Zi'en titled his 2008 documentary about homosexuality in China Queer China, which premiered at the 2009 Beijing Queer Film Festival after previous attempts to hold a queer film festival were shut down by the government.

Multidisciplinary queer arts festivals include the Outburst Queer Arts Festival in Northern Ireland, the Queer Arts Festival in Canada, and the National Queer Arts Festival in the US.

Television shows that use queer in their titles include the UK series Queer as Folk and its American-Canadian remake of the same name, Queer Eye, and the cartoon Queer Duck.

== See also ==
- Gay Shame – Radical queer collective and movement
- Heterosexism – System of bias and prejudice in favor of heterosexuality
- Homophobia – Negative attitudes towards homosexual people
- Queers (TV series)
- Sexual and gender minorities – Individuals with a minority sexual orientation or gender identity
- Sexuality and gender identity–based cultures
- Queer ecology
- Queerplatonic relationship – Non-romantic intimate partnerships
