= X v United Kingdom =

1978 European Court of Human Rights case

X. v. the United Kingdom was a 1978 case before the European Court of Human Rights, challenging the Sexual Offences Acts 1956 and 1967 in the United Kingdom. The case addressed privacy protections and age of consent laws for homosexuals (application no. 7215/75).

== Facts ==
In 1974, a 26-year-old male, anonymously identified as 'X' but subsequently identified as Peter Vernon Wells (1947–79), was arrested in the United Kingdom and charged under the Sexual Offences Act 1956 with two counts of buggery committed with two 18-year-old men. X was sentenced two and a half years of imprisonment on the first count and six months on the second count. There was evidence shown that X had 'virtually made a prisoner' of one of the men he had relationship with; however this was contradicted not only by X but also the man he had a relationship with.

The applicant in the case, X, contended that his arrest and imprisonment was a violation of Article 8 of the European Convention on Human Rights, which guarantees the right to respect for private life, and that homosexual relations between consenting adults should not be criminal offences.

X also appealed that The Sexual Offences Act 1956, which provided that sexual relations with a male under the age of 21 constituted an offence, was also in violation of Article 14, which prohibits discrimination. X's claim was based on the fact that the act treated homosexual relations differently from heterosexual relationships, and that it treated male homosexual acts differently from female ones.

== Judgment ==
The Court ruled unanimously that prosecution and imprisonment of X was not an interference with his right to privacy, because there was an element of force involved in one of the relationships. Therefore, no violation of Article 8 of the ECHR had taken place.

On the issue of the act's age of consent being fixed at 21, the Court ruled eight votes to four that the age of consent laws were not in violation of the human rights convention, because protection of the rights of others was a legitimate aim, and therefore justified. No violation of either Article 8 or Article 14 had taken place.

On the issue of discrimination of homosexuals but not heterosexuals in the act's age of consent provisions, the Court ruled nine votes to two with one abstention that social protection was an "objective and reasonable justification" for the criminal sanctions, and that no violation of either Article 8 or Article 14 had taken place.

On the issue of the act's difference in its treatment of male and female homosexual acts, the Court ruled eleven votes with one abstention that, citing German studies which describe "a specific social danger in the case of masculine homosexuality", and that male homosexuals as having "a clear tendency to proselytise adolescents", the act's aims were justified, and no violation of either Article 8 or Article 14 had taken place.

== Aftermath ==
The findings of the Court concerning the compatibility of an unequal age of consent were overturned in 2003 by S.L. v. Austria.

== See also ==
- Gay rights in the United Kingdom
- List of LGBT-related ECHR cases
- The Age of Consent (album)
