= McCann v UK =

European court case

McCann v UK [2008] 47 EHRR 40 is a European Court of Human Rights case. It established that a joint tenant's right to respect for the home under Article 8 of the European Convention on Human Rights had been breached in a case where the other joint tenant had been coerced into serving a notice to quit to end the joint tenancy.
