= Lustig-Prean and Beckett v United Kingdom =

- Court: European Court of Human Rights
- Decided: 27 September 1999
- Citations: [1999] ECHR 71; (1999) 29 EHRR 548

Lustig-Prean and Beckett v United Kingdom (2000) 29 ECHR 548 is a UK labour law and European Convention on Human Rights case on sexual orientation discrimination. The European Court of Human Rights combined judgments for Beckett and Lustig-Prean, and the parallel decisions for Smith and Grady, are regarded as pivotal in gay rights throughout the UK and Europe.

== Facts ==
Duncan Lustig-Prean (born 13 March 1959) is a retired officer of the Royal Navy. In 1994 he was dismissed from the Royal Navy when it became known that he was gay. He then joined Rank Outsiders, who were campaigning for the right of gay men and lesbians to serve in the armed forces.

John Beckett, a former Royal Navy Weapons Engineer was dismissed in 1993 for being gay following personal disclosure to a military chaplain.

Lustig-Prean and Beckett alleged that their dismissal, together with the intrusive nature of the investigations conducted by the Military Police into their sexuality, violated their right to privacy under Article 8 ECHR. Duncan Lustig-Prean and John Beckett alongside Jeanette Smith and Graeme Grady brought a case against the UK – Lustig-Prean and Beckett v the United Kingdom – in the European Court of Human Rights. In 1999 the Court found in their favour, as a result of which the Government suspended dismissals on the grounds of homosexuality, and subsequently changed the law.

== Judgment ==
The European Court of Human Rights held that the Article 8 rights of Lustig-Prean and Beckett had been breached. The UK government immediately suspended discharging homosexuals and within months had changed the law. An ECHR judgement applies to all signatory nations of the convention.

== See also ==
- UK employment discrimination law
- UK labour law
- Human Rights Act 1998
- The parallel ECHR decision in Smith and Grady v. United Kingdom (1999)
