= Queer street =

Metaphor for difficult situations

Queer street is a colloquial term referring to a person being in some difficulty, most commonly financial. It is often associated with Carey Street, where London's bankruptcy courts were once located.

== Origins ==
The term appears in 1811 in the Lexicon Balatronicum: A Dictionary of Buckish Slang, University Wit, and Pickpocket Eloquence, an updated version of Francis Grose's Dictionary of the Vulgar Tongue. It is defined therein as:

"QUEER STREET. Wrong. Improper. Contrary to one's wish. It is queer street, a cant phrase, to signify that it is wrong or different to our wish."

Although often being associated with the Carey Street bankruptcy courts, which also lends its name to a similar phrase, the term Queer Street appears to predate the courts' move to Carey Street from Westminster in the 1840s.

The folk etymology associating Queer Street and Carey Street has persisted and led to a number of explanations for its supposed origins: that 'queer' may be a corruption of 'Carey' or that it is a transmutation of the German language term Querstrasse (street running off at a right angle), the latter origin being akin to that of the idiom "orthogonal to" in the sense of "conceptually or logically incompatible with."

== Literary uses ==
Charles Dickens wrote a chapter in Our Mutual Friend (1864) called "Lodgers in Queer Street" about a corrupt moneylender plotting to bankrupt his "friends" because they outshine him socially.

In Strange Case of Dr Jekyll and Mr Hyde (1886) by Robert Louis Stevenson, chapter 1, Mr Enfield says: "No, sir. I make it a rule of mine: the more it looks like Queer Street, the less I ask."

In The Great God Pan (1894) by Arthur Machen; Villiers speaking to Austin about his attempt to uncover the original identity of a "Mrs. Beaumont" stated: "If you see mud at the top of a stream, you may be sure that it was once at the bottom. I went to the bottom. I have always been fond of diving into Queer Street for my amusement, and I found my knowledge of that locality and its inhabitants very useful."

In the Sherlock Holmes story "The Second Stain" (1904) by Arthur Conan Doyle, Inspector Lestrade chastises a constable, "It's lucky for you, my man, that nothing is missing, or you would find yourself in Queer Street." In the Sherlock Holmes story "The Adventure of Shoscombe Old Place" and corresponding Granada television series episode, The Casebook of Sherlock Holmes, episode 3, "Shoscombe Old Place", Watson observes that a character in debt is "by all accounts, so far down Queer Street, he may never find his way back again."

In Robert Falcon Scott's (1912) diary account of the return of the South Pole party, he notes - "We have only three days food with us and shall be in Queer Street if we miss the depot."

In Women in Love (1921) by D. H. Lawrence, Gerald Crich's mother says to him "You mind yourself, or you'll find yourself in Queer Street, that's what will happen to you."

In Whose Body? (1923) by Dorothy L. Sayers, Lord Peter Wimsey says to Inspector Charles Parker "Don't march in there blowing about murders and police warrants, or you may find yourself in Queer Street."

In Death in the Clouds (1935) by Agatha Christie, a businessman named James Ryder, one of the suspects in the murder of Madame Giselle, remarks that, "It's odd how small a sum will sometimes put a man in Queer Street." Christie had previously used the term in her novel Peril at End House (1932) and in Murder in Three Acts (1934), her preferred title for Three-Act Tragedy, the title used for the novel's original U.S. publication.

In ''Brideshead Revisited (1945) Edward Ryder, commenting on his son Charles' difficult financial situation, remarks dryly, "Hard up? Penurious? Distressed? Embarrassed? Stoney broke? On the rocks? In Queer Street?" - Your cousin Melchior was imprudent with his investments and got into a very queer street - worked his passage to Australia before the mast."

In the 1990 television show Twin Peaks sheriff Truman chastises the pathologist Albert saying "normally if a stranger walked into my station talking this kind of crap, he'd be looking for his teeth two blocks up on Queer Street."

In the British cooking show Two Fat Ladies, during the episode "Barristers at Lincoln's Inn" (1998) in season three, Clarissa Dickson Wright tells her sidekick, and driver, Jennifer Paterson during a motorcycle with sidecar jaunt through London, "Turn into Queer Street Jennifer." To which Jennifer replies, "They probably call it Gay Street now." Clarissa corrects her, "No, not that sort of queer. It's because the bankruptcy courts are here."

== Combat sports ==
Queer Street may also refer to the moment when a boxer or similar combatant is dazed from getting struck on the head but remains standing.
