= NH v Associazione Avvocatura per i diritti LGBTI – Rete Lenford =

Court case

NH v Associazione Avvocatura per i diritti LGBTI
- European Court of Justice

Decided 23 April 2020
- Full case name: Case C-507/18 NH v Associazione Avvocatura per i diritti LGBTI – Rete Lenford
- ECLI: ECLI:EU:C:2020:289
- Chamber: Grand Chamber

Court composition
- Judge-Rapporteur; Irmantas Jarukaitis
- President; Koen Lenaerts
- Advocate General; Eleanor Sharpston

NH v Associazione Avvocatura per i diritti LGBTI – Rete Lenford case is a 2020 case of the Court of Justice of the European Union that provides insights into the application of Directive 2000/78 (Employment Equality Directive) in addressing homophobic speech in employment. While affirming established principles, the Court’s ruling also highlights the complexities of balancing freedom of expression with the protection of LGBT individuals from discrimination.

== Case background ==
NH, a senior lawyer at an Italian law firm, sparked controversy during a radio interview in Italy when he declared his refusal to hire gay individuals or utilize their services. Although there was no ongoing recruitment at the time, NH's remarks prompted legal action from the Associazione Avvocatura per i diritti LGBTI – Rete Lenford (the Associazione), an Italian association defending LGBTI rights, alleging discrimination under Italian legislation implementing Directive 2000/78.

The Tribunale di Bergamo found NH guilty of discrimination and ordered him to publish an apology, devise an anti-discrimination action plan, and pay damages to the Associazione. NH appealed to higher courts, ultimately leading to the Corte suprema di cassazione staying proceedings and referring two questions to the CJEU.

The questions focused on the interpretation of Directive 2000/78 and concerned the material scope of this instrument, as well as the eligibility of a lawyers’ association to initiate legal action in similar circumstances. The first question asked whether Article 9(2) of the Directive implied that in the absence of an identifiable victim, an association like the Associazione could be recognized as a representative entity, thereby automatically possessing the right to bring legal proceedings to uphold the directive's prohibition. The second question addressed whether homophobic statements, like those under scrutiny in the case, fell within the Directive's scope, notwithstanding their lack of connection to ongoing or planned recruitment processes by the individual making the statements.

== Opinion of Attorney General ==
“Έπεα πτερόεντα, words have wings. The meaning of that expression, the origins of which can be traced back to Homer is twofold: that words fly away, carried by the wind; but also that words travel fast and spread quickly. The present case, concerning statements made during a radio interview, comes closer to the second meaning. Today, words spoken on the radio or television or transmitted via social media are disseminated rapidly and have consequences. The oral statements at the origin of the main proceedings have traveled as far as Luxembourg and give this Court the opportunity to interpret the provisions of Council Directive 2000/78/EC of 27 November 2000 establishing a general framework for equal treatment in employment and occupation.”

Advocate General (AG) Sharpston, reversed the order of questions proposed by the Italian court, first determining if the situation fell under the Employment Equality Directive (2000/78/EC), then assessing the Associazione's standing to enforce its provisions. Regarding the second question, the AG found direct discrimination under the cited Directive, emphasizing the importance of “access to employment” within its material scope. She argued that discriminatory statements impacting employment, even without an ongoing recruitment process, constitute a violation. Drawing from prior cases, she established criteria for assessing the nexus between such statements and employment access.

The AG also addressed concerns about freedom of expression, asserting that discriminatory statements cannot be justified by it, as the Directive 2000/78/EC prohibits such policies. Regarding the first question, she affirmed that non-governmental organizations can bring actions to enforce Employment Equality Directive obligations, provided they have a legitimate interest. This interest, defined by national law, aligns with the objectives of combating discrimination and ensuring compliance with EU law.

Finally, the AG asserted that the Directive allows associations to seek sanctions for discriminatory conduct, even without an identifiable victim, through national legislation. Such sanctions should be effective, proportionate, and dissuasive, potentially including damages.

== Judgment of the Grand Chamber of the CJEU ==
The Judgement of CJEU closely aligns with the AG’s Opinion. The Court clarified that the Directive must be interpreted uniformly across the EU, independent of Member States’ laws. Considering it as an expression of the general prohibition of discrimination in the EU Charter of Fundamental Rights, the Court emphasized that its application should not be interpreted restrictively. Referring to its ruling in Asociaţia Accept, the Court highlighted that even if discriminatory statements are made outside a recruitment context, they could still fall under the Directive if a clear link exists between the statements and access to employment. The court outlined three criteria for determining this link: the authority of the speaker over recruitment, the discriminatory intent, and the context of the statements.

The Court then addressed the tension between the Directive’s prohibition of discrimination based on sexual orientation and the freedom of expression protected by the EU Charter. It concluded, echoing the AG, that limitations on freedom of expression are justified as they are lawfully provided by the Directive and serve the Directive’s objectives without excessively infringing on freedom of expression.

Concerning the first question, the Court considered whether the Associazione should automatically have standing to enforce the Directive. It noted that Member States have the discretion to enact provisions more favorable to equal treatment than those in the Directive. Building on its prior ruling in Asociația Accept, the Court affirmed that the Directive does not prevent Member States from granting associations with a legitimate interest the right to initiate legal actions to enforce Directive obligations, even without a specific complainant. It emphasized that it is up to each Member State to determine the conditions under which such associations can bring legal proceedings for discrimination under the Directive.

== See also ==
- LGBT rights in the European Union
- Equality Directive 2000
- Asociaţia Accept v Consiliul Naţional pentru Combaterea Discriminării
