= Gillan and Quinton v United Kingdom =

Gillan and Quinton v United Kingdom was a decision by the European Court of Human Rights that ruled that the United Kingdom's stop and search powers without reasonable suspicion under the Terrorism Act 2000 were a violation of the right to privacy. The Court held that "the powers of authorisation and confirmation as well as those of stop and search under sections 44 and 45 of the 2000 Act are neither sufficiently circumscribed nor subject to adequate legal safeguards against abuse. They are not, therefore, 'in accordance with the law' and it follows that there has been a violation of Article 8 of the Convention."
