= Sverre Erik Jebens =

Norwegian lawyer and judge (born 1949)

Judge of the European Court of Human Rights in respect of Norway
- In office 1 November 2004 – 31 August 2011
- Preceded by: Hanne Sophie Greve
- Succeeded by: Erik Møse

Personal details
- Born: 29 September 1949 (age 77) Bergen
- Education: University of Oslo
- Profession: Lawyer

Sverre Erik Jebens (born 29 September 1949) is a Norwegian lawyer and the former judge of the European Court of Human Rights in respect of Norway, a position he held from November 2004 to 2011. He is currently a judge in the Norwegian Court of Appeal, Frostating lagmannsrett.

== Career ==
Jebens was born on 29 September 1949 in Bergen, the second largest city in Norway, and studied law at the University of Oslo in the country's capital, graduating in 1977. He was then appointed Deputy Judge at the Inderøy District Court, and in 1980 took up a post with Trondheim police as head of its Financial Crimes Section.

From 1983 to 1985, he was Legal Advisor within the Norwegian Ministry of Justice, and from 1987 to 1988 was Chief Legal Counsel at Trondheim County Borough Council, after which he was appointed judge at Frostating Court of Appeal in Trondheim. In November 2004, he took up office as Judge of the European Court of Human Rights in respect of Norway. He served as at the European Court of Human Rights until August 2011. He is resident in Trondheim, where the Frostating Court of Appeal is located.

== Publications ==
- Sverre Erik Jebens: Menneskerettigheter i straffeprosessen ("Human rights in criminal procedure"), Oslo 2004. ISBN 82-02-23997-4

== See also ==
- European Court of Human Rights
- List of judges of the European Court of Human Rights
