= Section 171 of the Criminal Code of Cyprus =

Section 171 of the Criminal Code of Cyprus was a section of the Cyprus Criminal Code, which was enacted in 1929, that criminalized homosexual acts between consenting male adults. Until 1998, the section read:

"Any person who (a) has carnal knowledge of any person against the order of nature, or (b) permits a male person to have carnal knowledge of him against the order of nature is guilty of a felony and is liable to imprisonment for five years".

== Court challenge ==
Section 171 did not apply to women and did not criminalize lesbian sex. Although rarely enforced, it was challenged in the European Court of Human Rights by a Cypriot man named Alecos Modinos. The Court handed down its judgment in Modinos v. Cyprus on April 22, 1993, and overwhelmingly ruled by eight votes to one that Section 171 violated Article 8 of the European Convention on Human Rights, which protected people's right to privacy. The judgment followed the opinion reached by the Court in two other similar cases: Dudgeon v. the United Kingdom (1981) and Norris v. Ireland (1988). Ironically, Section 171 had been cited by Turkish Cypriot Judge Mehmet Zeka in his dissenting opinion in the Dudgeon case to oppose the Court's invalidation of Northern Ireland's anti-buggery laws. Judge Zeka had argued that, as a Cypriot, he was in a "better position in forecasting the public outcry and the turmoil which would ensue if such laws are repealed or amended in favour of homosexuals either in Cyprus or in Northern Ireland. Both countries are religious-minded and adhere to moral standards which are centuries' old".

== Opposition to repeal ==
Nonetheless, it was only five years after Modinos v. Cyprus was decided that the anti-sodomy provisions of Section 171 were effectively repealed. The slowness of the reform was due to the deep divisions created by such a morally charged issue. The repeal of Section 171 was openly supported by the liberal United Democrats, and openly opposed by the center-right Democratic Party. Former President George Vassiliou came out in support of the repeal, as did Foreign Minister Ioannis Kasoulides, who argued that Cyprus "cannot ask Turkey to comply with the decisions of the Council [of Europe] regarding human rights violations [while] at the same time [refusing] to conform to such decisions."

As Judge Zeka had predicted 17 years earlier, the proposed repeal of Section 171 sparked a huge public backlash. Nearly a thousand people protested outside the House of Representatives in Nicosia on May 15, 1997. Known as the Committee for the Fight Against the Decriminalization of Homosexuality, the protest was led by Cypriot Orthodox Church priests, monks and nuns, and featured signs reading "No to Sodom and Gomorrah in Cyprus" and "Cyprus is the island of saints, not homosexuals." Archbishop Chrysostomos I actively campaigned against the repeal of Section 171, and the Pancyprian Christian Orthodox Movement collected 40,000 signatures (representing nearly 5% of the island's total population) on a petition opposing the reform, and even went as far as promising to compile a "blacklist" of all MPs voting for the repeal.

== Repeal ==
The Council of Europe made repeated warnings to Cyprus that it could face expulsion or other political sanctions if it delayed any further in complying with the Court's decision in Modinos v. Cyprus. As a result, the bill decriminalizing private homosexual acts between consenting adults was passed by the House of Representatives on May 21, 1998, just eight days prior to the May 29 deadline set by the Council. It was passed with 11 of the House's 56 members intentionally absent. 36 MPs voted for the bill, eight voted against it, and one MP chose to abstain.

== See also ==
- Article 200, a similar provision in the Romanian Penal Code
- Paragraph 175, a similar provision in the German Criminal Code
- LGBT rights in Cyprus
