= Queer Cyprus Association =

Initiative Against Homophobia recently changed to Queer Cyprus Association www.queercy.org

Queer Cyprus Association is an LGBTQ rights organisation in Northern Cyprus aimed to deal with criminal law amendments of TRNC which criminalises same-sex relationships. They seek equal human rights including to "fully decriminalize homosexuality, equalize the age of consent and better protect LGBTQ people under the law.”

The association was established with the name Initiative Against Homophobia in 2007. In March 2012, Initiative Against Homophobia has gone through a constitutional amendment and continues its work under its new name Queer Cyprus Association (Turkish: Kuir Kıbrıs Derneği).

== Background ==
HOKI was established in Northern Cyprus to deal with the rights of LGBT people. In April 2008, the initiative presented a proposal regarding the repeal of criminal law to the president of Parliament Fatma Ekenoglu. The Criminal laws in Cyprus north still have articles from British Colonial period where homosexual activities are defined as Crimes Against Nature and are penalised. Cyprus north is the last territory in European Council where homosexuality is a crime.

British Colonial Laws, Articles 171, 172 and 173 of Chapter 154 of the penal code, "punishes 'unnatural sex' with five years jail and gives three years imprisonment for attempts to commit such acts." As of 2011 Cyprus is seen as the least gay-friendly EU country followed by Italy, Latvia and Malta.

== History ==
In 2008, and in association with the International Day Against Homophobia and Transphobia (IDAHO), HOKI applied to the local authorities in Nicosia to become a fully established and recognised association.

In 2008 HOKI presented a request to repeal 171, 172, and 173 of Punishment Regulations-Chapter 154 along with a resolution to Fatma Ekenoglu, the head of the Parliamentary of Turkish Republic of Northern Cyprus. They stated the rules "provide the main framework for regulating discrimination against sexual orientation, and they have not been revised since British colonial time."

In 2010 HOKI organized an international conference, "Solidarity and Networking Conference Cyprus 2010," in co-operation with the International Lesbian and Gay Association (ILGA) - Europe and hosted by the Journalists Union. The event emphasized that homosexuality is recognized as a crime only in Cyprus and assessed this fact as a "violation of human rights."

In July 2011 "two men were arrested and charged with 'unnatural intercourse.'" According to Article 171 of Chapter 154 of the Criminal Code applicable in Cyprus north “whoever has sexual intercourse against the order of nature with any person, or, allows sexual intercourse against the order of nature with a male, commits a serious crime and is punishable with up to five years in prison.” The men were arrested after neighbor's complaints, and accusations have been made that one of them was "bringing men home". "The judge said they should be held in custody for a day." HOKI publicised the case and others followed suit including LGBTQI organisations from Greece, Malta, Turkey, Albania and Cyprus, who supported HOKI and reiterated calls for a change in the law.

In a similar incident in October 2011, five men, one of whom was Michalis Sarris, former Cypriot Minister of Finance, were arrested over a few days and detained on charges of “unnatural intercourse.” During remand hearings all the detainees apart from Michalis Sarris reported being beaten by the police. HOKI raised alarm at the arrests which led to protests from Members of the European Parliament, and international human rights organisations. HOKI also alleged the Cyprus north media, in their reporting, normalized attitudes of hatred and fed "homophobic reports and comments to the public." The story was covered by Cypriot and international media, raising the issue of the continued existence and use of the law. The men were released on bail. HOKI led a group of NGOs to declare "The current law in effect does not protect the rights of the children nor the rights of people’s control over their own bodies. It aims to protect the ‘morality’ of the society."

Also in 2011 HOKI hosted ILGA-Europe’s family exhibition Different Families, Same Love in Nicosia (north). The opening included a range of media including state television with the exhibition receiving positive press coverage and provided a different and positive facets of the LGBT community to the general public.

In March 2012, Initiative Against Homophobia has gone through a constitutional amendment and continues its work under its new name Queer Cyprus Association. QCA aims to promote equal rights for LGBTQ people in Cyprus and to eliminate discriminations based on gender, gender expression, sexual orientation and gender identity. They have been a member of the International Lesbian, Gay, Bisexual, Trans and Intersex Association (ILGA) since 2011.

In August the European Court of Human Rights (ECHR) has agreed to examine a legal challenge against Turkey for the north’s continued failure to repeal a law banning homosexuality, Queer Cyprus Association said Turkey must now defend the legacy of British colonialism at the ECHR.

== See also ==
- List of LGBT organizations
