= Modinos v. Cyprus =

Modinos v. Cyprus 16 EHRR 485 (25 March 1993) is a judgment of the European Court of Human Rights concerning Article 8 of the European Convention on Human Rights.

== Case ==
The case was initiated by Alexandros Modinos, a gay rights activist who had founded Apeleftherotiko Kinima Omofilofilon Kiprou (AKOK), or "Cypriot Homosexual Liberation Movement", in 1987. At the time, Modinos was involved in a sexual relationship with another male adult, and claimed to suffer great strain, apprehension, and fear of prosecution by reason of Section 171 of the Criminal Code of Cyprus, which criminalized certain homosexual acts.

== Judgment ==
The court ruled by 8 votes to one that the existence of a prohibition continuously and directly affected the applicant's private life, thus there was an interference with his right to respect for private life. As the Government limited their submissions to maintaining that there was no interference, and did not seek to argue that there existed a justification under Article 8(2) for the impugned legal provisions, the Court did not find that—in the light of the above-mentioned fact and having regard to its judgment in Dudgeon v. United Kingdom and Norris v. Ireland—a re-examination of the question was called for.
