= Smith and Grady v. United Kingdom =

Smith and Grady v UK
- Court: European Court of Human Rights
- Decided: 27 September 1999
- Citations: (1999) 29 EHRR 493; [1999] ECHR 72; [1999] IRLR 734; (1999) 11 Admin LR 879

Case history
- Prior actions: R v Ministry of Defence, ex p Smith [1996] QB 517

Keywords
- Right to A Private Life, Homosexuality in the Military

Smith and Grady v UK (1999) 29 EHRR 493 is a landmark decision of the European Court of Human Rights that unanimously found that the investigation into and subsequent discharge of personnel from HM Forces on the basis they were homosexual was a breach of their right to a private life under Article 8 of the European Convention on Human Rights. The decision, which caused widespread controversy at the time led the UK to adopt a revised sexual-orientation-free Armed Forces Code of Social Conduct in January 2000. In UK law the decision is notable because the applicants' case had previously been dismissed in both the High Court and Court of Appeal, who had found that the authorities' actions had not violated the principles of legality including Wednesbury unreasonableness, thus highlighting the difference in approach of the European Court of Human Rights and the domestic courts.

== Facts ==
Smith had been a member of the Royal Air Force since 1989. In June 1994 a woman telephoned the air force alleging that Smith was a lesbian and had been sexually harassing the caller. Smith was questioned by the service police and admitted that she was gay and that she had a same-sex relationship while in the RAF. The service police asked her intimate questions on the details of her sexual life, asking for the names of previous partners, her HIV status and other details. A few months later Smith was given an administrative discharge from the Royal Air Force. Grady had been a member of the Armed forces since 1980 but was discharged following disclosures of a nanny working for the British Defence Liaison Service. The applicants sought to challenge their discharges first through a domestic judicial review, and when this was unsuccessful they launched an application to the European Court of Human Rights.

== Judgment ==
The British government conceded that there had been an interference with the applicants' right to a private life under article 8 of the European Convention. The issue for the court was therefore whether such an interference could be justified. In order for an interference under article 8 to be justified it is necessary that it is in accordance with the law, in the pursuit of a legitimate aim, and must be considered necessary in a democratic society. The government policy had been given both statutory recognition and recognition by the lower courts and the court considered that the policy could be said to be in the pursuit of the legitimate aim interests of national security" and "the prevention of disorder". However, the court was not satisfied that the policy could be considered "necessary in a democratic society". The court was not satisfied that the government had provided credible justification for its treatment of homosexual personnel. Observing that:

”these attitudes, even if sincerely felt by those who expressed them, ranged from stereotypical expressions of hostility to those of homosexual orientation, to vague expressions of unease about the presence of homosexual colleagues. To the extent that they represent a predisposed bias on the part of a heterosexual majority against a homosexual minority, these negative attitudes cannot, of themselves, be considered by the Court to amount to sufficient justification for the interferences with the applicants' rights outlined above any more than similar negative attitudes towards those of a different race, origin or colour".

The court considered that the government had not offered convincing and weighty reasons for the investigation of the applicants sexual orientation or their subsequent discharge and therefore considered that there had been a breach of their right to a private life under Article 8 of the European Convention.

Mowbray has suggested that the court may have been influenced in its decision by the doubts expressed by some of the Obiter dicta of the domestic proceedings which expressed doubts about the durability of the armed forces policy towards homosexuals.

== Significance ==
The decision was initially controversial, with gay rights advocates arguing that it represented a breakthrough but some politicians and commentators expressing concerns that the decision would disrupt Armed Forces morale. Today, such fears are widely regarded as having been proven unfounded. The Ministry of Defence has concluded that the policy had "been hailed as a solid achievement" and that "there has been no perceived effect on morale, unit cohesion or operational effectiveness".

The decision has come to be widely accepted both within the military and outside it with Wing Commander Phil Sagar of the armed forces' joint equality and diversity training centre issuing a formal apology on behalf of the Ministry of Defence in 2007 to those affected by the MOD's former policy. The current attitude of the Armed Forces was demonstrated in October 2008 when the outgoing head of the British Army, General Sir Richard Dannatt told delegates at a lesbian, gay, bisexual and transgender conference that "respect for others is not an optional extra" and in July 2009 diversity within the armed services was actively celebrated with the first openly gay serviceman featured on the front cover of the armed forces' Soldier magazine. In 2015 following the fifteenth anniversary of the lifting of the gay ban the Ministry of Defence announced changes to its equal opportunities policy which allowed new recruits to disclose their sexuality.

== See also ==
- The parallel ECHR decision in Lustig-Prean and Beckett v United Kingdom (1999)
