= S. L. v. Austria =

2003 European Court of Human Rights case

S.L. v. Austria was a case in the European Court of Human Rights concerning the age of consent. Austrian law, under Article 209 of the Austrian Criminal Code, provided for higher age of consent for male homosexual relations than for other (heterosexual or female homosexual) relations. The judgment of the court was delivered on 9 January 2003.

== Background ==
Article 209 of the Austrian Criminal Code set the age of consent for male homosexual sex at 18 years, 4 years higher than the age of consent for heterosexual and lesbian sex, which was instead set at 14.

In 1996, the Austrian Parliament had rejected an attempt to repeal the Article by a tied vote of 91 to 91.

The complaint was brought to the Court by a man who chose to remain anonymous, who was referred to in the Court's proceedings as "S.L.". S.L. was born in 1981 and reported himself to have been sure of his homosexuality at the age of 15. He lived in a rural area where homosexuality is still taboo, and suffered from the fact that he could not live his homosexuality openly and – until he reached the age of 18 – could not enter into any fulfilling sexual relationship with an adult partner without having a fear of exposing that person to criminal prosecution.

A male person who after attaining the age of nineteen fornicates with a person of the same sex who has attained the age of fourteen years but not the age of eighteen years shall be sentenced to imprisonment for six months to five years.

— Article 209 of the Austrian Criminal Code (in the version in force at the material time).

On 2 June 2002, Article 209 was declared unconstitutional by the Austrian Constitutional Court; on 10 July 2002, it was repealed by Parliament, which introduced a new provision (Article 207b) penalizing sexual acts with a person under sixteen years of age if that person was for certain reasons not mature enough to understand the meaning of the act and the offender took advantage of this immaturity or if the person under sixteen years of age was in a predicament and the offender took advantage of that situation. Article 207b applied equally to all adults, regardless of sex or sexual orientation.

== Judgement ==
The Court ruled unanimously that the inequality of age of consent constituted a violation of Article 14 taken in conjunction with Article 8, and also unanimously ruled that there was no need to examine the complaints lodged under Article 8 alone.

It was not disputed before the Court that the case falls within the ambit of Article 8. The development following the judgment of the Constitutional Court did not affect the applicant’s status as a victim. As regards the violation of Article 14 in conjunction with Article 8, the Court found no decisive difference between the present case and Sutherland v. United Kingdom.

The Court examined whether there was an objective and reasonable justification why young men in the fourteen-to-eighteen-age bracket needed protection against any sexual relationship with adult men, while young women in the same age bracket did not need such protection against relations with either adult men or women. It came to the conclusion that to the extent that Article 209 of the Criminal Code embodied predisposed bias on the part of a heterosexual majority against the homosexual minority, these negative attitudes could not themselves provide sufficient justification for the differential treatment anymore.
