= Same-sex marriage in Austria =

Same-sex marriage has been legal in Austria since 1 January 2019. On 4 December 2017, the Constitutional Court ruled that the non-discrimination and equality provisions of the Constitution of Austria guarantee same-sex couples the right to marry. The decision took effect on 1 January 2019, making Austria the fifteenth country in Europe and the 24th in the world to allow same-sex couples to marry nationwide. Polling indicates that a majority of Austrians support the legal recognition of same-sex marriage.

Austria has also recognised same-sex registered partnerships since 1 January 2010, providing several, but not all, of the rights, benefits, obligations and responsibilities of marriage.

== Unregistered cohabitation ==
On 24 July 2003, the European Court of Human Rights published its decision in Karner v. Austria, which was submitted on 24 July 1997. The applicant, who died in 2000 while the case was pending, was taken to court in 1995 by his landlord who wanted to terminate the tenancy after Karner's same-sex partner died. Austrian law provided that family members had a right to succeed to a tenancy. While the case was initially dismissed by lower courts, the Constitutional Court of Austria ruled in favour of the landlord, saying the notion of "life companion" (Lebensgefährte) was only applicable to persons of the opposite sex. The European Court of Human Rights considered this ruling to be in violation of the anti-discrimination provisions of the European Convention on Human Rights. Since this decision, cohabiting same-sex partners have been entitled to the same tenancy rights as unmarried cohabiting opposite-sex partners.

== Registered partnerships ==
=== Discussions in 2004–2006 ===
Between 2003 and 2007, the Social Democratic Party (SPÖ) and the Greens were in opposition while the government was led by the conservative Austrian People's Party (ÖVP). Both centre-left parties called for the recognition of same-sex unions. First, in June 2004, the Greens proposed a civil pact (Zivilpakt) modelled after the French civil solidarity pact. In December 2004, the SPÖ adopted a major policy decision on the issue of equal treatment for same-sex couples. In addition to calling for the introduction of registered partnerships, the party supported the investigation of opening marriage to same-sex couples. In May 2005, the Greens became the first major party to expressly call for the legalisation of same-sex marriage. The Greens praised the June 2005 referendum in Switzerland legalising registered partnerships and called for equal rights in Austria. In April 2006, the Vienna branch of the SPÖ followed the Greens in explicitly calling for the legalisation of marriage and adoption for same-sex couples.

=== Passage of legislation in 2009 ===
Following the October 2006 election, the conservative Schüssel Government was succeeded by an SPÖ-ÖVP grand coalition on 11 January 2007. In the "Perspectives" paper released by the People's Party on 1 October 2007, the coalition announced its support for registered partnerships (German: eingetragene Partnerschaft, pronounced [ˈaɪ̯nɡɛˌtraːɡɛnɛ ˈpartnɐʃaft]) (Note: Bavarian: Lemspartnaschoft, pronounced [ˈleːmsˌb̥ɑːd̥nɐʃɔfd̥]; Croatian: registrirano partnerstvo; Slovene: partnerska zveza) similar to the Swiss model. An agreed draft was released in late October 2007. It would have given couples in registered partnerships nearly the same rights as married couples, with the exception of adoption rights. The registered partnership bill, based on the Swiss model, was planned to be introduced to the Austrian Parliament in September 2008; however, as the coalition of Social Democrats and the Austrian People's Party broke apart and early elections were scheduled for 28 September 2008, progress was delayed. The two parties saw considerable losses in the election but continued their grand coalition under Chancellor Werner Faymann.

In February 2009, Interior Minister Maria Fekter set up a working group, inviting delegations from Austrian LGBT rights organizations, including the Lambda Legal Committee (RKL; Rechtskomitee Lambda), Pink and Lavender Panthers (RosaLila PantherInnen) as well as the Linz, Salzburg, Tyrol and Vienna branches of the Homosexual Initiative (HOSI; Homosexuelle Initiative), to hold talks on the issue of partnership recognition for same-sex couples. Fekter announced that a registered partnership bill would be introduced and enacted in autumn 2009 and would become effective on 1 January 2010. On 12 October 2009, the Greens urged the government to keep to its promise of having registered partnerships implemented by January 2010, with Green justice spokesman Albert Steinhauser saying that "time was running out" for the proposed law. The party also called for opening marriage to same-sex couples. The next day, Minister of Justice Claudia Bandion-Ortner announced that a registered partnership law would be announced "in a few weeks". She said that such a law was in the process of being drafted, with some aspects of it still being under contention. A particular area of contention was whether registered partnerships should include a ceremony at the Standesamt.

On 11 November 2009, Bandion-Ortner presented a bill, which was rejected by the SPÖ because the bill did not include ceremonies. On 17 November 2009, the Faymann Government finally approved the registered partnership bill proposed by the Ministry of Justice. Registered partnerships provide equal rights in labour, immigration, pension, tax, and civil law to same-sex couples as marriage does to opposite-sex couples. It also allows registered partners to take a common surname. The bill was passed on 10 December by the National Council in a 110–64 vote. The two governing parties voted in favour, while the Freedom Party of Austria (FPÖ) voted against and the Alliance for the Future of Austria (BZÖ) and the Greens voted mostly against. The Greens considered it a step in the right direction, but thought it did not go far enough. It was passed by the Federal Council in a 44–8 vote on 18 December. On 30 December, the law was published in the Bundesgesetzblatt, and took effect on 1 January 2010. The first four partnerships were registered in Vienna on 4 January 2010.

10 December 2009 vote in the National Council
| Party | Voted for | Voted against | Absent (Did not vote) |
|---|---|---|---|
| G Social Democratic Party | 55: Sonja Ablinger; Josef Auer; Petra Bayr; Ruth Becher; Gabriele Binder-Maier; Josef Cap; Renate Csörgits; Hannes Fazekas; Kurt Gartlehner; Andrea Gessl-Ranftl; Wilhelm Haberzettl; Marianne Hagenhofer; Elisabeth Hakel; Johann Hechtl; Anton Heinzl; Johann Hell; Johannes Jarolim; Erwin Kaipel; Wolfgang Katzian; Dietmar Keck; Franz Kirchgatterer; Gerhard Köfer; Ulrike Königsberger-Ludwig; Kai Jan Krainer; Günther Kräuter; Hermann Krist; Andrea Kuntzl; Hubert Kuzdas; Christine Lapp; Hermann Lipitsch; Rosa Lohfeyer; Angela Lueger; Johann Maier; Christoph Matznetter; Elmar Mayer; Josef Muchitsch; Christine Muttonen; Sabine Oberhauser; Otto Pendl; Rudolf Plessl; Stefan Prähauser; Barbara Prammer; Franz Riepl; Laura Rudas; Ewald Sacher; Rosemarie Schönpass; Walter Schopf; Heidrun Silhavy; Erwin Spindelberger; Peter Stauber; Gerhard Steier; Sonja Steßl-Mühlbacher; Hannes Weninger; Peter Wittmann; Gisela Wurm | – | 2: Christian Faul; Kurt Gaßner |
| G Austrian People's Party | 50: Werner Amon; Gertrude Aubauer; Jakob Auer; Martin Bartenstein; Katharina Cortolezis-Schlager; Karl Donabauer; Heribert Donnerbauer; Franz Eßl; Anna Franz; Silvia Fuhrmann; Adelheid Fürntrath-Moretti; Hermann Gahr; Franz Glaser; Fritz Grillitsch; Wolfgang Großruck; Karin Hakl; Johann Höfinger; Anna Höllerer; Franz Hörl; Erwin Hornek; Peter Michael Ikrath; Norbert Kapeller; Beatrix Karl; Oswald Klikovits; Karlheinz Kopf; Günter Kößl; Josef Lettenbichler; Ferdinand Maier; Peter Mayer; Wilhelm Molterer; Fritz Neugebauer; Gabriel Obernosterer; Jochen Pack; Ursula Plassnik; Michael Praßl; Nikolaus Prinz; Johann Rädler; Erwin Rasinger; Dorothea Schittenhelm; Johannes Schmuckenschlager; Bernd Schönegger; Hermann Schultes; Wolfgang Schüssel; Johann Singer; Peter Sonnberger; Ridi Steibl; Konrad Steindl; Günter Stummvoll; Gabriele Tamandl; August Wöginger | – | 1: Peter Haubner |
| Freedom Party | – | 30: Dagmar Belakowitsch-Jenewein; Gerhard Deimek; Rupert Doppler; Peter Fichtenbauer; Carmen Gartelgruber; Alois Gradauer; Martin Graf; Roman Haider; Werner Herbert; Christian Höbart; Johannes Hübner; Andreas Karlsböck; Herbert Kickl; Anneliese Kitzmüller; Werner Königshofer; Mario Kunasek; Gerhard Kurzmann; Christian Lausch; Leopold Mayerhofer; Edith Mühlberghuber; Werner Neubauer; Walter Rosenkranz; Harald Stefan; Heinz-Christian Strache; Bernhard Themessl; Harald Vilimsky; Bernhard Vock; Lutz Weinzinger; Susanne Winter; Wolfgang Zanger | 4: Heinz-Peter Hackl; Norbert Hofer; Harald Jannach; Heidemarie Unterreiner |
| Alliance for the Future of Austria | 3: Gerald Grosz; Kurt List; Peter Westenthaler | 17: Josef Bucher; Sigisbert Dolinschek; Christoph Hagen; Ursula Haubner; Gerhard Huber; Josef Jury; Maximilian Linder; Robert Lugar; Stefan Markowitz; Stefan Petzner; Herbert Scheibner; Martina Schenk; Wolfgang Spadiut; Martin Strutz; Erich Tadler; Rainer Widmann; Ernest Windholz | 1: Ewald Stadler |
| The Greens – The Green Alternative | 2: Christiane Brunner; Wolfgang Zinggl | 17: Dieter Brosz; Eva Glawischnig-Piesczek; Kurt Grünewald; Helene Jarmer; Werner Kogler; Ruperta Lichtenecker; Gabriela Moser; Daniela Musiol; Karl Öllinger; Peter Pilz; Wolfgang Pirklhuber; Birgit Schatz; Judith Schwentner; Albert Steinhauser; Alexander Van der Bellen; Harald Walser; Tanja Windbüchler-Souschill | 1: Alev Korun |
| Total | 110 | 64 | 9 |
| Total | 60.1% | 35.0% | 4.9% |

Lambda Legal Committee noted at the time the law was passed that there were 72 differences between registered partnerships and marriage. An opposite-sex couple applied for a registered partnership in February 2010, despite the legislation being created specifically for same-sex couples. The issue was mooted in December 2017 when the Constitutional Court ruled that the restriction of registered partnerships to same-sex couples was discriminatory and mandated that opposite-sex couples have the right to enter into registered partnerships from 1 January 2019.

=== Expansion of partnership rights ===
In January 2013, the Constitutional Court ruled that the registered partnership law was partially unconstitutional, broadening the rights of registered partners. On 19 February 2013, the European Court of Human Rights ruled in X and Others v. Austria that a partner in a same-sex union has the right to adopt his or her partner's biological child. On 5 July 2013, the Austrian Parliament passed the Adoption Law Amendment Act 2013 (Adoptionsrechts-Änderungsgesetz 2013), allowing stepchild adoption by same-sex couples. The law entered into force on 1 August 2013. In January 2015, the Constitutional Court found the existing adoption laws to be unconstitutional and ordered the laws to be changed by 31 December 2015 to allow joint adoption by same-sex couples. On 30 October 2015, Justice Minister Wolfgang Brandstetter announced that the ban would no longer be enforced from 1 January 2016, thus allowing the court's decision to automatically abolish the joint adoption ban.

In June 2013, in the run-up to that year's election, the newly founded liberal party NEOS – The New Austria published a policy position paper including support for equal rights for registered partners, including adoption rights. The SPÖ-ÖVP coalition government continued following the elections. Although the SPÖ had campaigned on an LGBT rights platform, the coalition agreement did not include any measures to expand LGBT rights, due to opposition from the conservative ÖVP.

In late September 2016, the ÖVP-led ministries agreed to remove two prominent differences between registered partnerships and marriages. These were allowing partnerships to be registered at the Standesamt rather than at the district authorities (Bezirkshauptmannschaften), and granting registered partners a regular family name (Familienname) rather than a last name (Nachname), which was specifically created for partnerships. Following approval by the Council of Ministers on 22 November 2016 and by Parliament on 15 December, the law took effect on 1 April 2017. The Deregulation and Adaptation Act 2016 (Deregulierungs- und Anpassungsgesetz 2016), which included various other unrelated changes such as amendments to the gun law, was approved by both governing parties and NEOS and opposed by the FPÖ, the Greens and Team Stronach. Opposition parties criticised mixing unrelated legal matters in one law.

=== Statistics ===
4,927 same-sex couples had entered into registered partnerships by the end of 2025, mostly in Vienna.

Number of partnerships registered in Austria
| State | 2010 | 2011 | 2012 | 2013 | 2014 | 2015 | 2016 | 2017 | 2018 | 2019 | 2020 | 2021 | 2022 | 2023 | 2024 | 2025 | Total |
|---|---|---|---|---|---|---|---|---|---|---|---|---|---|---|---|---|---|
| Burgenland | 12 | 7 | 7 | 10 | 8 | 1 | 8 | 11 | 8 | 2 | 0 | 0 | 1 | 1 | 2 | 0 | 78 |
| Carinthia | 17 | 20 | 12 | 22 | 23 | 22 | 22 | 22 | 14 | 3 | 3 | 2 | 4 | 2 | 2 | 2 | 192 |
| Lower Austria | 106 | 49 | 52 | 42 | 38 | 59 | 50 | 62 | 54 | 8 | 7 | 17 | 9 | 16 | 15 | 18 | 602 |
| Salzburg | 32 | 17 | 19 | 20 | 24 | 22 | 25 | 38 | 19 | 1 | 4 | 5 | 5 | 5 | 3 | 4 | 243 |
| Styria | 74 | 46 | 46 | 35 | 51 | 64 | 46 | 53 | 54 | 11 | 11 | 8 | 9 | 8 | 13 | 14 | 543 |
| Tyrol | 45 | 23 | 23 | 33 | 28 | 36 | 37 | 43 | 44 | 6 | 5 | 4 | 4 | 6 | 6 | 8 | 351 |
| Upper Austria | 58 | 43 | 41 | 32 | 36 | 42 | 58 | 60 | 51 | 8 | 7 | 9 | 7 | 13 | 9 | 2 | 476 |
| Vienna | 349 | 225 | 179 | 159 | 185 | 167 | 215 | 227 | 198 | 65 | 45 | 52 | 64 | 60 | 69 | 54 | 2,313 |
| Vorarlberg | 12 | 3 | 7 | 15 | 9 | 10 | 16 | 13 | 22 | 6 | 1 | 6 | 3 | 1 | 1 | 4 | 129 |
| Total | 705 | 433 | 386 | 368 | 402 | 423 | 477 | 529 | 464 | 110 | 83 | 103 | 106 | 112 | 120 | 106 | 4,927 |

Different-sex couples have been allowed to enter into registered partnerships since 1 January 2019. In 2019, 1,135 opposite-sex couples entered into such a union, followed by 1,173 more couples in 2020.

== Same-sex marriage ==
Laws regarding same-sex partnerships in Europe¹ Marriage Civil union Limited domestic recognition (cohabitation) Unrecognized Constitution limits marriage to opposite-sex couples ¹ May include recent laws or court decisions that have not yet entered into effect.

=== Background ===
Austria indirectly saw its first same-sex marriage in 2006 when the Constitutional Court granted a transgender woman the right to change her legal gender to female while remaining married to her wife. The court invalidated a regulation that required married transgender people to divorce before their new gender was legally recognised.

On 20 November 2013, the opposition Greens introduced a bill to the National Council to legalise same-sex marriage. It was sent to the Judiciary Committee on 17 December 2013 but was delayed by the ruling SPÖ-ÖVP coalition government. The bill was due to be debated in autumn 2014. In 2013, a same-sex couple, married in the Netherlands and resident in Austria, who wanted to get married under Austrian law to remove uncertainties regarding their marital status, filed a case with the Constitutional Court, but it was dismissed on 12 March 2014.

On 18 June 2015, the National Council rejected a proposal from the Greens requiring the Faymann Government to introduce same-sex marriage legislation. Out of 136 representatives, 26 voted for and 110 voted against the proposal. The Social Democrats voted against, pointing to the fact that their coalition partner, the Austrian People's Party, opposed same-sex marriage. NEOS supported the motion, while Team Stronach and the Freedom Party joined the two governing parties in opposing the proposal. Subsequently, an initiative "Ehe Gleich!" (pronounced [ˈeːɛ glaɪ̯ç]) was launched to force Parliament to reconsider legalising same-sex marriage. The Petitions Committee of the National Council started considering the initiative on 17 November 2015, and called on the Ministry of Justice, led by Minister Wolfgang Brandstetter, and the Ministry of Families, led by Minister Sophie Karmasin, to state their positions. The Ministry of Families claimed that this issue fell outside of its area of responsibility, while the Ministry of Justice said that extending marriage to same-sex couples was "not necessary". In November 2015, the "Ehe Gleich!" initiators further filed a lawsuit challenging the same-sex marriage ban. The case was dismissed by the Vienna Administrative Court on 21 December 2015. The plaintiffs appealed to the Constitutional Court. A second same-sex marriage lawsuit was heard in the Upper Austrian Administrative Court in Linz on 21 March 2016, but was dismissed by the court on 15 April 2016.

On 30 June 2016, the Petitions Committee of the National Council, which had previously asked for the positions of the ÖVP-led Ministries of Justice and Families, considered the "Ehe Gleich!" initiative again and requested the positions of other (SPÖ-led) ministries. The Ministry of Social Affairs, led by Minister Alois Stöger, responded unequivocally in favour of legalisation. The Ministry of Health and Women, led by Minister Sabine Oberhauser, also responded in favour. These responses were followed by further calls from party colleagues for the legalisation of same-sex marriage, while the coalition partner ÖVP largely remained silent on the issue. However, the Constitutional Office, led by Minister Thomas Drozda, gave a response which was similar to the ÖVP-led ministries, rather than in line with what his SPÖ colleagues stated. Subsequently, the Office of Federal Chancellor Christian Kern, only in office for a few months, stated that same-sex marriage should be legalised. As the Constitutional Office falls under the Office of the Chancellor, the latter's position superseded Drozda's position that had not been in line with the other SPÖ ministers. On 6 October 2016, the "Ehe Gleich!" initiative was considered again by the Petitions Committee, which decided to ask for an international legal comparison by the Ministry of Foreign Affairs. This meant the initiative would remain pending until at least January 2017. On 18 January 2017, the Committee asked for an opinion from the national civil servants association. In May 2017, when snap elections were called for 15 October 2017, the Greens proposed a summer deadline for the introduction of same-sex marriage. However, this was rejected by Parliament, with only NEOS supporting the Greens' proposal.

=== Constitutional Court ruling ===
On 12 October 2017, the Constitutional Court agreed to consider one of the cases challenging the law barring same-sex marriage. On 4 December 2017, the court struck down the ban as unconstitutional, ruling that preventing same-sex couples from marrying violates the principles of equality and non-discrimination guaranteed by the Constitution of Austria. It also found that restricting registered partnerships to same-sex couples was unconstitutional and ordered the institution open to different-sex couples. The ruling would come into force on 1 January 2019, though the Parliament had the option to change the law sooner, and also allowed the couples involved in the challenge to marry immediately. On 6 December, the Social Democrats, who had introduced a bill to legalise same-sex marriage on 9 November 2017, said they would continue to campaign for its passage, in the hopes of allowing same-sex couples to marry sooner than 1 January 2019. Another same-sex marriage bill was introduced by MP Nikolaus Scherak on 13 December. On 31 January 2018, SPÖ deputies withdrew their bill and introduced a new one. In September 2018, Justice Minister Josef Moser began preparations to implement the ruling. No further action was taken on any of the bills prior to the ruling's entry into force, as the conservative government of Chancellor Sebastian Kurz opposed same-sex marriage. On 12 October, the first same-sex marriage was performed in Vienna for a lesbian couple, one of the five plaintiff couples that had challenged the same-sex marriage ban in court. Unlike other couples (who had to wait until 1 January 2019), the Constitutional Court allowed the plaintiff couples to marry immediately after its ruling legalizing same-sex marriage. Ultimately, same-sex marriage became legal on 1 January 2019, as the Parliament took no action to legalize it sooner.

Article 44 of the Allgemeines bürgerliches Gesetzbuch now reads: Family relationships are established by the contract of marriage. In a marriage contract, two persons legally declare their will to live in an inseparable community, to rear children, to educate them, and to afford each other mutual aid. (Note: German: Die Familien-Verhältnisse werden durch den Ehevertrag gegründet. In dem Ehevertrage erklären zwey Personen gesetzmäßig ihren Willen, in unzertrennlicher Gemeinschaft zu leben, Kinder zu zeugen, sie zu erziehen und sich gegenseitigen Beystand zu leisten.) Previously, the article contained the text "of the opposite sex" (verschiedenen Geschlechtes) after "persons" (Personen). This was repealed, effective from 1 January 2019.

=== Subsequent changes ===
Days after the decision of the Constitutional Court came into effect on 1 January, the Ministry of the Interior instructed registries in Austria not to perform same-sex marriages if one of the spouses came from a country or territory that had not legalised same-sex marriage. This was controversial, and in June 2019 the Social Democrats pledged to repeal this directive. Legal Committee Lambda filed a challenge in court. On 26 June, the Judiciary Committee of the National Council passed a bill introduced by MP Irmgard Griss to amend the Private International Law Act (German: Gesetz über das internationale Privatrecht) to allow same-sex marriages even if one of the spouses' homeland does not recognize such unions. On 2 July, the bill was approved by the National Council with only the Freedom Party opposed. The legislation was approved by the Federal Council on 11 July, published in the Bundesgesetzblatt, and took effect on 1 August 2019.

Another notable discrimination for same-sex couples concerned couples who had married abroad before 1 January 2019. Their relationship would not be automatically registered as a marriage upon coming back home in Austria, and the couples had to divorce first and then re-marry. An application to end this unequal treatment was submitted by SPÖ equal treatment spokesman Mario Lindner to the Committee on Internal Affairs in January 2019. RKL said that should the Ministry of the Interior insist on not rectifying this matter they would file a constitutional challenge in court. The Ministry issued regulations on 26 February 2019 permitting foreign same-sex marriages to be registered in Austria.

=== Statistics ===
By the end of 2025, 5,294 same-sex marriages had been performed in Austria.

Number of same-sex marriages performed in Austria
| State | 2019 | 2020 | 2021 | 2022 | 2023 | 2024 | 2025 | Total |
|---|---|---|---|---|---|---|---|---|
| Burgenland | 12 | 7 | 14 | 16 | 28 | 20 | 23 | 120 |
| Carinthia | 67 | 33 | 35 | 45 | 30 | 50 | 52 | 312 |
| Lower Austria | 139 | 95 | 97 | 129 | 127 | 129 | 117 | 833 |
| Salzburg | 39 | 37 | 42 | 48 | 50 | 41 | 45 | 302 |
| Styria | 118 | 75 | 67 | 107 | 97 | 95 | 100 | 659 |
| Tyrol | 84 | 42 | 65 | 71 | 53 | 66 | 62 | 443 |
| Upper Austria | 92 | 69 | 71 | 106 | 92 | 88 | 102 | 620 |
| Vienna | 285 | 231 | 215 | 255 | 279 | 289 | 268 | 1,822 |
| Vorarlberg | 24 | 23 | 26 | 14 | 29 | 30 | 37 | 183 |
| Total | 860 | 612 | 632 | 791 | 785 | 808 | 806 | 5,294 |

=== Religious performance ===
The Evangelical Church of the Augsburg Confession in Austria has allowed its congregations to bless same-sex marriages since 2019. Couples who have first had a civil marriage can have their union blessed at the church service. The measure was passed by the synod with a two-thirds majority in March 2019. The Church, with an estimated 265,000 followers, became the largest Christian denomination in Austria to offer same-sex marriages. The smaller Reformed Church in Austria has also allowed solemnizations of same-sex marriages since 2019. The Old Catholic Church of Austria has performed blessings of same-sex relationships since the late 1990s. In 2019, it began discussing the possibility of blessing same-sex marriages, and on 3 July 2022 the synod passed a measure allowing same-sex couples to marry in the church.

The Catholic Church opposes same-sex marriage and does not allow its priests to officiate at such marriages. In December 2023, the Holy See published Fiducia supplicans, a declaration allowing Catholic priests to bless couples who are not considered to be married according to church teaching, including the blessing of same-sex couples. The Archbishop of Salzburg, Franz Lackner, reacted to the declaration, "I believe that the Church recognizes that a relationship between two of the same sex is not entirely without truth: there is love, there is loyalty, there is also hardship shared and lived in faithfulness. This should also be recognized", adding that "[b]asically, one can no longer say no" to a same-sex couple's request for a blessing. Blessings of same-sex unions are allowed in the Diocese of Linz.

== Public opinion ==
The 2006 Eurobarometer poll surveying up to 30,000 people showed that support for same-sex marriage among Austrians was at 49%, higher than the EU average of 44%. A November 2013 poll by Market for Der Standard found that 61% of Austrians supported same-sex marriage (41% "fully" and 20% "somewhat"), while 33% were opposed (15% "fully" and 18% "somewhat"). Adoption by same-sex couples was supported by 56% of respondents (35% "fully" and 21% "somewhat") and opposed by 37% (22% "fully" and 15% "somewhat"). A May 2014 poll by Market for ORF found that support had increased to 73% (48% "fully" and 25% "somewhat"), while 24% of respondents were opposed (15% "fully" and 9% "somewhat"), and 3% did not answer. Support was higher among women and younger people.

The 2015 Eurobarometer found that 62% of Austrians thought same-sex marriage should be allowed throughout Europe, while 32% were opposed. A July 2017 poll for Österreich found that 59% of Austrians supported same-sex marriage and 25% were against, while 16% did not answer. The poll showed that 79% of NEOS voters supported same-sex marriage, as did 73% of Green voters, 71% of SPÖ voters, 56% of ÖVP voters, and 46% of FPÖ voters. A Pew Research Center poll, conducted between April and August 2017 and published in May 2018, showed that 72% of Austrians supported same-sex marriage, 25% were opposed and 3% did not know or refused to answer. When divided by religion, 87% of religiously unaffiliated people, 86% of non-practicing Christians and 42% of church-attending Christians supported same-sex marriage.

A September 2018 poll for Österreich found that 74% of Austrians supported same-sex marriage and 26% were opposed. The 2019 Eurobarometer found that 66% of Austrians thought same-sex marriage should be allowed throughout Europe, while 30% were opposed. The 2023 Eurobarometer showed that support was similar, at 65%, while 30% were opposed. The survey also found that 66% of Austrians thought that "there is nothing wrong in a sexual relationship between two persons of the same sex", while 28% disagreed.

== See also ==
- LGBT rights in Austria
- Schalk and Kopf vs. Austria
- X and Others v. Austria
- Recognition of same-sex unions in Europe
