= X and Others v. Austria =

European Court of Human Rights case

Submitted 5 June 2007 Decided 19 Feb 2013
- Full case name: X and Others v. Austria
- Case type: Human Rights
- Chamber: Grand Chamber
- Nationality of parties: Austrian

Ruling
- Austrian government discriminated against unmarried same-sex couples by not allowing them to access second-parent adoptions under s179 Austrian Civil Code

Court composition
- President; Dean Spielmann
- Judges: Josep Casadevall; Guido Raimondi; Inieta Ziemele; Nina Vajic; Lech Garlicki; Peer Lorenzen; Anatoly Kovler; Elisabeth Steiner; Khanlar Hajiyev; Egbert Myjer; Danute Jociene; Jan Sikuta; Vincent A. De Gaetano; Linos-Alexandre Sicilianos; Erik Mose; Andre Potocki

Instruments cited
- European Convention on Human Rights Austrian Civil Code

Legislation affecting
- Austrian Civil Code

X and Others v. Austria, Application No. 19010/07, was a human rights case that was decided in 2013 by the European Court of Human Rights (ECtHR). The case concerned whether the Government of Austria had discriminated against Austrian citizens who were in same-sex relationships because the wording of the Austrian Civil Code (German: Allgemeines bürgerliches Gesetzbuch) did not permit unmarried same-sex couples access to legally granted second-parent adoptions, whereas it was available to unmarried heterosexual couples.

X and Others v. Austria is viewed by international legal scholars as being the first recognition of the right of unmarried same-sex couples to second-parent adoption in European States that are a party to the European Convention on Human Rights (ECHR). However, the European Court of Human Rights considered the ruling built on discrimination protections that have been established as part of the body of LGBT rights in Europe.

== Background information ==
=== LGBT adoption rights in the European Union ===
LGBT rights have been established in a number of different countries in a response to a shift in social attitudes towards the LGBT community. Some of those rights concern LGBT parenting which encompasses the legal provisions relevant to the paternal rights that can be granted to individuals who identify with the LGBT community.

Adoption is one of the LGBT parental rights that is recognised to exist in some European states. However, the LGBT community has historically had difficulty in being granted the legal rights to adoption and currently only 19 out of the 56 European States have made adoption legal to members of the LGBT community. There was widespread public opposition against the idea of LGBT adoption, arising from concern about the developmental health of children raised in LGBT families. A pervasive view existed that the biological child needs a parent of either sex to experience healthy development. This view was seen to justify restricting adoption to same-sex couples. However, as social attitudes towards the LGBT community have begun to shift, the LGBT community have been incrementally granted legal rights. Scientific research into childhood development has concluded that children growing up in same-sex families are not disadvantaged.

Human rights law is a body of law that covers LGBT individuals and their right to live in society. The human rights regime is governed by the European Convention on Human Rights within the Council of Europe. Alleged violations of an individual's human rights by a contracting State within the Council of Europe can be brought before the European Court of Human Rights.

Adoption by same-sex couples had already come before the Court on a number of occasions. In 1999 the ECtHR ruled that in the context of awarding custody to one parent or another, difference in treatment based solely on considerations of sexual orientation was impermissible by the ECHR. The European Court of Human Rights first considered a lesbian or gay individual's rights to adoption in Frette v France. In that case the ECtHR found that denying a single homosexual man the right to adopt a child did not violate the ECHR. In E.B and France, the ECtHR distinguished the case from Frette finding that making a distinction based on sexual orientation was impermissible under the ECHR. Finally in Gas & Dubois v France two women living in a same-sex relationship sought an adoption order to allow one of the partner's children to be adopted by the other partner. When the French Government denied their request, they appealed to the ECtHr. However, the ECtHR found that only couples who were married could obtain this form of adoption and because the couple could not form a marriage they could not enjoy its special legal status.

== Decision of the European Court of Human Rights ==
=== Prior history of the case ===
X and her partner were living together in a stable same-sex relationship. X's partner was previously married and had given birth to a child with her husband. X's partner now had sole custody of the child. X sought court approval of the second-parent adoption such that the relationship with the biological father and his relatives under family law would cease to exist while the relationship with the biological mother would remain fully intact. However, the child's father still recognised his paternal legal rights and refused to grant his consent to the adoption. The applicants wanted the court to override the father's refusal for consent as he displayed the utmost antagonism towards the family.

Austrian law recognised many different forms of adoption, however it prevented second-parent adoptions made by homosexual couples in accordance with s182(2) of the Austrian Civil Code. Section 182(2) provided for second-parent adoption if the adopting parents had formed a marriage. Importantly, it did not prevent unmarried heterosexual couples from doing so. X concluded an adoption agreement and sent in to the Austrian District Court for approval, knowing it would be denied. The domestic court argued that the father refused to give his consent and that the adoption requested by them was in any case not possible under Austrian law. Upon that verdict, X and her partner applied to the Constitutional Court of Austria to have the s179 declared unconstitutional because it discriminated against them on the basis of their sexual orientation. They argued that in the case of an opposite-sex couple, the District Court would have carried out a detailed examination (as to whether override the father's refusal or not) and would have had to deliver a separate decision on this issue. However, in the applicants’ case it had denied them any inquiry of the facts on the ground that the adoption requested by them was in any case not possible under Austrian law. The Constitutional Court of Austria refused to do so and rendered the request inadmissible.

=== Facts ===
X, her partner and her biological child appealed to the European Court of Human Rights and appeared as joint applicants.

After argument and deliberation the Grand Chamber of the European Court of Human Rights held by a 10-7 majority that the Austrian government violated article 8 and article 14 of the European Convention on Human Rights when taken together. The Court distinguished Gas and Dubois v. France finding there was no legitimate and proportionate aim in restricting second-parent adoption to unmarried heterosexual couples. X and her partner were found to have been discriminated against as they could not obtain a second-parent adoption but unmarried couples living together in a stable heterosexual relationship could.

=== articles. 8 and 14 of the European Convention of Human Rights ===
The ECtHR observed that the three applicants lived together in a situation that was alike to that of a heterosexual family unit.

The European Convention on Human Rights provided the human rights framework which the Court examined in relation to Austrian adoption laws. Articles 8 and 14 are relevant to LGBT adoption. Article 8 provides that “everyone has a right to respect for his family and private life, his home and his correspondence” and Article 14 prevents discrimination based on any grounds such as “sex, race, colour, language, religion, political or other opinion, national or social origin, association with a national minority, property, birth or other status”. While article 8 is a substantive right conferred by the ECHR, article 14 is considered to be dependent on the other articles as it protects the freedoms that have been granted by the other articles in the Convention.

The Court noted that the Austrian government did not have to extend second-parent adoptions to unmarried heterosexual couples and because it did, it was required to justify why it didn't extend it to unmarried same-sex couples also. The Austrian government argued that the Austrian Civil Code was justified on the basis that it aimed to recreate the biological circumstances of the family unit, and the margin of appreciation should be wide in the case of adoption and that no formal consensus in Europe existed on the issue of second-parent adoptions.

=== Dissenting opinion ===
The seven dissenting judges also gave a combined opinion. They held the denial of second-parent adoption was not a violation of the ECHR as the Court should not have examined the legislation, but rather the particular circumstances in the case, because it was uncertain whether adoption, in this case, was in the child's best interests.

== Role in subsequent decisions and policy ==
Although the decision appears to be important in extending LGBT rights to adoption, the European Court of Human Rights themselves carefully limited the scope of their ruling. It chose to frame ‘’X and Others v. Austria’’ narrowly, as a matter of alleged discrimination between unmarried heterosexual and homosexual couples, rather than a ruling on the issue of second-parent adoption.

However, subsequent commentators have questioned that interpretation, in effect in being that same as considering X and Others v. Austria as being the first time in which the European Court of Human Rights has recognised the right to second-parent adoption by same-sex couples.

== See also ==
- LGBT community
- LGBT parenting
- LGBT adoption
- European Court of Human Rights
- European Convention on Human Rights
- Austrian Civil Code
