= LGBTQ rights in the European Union =

LGBTQ rights in European Union
- European Union
- Legal status: Never criminalised in EU law. Last state criminalisation repealed in 1998.
- Military: Allowed to serve openly in all states
- Discrimination protections: Outlawed in employment with further protections in some member states' law

Family rights
- Recognition of relationships: Same-sex marriage in 16/27 states Recognition of same-sex unions in 24/27 states No recognition of same-sex couples in 3/27 states European Court of Justice ruling requires recognition of same-sex marriages conducted in another member state, however states aren't obliged to perform them domestically. (Cupriak-Trojan and Trojan v Wojewoda Mazowiecki)
- Restrictions: Same-sex marriage constitutional ban in 7/27 states.
- Adoption: Joint adoption in 18/27 states Step-child adoption in 19/27 states

The rights of lesbian, gay, bisexual, transgender, and queer (LGBTQ) people are protected under the European Union's (EU) treaties and law. Same-sex sexual activity is legal in all EU member states and discrimination in employment has been banned since 2000. However, EU states have different laws when it comes to any greater protection, same-sex civil union, same-sex marriage, and adoption by same-sex couples. On 25 November 2025, the European Court of Justice (ECJ) ruled that member states must recognise same-sex marriages lawfully concluded in another member state, even though they are not obliged to legalise same-sex marriage domestically.

== Treaty protections ==
The Treaty on European Union, in its last version as updated by the Treaty of Lisbon in 2007 and in force as of 2009, makes the Charter of Fundamental Rights of the European Union legally binding for the member states of the European Union when applying EU law, and the European Union itself. In turn, Article 21 of the Charter of Fundamental Rights of the European Union includes an anti-discrimination provision that states that "any discrimination based on any ground such as [...] sexual orientation shall be prohibited."

Furthermore, the Treaty on the Functioning of the European Union provides in Articles 10 that the European Union has a positive duty to combat discrimination (among other things) on the grounds of sexual orientation and provides in Article 19 ways for the Council and the European Parliament to actively propose pass legislation to do so. These provisions were enacted by the Treaty of Amsterdam in 1999.

== Legislative protection ==
Lesbian, gay, bisexual (left image) and trans (right image) rights in the European Union.

=== Discrimination in employment ===
Following the inclusion in the Treaties of the above-mentioned provisions, Directive 2000/78/EC "Directive establishing a general framework for equal treatment in employment and occupation" was enacted in 2000. This framework directive compels all EU states to adopt anti-discrimination legislation in employment. That legislation has to include provisions to protect people from discrimination on the basis of sexual orientation.

In practice, this protects EU citizens from being refused a job, or from being fired, because of their sexual orientation; it also protects them from being harassed by a colleague due to their sexual orientation.

==== EU staff ====
While Directive 2000/78/CE does not technically apply to the EU institutions themselves, the EU Staff Regulations provide in Article 1d:

In the application of these Staff Regulations, any discrimination based on any ground such as sex, race, colour, ethnic or social origin, genetic features, language, religion or belief, political or any other opinion, membership of a national minority, property, birth, disability, age, or sexual orientation shall be prohibited.
For the purposes of these Staff Regulations, non-marital partnerships shall be treated as marriage provided that all the conditions listed in Article 1(2)(c) of Annex VII are fulfilled.

And the conditions listed in Article 1(2)(c) of Annex VII are the following:

(i) the couple produces a legal document recognised as such by a Member State, or any competent authority of a Member State, acknowledging their status as non-marital partners,
(ii) neither partner is in a marital relationship or in another non-marital partnership,
(iii) the partners are not related in any of the following ways: parent, child, grandparent, grandchild, brother, sister, aunt, uncle, nephew, niece, son-in-law, daughter-in-law,
(iv) the couple has no access to legal marriage in a Member State; a couple shall be considered to have access to legal marriage for the purposes of this point only where the members of the couple meet all the conditions laid down by the legislation of a Member State permitting marriage of such a couple

Thereby, the Staff Regulations outlaw discrimination of EU staff based on sex (which includes gender reassignment) or sexual orientation and guarantee that registered same-sex couples are not excluded from benefits awarded to married couples due to not having access to the institution of marriage.

=== Discrimination in the provisioning of goods and services ===
Directive 2000/78/EC does not cover being refused medical services or treatment, refusal of being given a double room in a hotel, protection from bullying in a school and refusal of social security schemes (e.g. survivors' pensions and financial assistance to carers). Protection under EU law in these circumstances exists, but is granted on the grounds of race or gender only.

As such, in 2008, a proposal of a Directive to more broadly fight discrimination has been introduced, which would outlaw discrimination in the areas of social protection, social advantages, education and access to supply of goods, on the basis of religious belief, disability, age, and sexual orientation. However, despite strong support from the European Parliament, the directive has since been stalled in the Council.

=== Transgender rights ===
EU law currently takes a different approach to transgender issues. Despite the European Parliament adopting a resolution on transgender rights as early as 1989, transgender identity is not incorporated into any EU funding and was not mentioned in the law establishing the European Institute for Gender Equality (EIGE) as sexual orientation was. However, the case law of the European Court of Justice (ECJ) provides some protection by interpreting discrimination on the basis of 'sex' to also refer to people who have had 'gender reassignment'. Thus all EU sex discrimination law applies to transgender people. However, the literature criticised this approach, and there are calls to protect transgender people against discrimination based on their gender identity instead of sex. In 2002, the 1976 equal treatment directive was revised to include discrimination based on gender identity, to reflect case law on the directive. Transgender EU citizens have faced difficulties when exercising their right to free movement and other rights associated with their Union citizenship status. In October 2024, the ECJ ruled that EU member states must recognise changes to names and gender markers obtained in other member states, based on the right to free movement.

=== Intersex rights ===
In February 2019, the European Parliament adopted a resolution on the rights of intersex people. The resolution called European Union member states to legislate better policies that protected intersex individuals, especially from unnecessary surgery and discrimination. It stated that the parliament "strongly condemns sex-normalizing treatments and surgery; welcomes laws that prohibit such surgery, as in Malta and Portugal, and encourages other member states to adopt similar legislation as soon as possible." The resolution also urged legal gender recognition based on self-determination. It also confirms that intersex people are "exposed to multiple instances of violence and discrimination in the European Union" and calls on the European Commission and the Members States to propose legislation to address these issues. It also includes the need of adequate counselling and support for intersex people and their families, measures to end the stigma and pathologisation intersex people face and increased funding for intersex-led civil society organisations.

== Other actions ==
Between 2001 and 2006, a Community Action Programme to Combat Discrimination involved the expenditure of €100 million to fight discrimination in a number of areas, including sexual orientation.

In 2009, the European Commission has acted to tone down a law in Lithuania that included homophobic language and also aimed to support the gay pride parade in the country and others under threat of banning.

== Foreign relations ==
In June 2010, the Council of the European Union adopted a non-binding toolkit to promote LGBTQ people's human rights.

In June 2013, the Council upgraded it to binding LGBTI Guidelines instructing EU diplomats around the world to defend the human rights of LGBTI people.

== Same-sex unions ==
Same-sex unions in the European Union Marriage Civil unions Unregistered cohabitation Residency rights for foreign spouses

Same-sex marriage has been legalised in Austria, Belgium, Denmark, Estonia, Finland, France, Germany, Greece, Ireland, Luxembourg, Malta, the Netherlands, Portugal, Slovenia, Spain, and Sweden. Same-sex civil unions have been legalised in Austria, Belgium, Croatia, Cyprus, Czechia, Estonia, France, Greece, Hungary, Italy, Latvia, Lithuania, Luxembourg, Malta, the Netherlands, and Spain. In Denmark, Sweden, Finland, and Ireland, civil partnerships were legal between 1989 and 2012, and between 1995 and 2009, and between 2002 and 2017, and between 2011 and 2015, respectively. In Germany, registered life partnerships were legal between 2001 and 2017. However, existing civil unions/registered life partnerships are still recognised in all of these countries.

Bulgaria, Lithuania, Poland and Slovakia have constitutionally defined marriage as being between a man and a woman. In December 2020, Hungary also explicitly legally banned adoption for same-sex couples within its constitution.

European Union law (the Citizens’ Rights Directive 2004/38/EC) requires those member states that legalised same-sex partnerships to recognise each other's partnerships for the purpose of freedom of movement. The European Parliament has however approved a report calling for mutual recognition.

According to European Court of Justice case law based on the Employment Equality Framework Directive, employees in a civil partnership with a same-sex partner must be granted the same benefits as those granted to their colleagues upon their marriage, where marriage is not possible for same-sex couples. The Court established this principle in 2008 in the case of Tadao Maruko v. Versorgungsanstalt der deutschen Bühnen with regards to a German registered life partnership. In December 2013, the Court confirmed this in the case of Frédéric Hay v. Crédit agricole mutuel (C-267/12) with regards to a French civil solidarity pact, which is significantly inferior to marriage than a German registered life partnership.

Also, according to the European Court of Justice in the case of Coman and Others, by judgement of 5 June 2018, a "spouse" (or partner or any other family member) in the Free Movement Directive (2004/38/EC) includes a (foreign) same-sex spouse; member states are required to confer the right of residence on the (foreign) same-sex spouse of a citizen of the European Union. EU member countries that do not recognise same-sex unions themselves are still bound by a ruling by the European Court of Justice to recognise same-sex marriages performed within the EU and including an EU citizen for the purposes of granting legal residence, though they do not always respect this ruling in practice (in case of Romania is still ignoring implementation of the ruling).

On 25 November 2025, the European Court of Justice ruled in Cupriak-Trojan and Trojan v Wojewoda Mazowiecki that member states must recognise same-sex marriages lawfully concluded in another member state. The judges note that their decision does not oblige member states to amend their domestic legislation to recognise same-sex marriage, instead simply requiring them to recognise marriages lawfully concluded in another EU country. The procedure must be applied "without distinction or additional hurdles". The ruling expanded upon Coman and Others, which had been ignored by countries like Romania, Poland, Slovakia, Hungary, and Bulgaria.

=== Family rights ===
In 2021, 10 EU member states refused to recognize same-sex couples as joint parents to their children. This leads to situations where two people recognized as parents in one country would have their family ties legally dissolve after crossing a border. A frequently encountered issue is that birth certificates issued in one member state and listing two people of the same sex as parents are not recognized in other countries. Some children do not have passports as a result. The pending CJEU case V.M.A. v. Stolichna Obsthina involves a child who could not claim Bulgarian nationality because her parents were a lesbian couple. A policy brief commissioned by European Parliament Committee on Petitions recommends that the European Commission or the CJEU should clarify that Directive 2004/38 on free movement also applies to rainbow families, who should not be discriminated against in their exercise of EU free movement rights. The case was finally decided on 14 December 2021, with the CJEU accepting the position of the European Parliament Committee on Petitions, and finding Bulgaria in breach of EU law for not issuing documents to the child of the lesbian couple. The decision points out that while it is still a Member State's prerogative to decide whether or not to extend same-sex marriage and LGBTQ adoption rights to its own citizen, this choice cannot come at the expense of the child being deprived of the relationship of one of her parents while exercising her rights to freedom of movement within the EU.

== Conversion therapy ==
In March 2018, a majority of representatives in the European Parliament passed a resolution in a 435–109 vote condemning conversion therapy and urging European Union member states to ban the practice. A report released by the European Parliament Intergroup on LGBT Rights after the measure was passed stated that "Currently, only Malta and some regions in Spain have explicitly banned LGBTI conversion therapies." Conversion therapy for minors was banned in Germany in 2020, in France in 2022, and in Belgium, Cyprus, and Portugal in 2023. Bans have also been proposed in Ireland, Netherlands and Austria.

On 24 January 2024, the European Commission registered a European Citizens' Initiative to ban conversion therapy and the signature collection period started on 17 May of the same year. For the initiative to be successful, organizers have until 17 May 2025 to gather at least one million statements of support, as well as reach a minimum threshold in at least seven countries.

== Member State laws on sexual orientation ==
Openly gay people are allowed to serve in the military of every EU country since 2018.

In December 2016, Malta became the first country in the EU – as well as in Europe – to ban conversion therapy.

LGBTQ rights in:	Unregistered cohabitation	Civil union	Marriage	Adoption	Anti-discrimination laws	Hate crime/speech laws
Austria	Yes (Since 2003)	Yes (Registered Partnership since 2010)	Yes (Since 2019)	Yes (Since 2016)	All	Yes
Belgium	No	Yes (Legal Cohabitation since 2000)	Yes (Since 2003)	Yes (Since 2006)	All	Yes
Bulgaria	No	No	Constitutional ban since 1991	No	All	Yes
Croatia	Yes (Since 2003)	Yes (Life Partnership since 2014)	Constitutional ban since 2013	Yes (Since 2022)	All	Yes
Cyprus	No	Yes (Civil Cohabitation since 2015)	No	No	All	Yes
Czech Republic	Yes (Since 2001)	Yes (Registered Partnership since 2006, "broadened and expanded" since 2025)	No	Yes (Step-child or partial adoption since 2025; No full joint adoption)	All	Yes
Denmark	Yes (Since 1986)	Registered Partnership from 1989 to 2012; certain partnerships are still recognised	Yes (Since 2012)	Yes (Since 2010)	All	Yes
Estonia	No	Yes (Cohabitation Agreement since 2016)	Yes (Since 2024)	Yes (Since 2024)	All	Yes
Finland	No	Registered Partnership from 1989 to 2012; certain partnerships are still recognised	Yes (Since 2017)	Yes (Since 2017)	All	Yes
France	Yes (Since 1999)	Yes (Civil Solidarity Pact since 1999)	Yes (Since 2013)	Yes (Since 2013)	All	Yes
Germany	No	Life Partnership from 2001 to 2017; certain partnerships are still recognised	Yes (Since 2017)	Yes (Since 2017)	All	Yes
Greece	No	Yes (Cohabitation Agreement since 2015)	Yes (Since 2024)	Yes (Since 2024)	All	Yes
Hungary	Yes (Since 1996)	Yes (Registered Partnership since 2009)	Constitutional ban since 2012	Constitutional ban since 2020	All	Yes
(Republic of Ireland) Ireland	Yes (Since 2011)	Civil Partnership from 2011 to 2015; certain partnerships are still recognised	Yes (since 2015)	Yes (Since 2017)	All	Yes
Italy	Yes (since 2016)	Yes (Civil Union since 2016)	In 2018 the Supreme Court ruled that same-sex marriages performed abroad must be registered as civil unions	Stepchild adoption admitted by the Court of Cassation since 2016	Some	No
Latvia	No	Yes (Partnership since 2024)	Constitutional ban since 2006	No	Some	No
Lithuania	No	Yes (Partnership since 2025)	Constitutional ban since 1992	Stepchild adoption admitted by the judiciary since 2024	All	Yes
Luxembourg	No	Yes (Partnership since 2004)	Yes (Since 2015)	Yes (Since 2015)	All	Yes
Malta	Yes (Since 2017)	Yes (Civil Union since 2014)	Yes (Since 2017)	Yes (Since 2014)	All	Yes
Netherlands	Yes (Since 1979)	Yes (Registered Partnership since 1998)	Yes (Since 2001)	Yes (Since 2001)	All	Yes
Poland	Yes (Since 2012)	No	Constitutional ban since 1997	No	Some	No
Portugal	Yes (De facto union since 2001)	No	Yes (Since 2010)	Yes (Since 2016)	All	Yes
Romania	No	No	No	No	All	Yes
Slovakia	Yes (Limited rights for "close person" recognized under civil and penal law since 2018)	No	Constitutional ban since 2014	Constitutional ban since 2025	All	Yes
Slovenia	Yes (Since 2006)	Registered Partnership from 2006 to 2023	Yes (Since 2022)	Yes (Since 2022)	All	Yes
Spain	Yes (Since 1995)	Yes (All regions and autonomous cities of Spain since 2018)	Yes (Since 2005)	Yes (Since 2005)	All	Yes
Sweden	Yes (Since 1988)	Registered Partnership from 1995 to 2009; certain partnerships are still recognised	Yes (Since 2009)	Yes (Since 2003)	All	Yes

Due to the Cyprus dispute placing Northern Cyprus outside the Republic of Cyprus' control, EU law is suspended in the area governed by the self-proclaimed Turkish Republic of Northern Cyprus.

LGBTQ rights in:	Civil union	Marriage	Adoption	Anti-discrimination laws	Hate crime/speech laws
Northern Cyprus	No	No	No	All	Yes

== Public opinion ==
=== Recent statistics ===
Below is the share of respondents per country who agreed with the following statements in the 2023 Eurobarometer on Discrimination in the European Union. For comparison, green background in the second column indicates that the country allows full joint adoption for same-sex couples (silver background some form of second-parent adoption) and green background in the third column that it allows same-sex marriage (silver background for some form of civil partnership).

Member state	Equal rights for lesbian, gay, and bisexual people compared to heterosexual people (marriage, adoption, parental rights)^{[a]}	Legalisation of same-sex marriages throughout Europe	Equal rights for transgender people compared to anyone else (marriage, adoption, parental rights)	Change (2019-2023) regarding the legalisation of same-sex marriages (in percentage points)
European Union	69%	72%	64%	+3
Austria	59%	65%	58%	-1
Belgium	77%	79%	72%	-3
Bulgaria	21%	17%	21%	+1
Croatia	35%	42%	33%	+3
Cyprus	45%	50%	43%	+14
Czech Republic	54%	60%	43%	+12
Denmark	92%	93%	88%	+4
Estonia	37%	41%	34%	+0
Finland	75%	76%	71%	+0
France	78%	79%	70%	+0
Germany	81%	84%	74%	+0
Greece	44%	57%	42%	+18
Hungary	44%	42%	42%	+9
Ireland	84%	86%	80%	+7
Italy	63%	69%	60%	+11
Latvia	39%	36%	36%	+12
Lithuania	29%	39%	28%	+9
Luxembourg	81%	84%	73%	-1
Malta	68%	74%	65%	+7
Netherlands	95%	94%	91%	+2
Poland	41%	50%	38%	+5
Portugal	79%	81%	78%	+7
Romania	27%	25%	27%	-4
Slovakia	35%	37%	31%	+17
Slovenia	42%	62%	40%	+0
Spain	87%	88%	84%	+2
Sweden	94%	94%	91%	+2

=== Historical evolution ===
While earlier versions of the Eurobarometer already polled European Union citizens on their general attitude towards LGBTQ people, the first Eurobarometer to specifically ask questions on LGBTQ rights was the "Standard Eurobarometer 66" published in November 2006. Subsequent surveys on discrimination (2008-2012) focused on the perception of discrimination rather than support for specific rights.

In February 2014, the European Parliament adopted the Lunacek Report, which was a resolution calling for an EU roadmap against homophobia and discrimination on grounds of sexual orientation and gender identity. Following the start of the Juncker Commission the Directorate-General for Justice and Consumers commissioned the "Special Eurobarometer 437: Discrimination in the EU in 2015" that was published in October 2015. Using data from that Eurobarometer, in December 2015, the European Commission published its List of Actions to Advance LGBTI Equality (2015–2019) which was seen as a direct response to the Lunacek Report. Since 2015 EU-level polling on LGBTQ rights as such has continued regularly. The latest Special Eurobarometer on Discrimination in the EU was published in 2023 and the next one is expected for 2027.

Support for LGBTQ rights (EU average in %)
Year	Equal rights for lesbian, gay, and bisexual people compared to heterosexual people (marriage, adoption, parental rights)	Legalisation of same-sex marriages throughout Europe	Equal rights for transgender people compared to anyone else (marriage, adoption, parental rights)	Legal gender recognition for transgender people	Legal recognition of non-binary gender
2023	69%^{[a]}	72%	64%	62%	47%
2019	76%^{[b]}	69%	-	59%	46%
2015	71%^{[b]}	61%	-	63%	-
2006	(adoption only: 32%)^{[c]}	44%	-	-	-

== Notes ==
^a. In 2023 the question was altered slightly from previous years to specify "marriage, adoption, and parental rights" for the first time. In light of the increases in support for the other unaltered questions, the Eurobarometer study likely attributes the decrease in percentage points regarding "equal rights" from 2019 to 2023 to this wording change.
^b. In 2015 and 2019 the question only concerned equal rights and did not specify these rights any further.
^c. In 2006 the question did not ask about equal rights in general, but only whether the adoption of children by same-sex couples should be legalised throughout Europe.

== See also ==
- LGBTQ rights in Europe
- LGBTQ adoption in Europe
- Recognition of same-sex unions in Europe
- Article 8 of the European Convention on Human Rights
- European Union Fundamental Rights Agency
- LGBT-free zone
