= Jakub Cupriak-Trojan and Mateusz Trojan v Wojewoda Mazowiecki =

2025 European Court of Justice case

- European Court of Justice

Decided 25 November 2025
- Full case name: Jakub Cupriak-Trojan and Mateusz Trojan v Wojewoda Mazowiecki
- Case: C-713/23
- ECLI: ECLI:EU:C:2025:917
- Case type: Request for a preliminary ruling
- Chamber: Grand Chamber
- Nationality of parties: German, Polish
- Procedural history: Naczelny Sąd Administracyjny, request for a preliminary ruling pursuant to Article 267 TFEU, by decision of 8 November 2023

Court composition
- President; Koen Lenaerts
- Judge Rapporteur; Küllike Jürimäe
- Advocate General; Jean Richard de la Tour

Instruments cited
- Treaty on the Functioning of the European Union, Charter of Fundamental Rights of the European Union

Legislation affecting
- interpretation of Article 20(2)(a) and Article 21(1) TFEU, read in the light of Article 7 and Article 21(1) of the Charter of Fundamental Rights of the European Union (‘the Charter’), and of Article 2(2) of Directive 2004/38/EC of the European Parliament and of the Council of 29 April 2004 on the right of citizens of the Union and their family members to move and reside freely within the territory of the Member States amending Regulation (EEC) No 1612/68 and repealing Directives 64/221/EEC, 68/360/EEC, 72/194/EEC, 73/148/EEC, 75/34/EEC, 75/35/EEC, 90/364/EEC, 90/365/EEC and 93/96/EEC (OJ 2004 L 158, p. 77, and corrigendum OJ 2004 L 229, p. 35).

Jakub Cupriak-Trojan and Mateusz Trojan v Wojewoda Mazowiecki (2025) is a second (after Coman and Others v General Inspectorate for Immigration and Ministry of the Interior) landmark historic decision of the European Court of Justice, which ruled that a same-sex marriage performed in one member state of the European Union must be recognized in all member states of the European Union.

The Grand Chamber of the European Court of Justice (ECJ) found that both the Treaty on the Functioning of the European Union and the Charter of Fundamental Rights of the European Union guarantee the fundamental right of a same-sex couple who had their same-sex marriage performed in one member state of the European Union to have their same-sex marriage recognized in all member states of the European Union.

The ruling expands upon the 2018 ECJ case Coman and Others v General Inspectorate for Immigration and Ministry of the Interior (Coman and Others), which affirmed residency rights in EU countries to the spouse of an EU citizen who is exercising their right to freedom of movement and if the marriage was legally performed in an EU member state.

== EU law ==
Article 21 TFEU defines that "every citizen of the Union shall have the right to move and reside freely within the territory of the Member States."

Directive 2004/38/EC (the Citizens’ Rights Directive or Free Movement Directive) defines this right. It grants the same freedom to family members of Union citizens (including spouses), even if they are not nationals of an EU member state. "Family members" (Article 2(2)) include the spouse, the registered partner, a child under 21, or a dependent child or parent (of the Union citizen or partner). There is a second category of "any other family member", which can be included at the discretion of national legislation.

The Charter of Fundamental Rights of the European Union affirms the freedom of movement and of residence (Article 45) and furthermore guarantees the right to respect for private and family life (Article 7), guarantees the right to marry (Article 9) and prohibits discrimination based on, among other grounds, sex and sexual orientation (Article 21).

== Case background ==
Mateusz Trojan, a Polish citizen, had married a Polish-German citizen, Jakub Cupriak-Trojan, in 2018 in Germany, where same-sex marriage has been legal since 2017. The couple wished to relocate to Poland and file their marriage certificate with a local court, but were refused by the Head of the Warsaw Civil Registry Office due to the constitutional ban on same-sex marriage. The couple unsuccessfully challenged the refusal before the governor of Masovian Voivodeship, then in Provincial Administrative Court in Warsaw, arguing for recognition on the grounds of both countries being EU members. After appealing to the Supreme Administrative Court of Poland, the court referred the case to the ECJ to seek clarification on interpretation of Article 20(2)(a) and Article 21(1) TFEU, read in the light of Article 7 and Article 21(1) of the Charter. The judgment is based on the case Coman v General Inspectorate for Immigration of the Ministry of Internal Affairs [Romania], which was decided in 2018. Nevertheless, it also cites cases considered at the ECtHR:

- Andersen v. Poland (2025) concerning the registration of a foreign marriage certificate and the practical hardships of non-recognition (such as the necessity of seeking judicial protection for ordinary needs, existing in a legal limbo, and the forced adjustment of behaviour to secure alternative legal recognition) impacting a non-resident of Poland,
- Formela v. Poland (2024) regarding the state's obligation to ensure that the applicants have a specific legal framework providing for the recognition and protection of their unions,
- Przybyszewska and Others v. Poland (2023) regarding the recognition of civil partnerships in Poland, similar to Oliari v. Italy and Fedotova v. Russia, but concerning Poland.

== Preliminary questions ==
The question referred by the Supreme Administrative Court of Poland to the European Court of Justice on 23 November 2023 was:

‘Must the provisions of Article 20(2)(a) and Article 21(1) TFEU, read in conjunction with Article 7 and Article 21(1) of the [Charter] and Article 2(2) of Directive [2004/38,] be interpreted as precluding the competent authorities of a Member State, where a citizen of the Union who is a national of that State has contracted a marriage with another citizen of the Union (a person of the same sex) in a Member State in accordance with the legislation of that State, from refusing to recognise that marriage certificate and transcribe it into the national civil registry, which prevents those persons from residing in the State in question with the marital status of a married couple and under the same surname, on the grounds that the law of the host Member State does not provide for same-sex marriage?’

== Ruling ==
A hearing was held on 3 December 2024. The Advocate General Jean Richard de la Tour gave his formal opinion on 3 April 2025. The Court followed the opinion and ruled as follows in Grand Chamber on 25 November 2025:

Article 20 and Article 21(1) TFEU, read in the light of Article 7 and Article 21(1) of the Charter of Fundamental Rights of the European Union, must be interpreted as precluding legislation of a Member State which, on the ground that the law of that Member State does not allow marriage between persons of the same sex, does not permit the recognition of a marriage between two same-sex nationals of that Member State concluded lawfully in the exercise of their freedom to move and reside within another Member State, in which they have created or strengthened a family life, or the transcription for that purpose of the marriage certificate in the civil register of the first Member State, where that transcription is the only means provided for by that Member State for such recognition.

== Aftermath ==
The ruling requires Poland, Romania, Bulgaria and Slovakia, all of which are EU member states which maintain constitutional bans on same-sex marriage and do not maintain some form of civil partnership registry or same-sex couples, to recognize those same-sex marriages legally conducted in other member states. It does not require any member state to perform said marriages.

Additionally, it confirms that Member States which allow for same-sex couple to register under legal devices different from marriage (e.g. civil unions or civil partnerships) to register the marriage under that different legal device. One such example is Italy, where already before the ruling, same-sex marriages performed abroad by an Italian citizen and a non-Italian individual, get registered as same-sex civil unions (the only legal device open to Italian same-sex couple, marriage being reserved to opposite-sex couples), potentially providing fewer protections under law than marriage.

On 20 March 2026, the Supreme Administrative Court formally affirmed the ECJ ruling for Poland, ruling that same-sex marriages contracted in other member states must be recognized domestically for administrative and residency purposes. The decision ordered local civil registry offices to transcribe non-Polish EU same-sex marriage certificates into the Polish system. The Law and Justice Party announced an appeal of the verdict to the Constitutional Tribunal.

On 14 May 2026 the marriage certificate of Jakub Cupriak-Trojan and Mateusz Trojan was registered by the Head of the Civil Registry Office in Warsaw, thus becoming the first same-sex marriage certificate in Poland.

However, since Cupriak-Trojan was a preliminary ruling in a Polish case. It did not rewrite the civil registries or national laws of other EU Member States that ban or restrict same-sex marriage (such as Romania, Bulgaria, Slovakia, or Hungary). These countries continue to refuse same-sex marriage recognition. As an EU free-movement ruling grounded in the Treaty on the Functioning of the European Union, the decision has no legal force in non-EU countries.

== See also ==
- LGBTQ rights in the European Union
- Recognition of same-sex unions in Europe
- Recognition of same-sex unions in Poland
- Schalk and Kopf v Austria (2010 European Court of Human Rights case)
- Coman and Others v General Inspectorate for Immigration and Ministry of the Interior (2018 ECJ case)
- Obergefell v. Hodges (2015 United States Supreme Court case)
- Respect for Marriage Act (2022 United States law)
