= Bundesgesetzblatt =

Bundesgesetzblatt, abbreviated BGBl (Federal Law Gazette, Federal Gazette) may refer to:

- Bundesgesetzblatt (Germany)
- Bundesgesetzblatt (Austria)
- Bundesgesetzblatt des Norddeutschen Bundes (1867–1871), Federal Gazette of the North German Confederation
- Bundesgesetzblatt des Deutschen Bundes (1871), continuation of the Federal Gazette of the North German Confederation

== See also ==
- Federal Gazette (disambiguation)
