= Pavel Kristián of Koldín =

Czech jurist and public official

Pavel Kristián of Koldín (Czech: Pavel Kristián z Koldína, 1530 – 1589) was a Bohemian jurist and public official.

After studies in Prague, he became rector of the Latin school there. He was ennobled in 1557 and became a dean at Charles University in 1561. In 1563 he was appointed council clerk of the New City of Prague, and served as chancellor of the Old City from 1565 to 1584.

In Bohemian law, his legacy was the code of urban law of the Kingdom of Bohemia, which he drafted in 1569, and which was enacted in 1579. It also applied in Moravia after 1697 and remained in force until the introduction of the Austrian ABGB of 1811.
