= Coman and Others v General Inspectorate for Immigration and Ministry of the Interior =

2018 decision of the European Court of Justice

- European Court of Justice

Decided 5 June 2018
- Full case name: Coman and Others v Inspectoratul General pentru Imigrări and Ministerul Afacerilor Interne
- ECLI: ECLI:EU:C:2018:385
- Chamber: Full Court

Court composition
- President; Koen Lenaerts
- Judge Rapporteur; Marko Ilešič
- Advocate General; Melchior Wathelet

Coman and Others v Inspectoratul General pentru Imigrări and Ministerul Afacerilor Interne is a 2018 case of the European Court of Justice (ECJ) that affirmed residency rights in EU countries (that do not recognise same-sex unions), to the spouse of an EU citizen who is exercising their right to freedom of movement and if the marriage was legally performed in an EU member state.

As of November 2023, Romania has yet to implement the verdict by granting Coman's partner a residence permit. On 14 September 2021 the European Parliament passed a resolution calling on the European Commission to ensure that the ruling is respected across the EU. The case was expanded upon in the 2025 case Cupriak-Trojan and Trojan v Wojewoda Mazowiecki.

== EU law ==
Article 21 TFEU defines that "every citizen of the Union shall have the right to move and reside freely within the territory of the Member States."

Directive 2004/38/EC (the Citizens’ Rights Directive or Free Movement Directive) defines this right. It grants the same freedom to family members of Union citizens (including spouses), even if they are not nationals of an EU member state. "Family members" (Article 2(2)) include the spouse, the registered partner, a child under 21, or a dependent child or parent (of the Union citizen or partner). There is a second category of "any other family member", which can be included at the discretion of national legislation.

The Charter of Fundamental Rights of the European Union affirms the freedom of movement and of residence (Article 45) and furthermore guarantees the right to respect for private and family life (Article 7), guarantees the right to marry (Article 9) and prohibits discrimination based on, among other grounds, sex and sexual orientation (Article 21).

== Case background ==
In 2010, Adrian Coman, a Romanian national and thus EU citizen, married Claibourn Robert Hamilton, a citizen of the United States, in Belgium, an EU member state where same-sex marriage is legal. The Civil Code of Coman's home country Romania prohibits same-sex marriage and does not recognise same-sex marriages performed abroad. On these grounds, the Romanian immigration authorities denied a residence permit for his spouse when the couple wanted to move back after living in the United States. They challenged the decision before the Court of First Instance in Bucharest, which referred the case to the Constitutional Court of Romania, which in turn asked for a preliminary ruling from the European Court of Justice.

The European Commission and the Netherlands intervened on behalf of the applicants, while Latvia, Poland, and Hungary filed briefs supporting Romania's position. Advocate-General Melchior Wathelet issued a legal opinion supporting the applicants.

== Preliminary questions ==
The questions referred by the Constitutional Court of Romania to the European Court of Justice on 29 November 2016 were:

1. Does the term “spouse” in Article 2(2)(a) of Directive 2004/38, read in the light of Articles 7, 9, 21 and 45 of the Charter, include the same-sex spouse, from a State which is not a Member State of the European Union, of a citizen of the European Union to whom that citizen is lawfully married in accordance with the law of a Member State other than the host Member State?

2. If the answer [to the first question] is in the affirmative, do Articles 3(1) and 7([2]) of Directive 2004/38, read in the light of Articles 7, 9, 21 and 45 of the Charter, require the host Member State to grant the right of residence in its territory for a period of longer than three months to the same-sex spouse of a citizen of the European Union?

3. If the answer to [the first question] is in the negative, can the same-sex spouse, from a State which is not a Member State of the Union, of the Union citizen to whom he or she is lawfully married, in accordance with the law of a Member State other than the host State, be classified as “any other family member” within the meaning of Article 3(2)(a) of Directive 2004/38 or a “partner with whom the Union citizen has a durable relationship, duly attested”, within the meaning of Article 3(2)(b) of that directive, with the corresponding obligation for the host Member State to facilitate entry and residence for that spouse, even if that State does not recognise marriages between persons of the same sex and provides no alternative form of legal recognition, such as registered partnership?

4. If the answer to [the third question] is in the affirmative, do Articles 3(2) and 7(2) of Directive 2004/38, read in the light of Articles 7, 9, 21 and 45 of the Charter, require the host Member State to grant the right of residence in its territory for a period of longer than three months to the same-sex spouse of a Union citizen?’

== Ruling ==
A hearing was held on 21 November 2017. The Advocate General Melchior Wathelet delivered his opinion on 11 January 2018. The Court followed the opinion and ruled as follows in Grand Chamber on 5 June 2018:

1. In a situation in which a Union citizen has made use of his freedom of movement by moving to and taking up genuine residence, in accordance with the conditions laid down in Article 7(1) of Directive 2004/38/EC [...], in a Member State other than that of which he is a national, and, whilst there, has created and strengthened a family life with a third-country national of the same sex to whom he is joined by a marriage lawfully concluded in the host Member State, Article 21(1) TFEU must be interpreted as precluding the competent authorities of the Member State of which the Union citizen is a national from refusing to grant that third-country national a right of residence in the territory of that Member State on the ground that the law of that Member State does not recognise marriage between persons of the same sex.
2. Article 21(1) TFEU is to be interpreted as meaning that, in circumstances such as those of the main proceedings, a third-country national of the same sex as a Union citizen whose marriage to that citizen was concluded in a Member State in accordance with the law of that state has the right to reside in the territory of the Member State of which the Union citizen is a national for more than three months. That derived right of residence cannot be made subject to stricter conditions than those laid down in Article 7 of Directive 2004/38.

== Reception ==
According to law professors Dimitry Kochenov and Uladzislau Belavusau, the ruling against Romania was anticipated by legal experts, as "The outcome was mandated by the language of the relevant legal provisions since their inception". Kochenov and Belavusau also state that "Coman is among the best-founded decisions of the Court in its history from the viewpoints of legal certainty and the articulation of the letter and the spirit of the law." They note that, in light of European Court of Human Rights rulings in Oliari and Others v. Italy (in which Italy was required to provide some form of legal recognition to same-sex couples) and Pajić v. Croatia (in which Croatia was required to grant residency rights to a Bosnian citizen in a same-sex relationship with a Croatian citizen), "if only Romania was a state compliant with ECHR law, no recourse to EU law would be necessary at all in this case".

== See also ==
- LGBT rights in the European Union
- Recognition of same-sex unions in Europe
- Schalk and Kopf v Austria (2010 European Court of Human Rights case)
- Obergefell v. Hodges (2015 United States Supreme Court case)
