= Schalk and Kopf v Austria =

Schalk and Kopf v Austria (Application no. 30141/04) is a case decided in 2010 by the European Court of Human Rights (ECtHR) in which it was clarified that the European Convention on Human Rights (ECHR) does not oblige member states to legislate for or legally recognize same-sex marriages.

== Facts ==
The applicants are a same-sex couple living in Vienna, Austria. On 10 September 2002 they requested the Office for matters of Personal Status (Standesamt) to proceed with the formalities to enable them to contract marriage. By decision of 20 December 2002 the Vienna Municipal Office (Magistrat) refused the applicants’ request. Referring to Article 44 of the Civil Code (Allgemeines Bürgerliches Gesetzbuch), it held that marriage could only be contracted between two persons of opposite sex. According to constant case-law, a marriage concluded by two persons of the same sex was null and void. Since the applicants were two men, they lacked the capacity for contracting marriage. The applicants then lodged an appeal with the Vienna Regional Governor (Landeshauptmann), which was also dismissed. In his decision of 11 April 2003, the Governor confirmed the Municipal Office’s legal view. In addition he referred to the Administrative Court’s (Verwaltungsgerichtshof) case-law according to which it constituted an impediment to marriage if the two persons concerned were of the same sex.

The ultimate and final remedy for the applicants was a complaint to the Constitutional Court (Verfassungsgerichtshof). In this complaint the applicants alleged that the legal impossibility for them to get married constituted a violation of their constitutional right to respect for private and family life and of the principle of non-discrimination. (Austria treats the ECHR as part of its own constitutional law. The legal provisions referred to by the applicants were thus those set out in Articles 12, 8 and 14 of the Convention). They argued that the notion of marriage had evolved since the entry into force of the Civil Code in 1812. In particular, the procreation and education of children no longer formed an integral part of marriage. In present-day perception, marriage was rather a permanent union encompassing all aspects of life. There was no objective justification for excluding same-sex couples from entering into marriage, all the more so since the European Court of Human Rights had acknowledged that differences based on sexual orientation required particularly weighty reasons. Other European countries either allowed same-sex marriages or had otherwise amended their legislation in order to give equal status to same-sex partnerships.

On 12 December 2003 the Constitutional Court dismissed the applicants’ complaint. The relevant parts of its judgment read as follows: “Neither the principle of equality set forth in the Austrian Federal Constitution nor the European Convention on Human Rights (as evidenced by “men and women” in Article 12) require that the concept of marriage as being geared to the fundamental possibility of parenthood should be extended to relationships of a different kind. (...) "The fact that same-sex relationships fall within the concept of private life and as such enjoy the protection of Article 8 of the ECHR – which also prohibits discrimination on non-objective grounds (Article 14 of the ECHR) – does not give rise to an obligation to change the law of marriage. "It is unnecessary in the instant case to examine whether, and in which areas, the law unjustifiably discriminates against same-sex relationships by providing for special rules for married couples. Nor is it the task of this court to advise the legislature on constitutional issues or even matters of legal policy." "Instead, the complaint must be dismissed as ill-founded.”

== Judgment ==
=== No violation of Article 12 of the Convention ===
The applicants claimed that Austria's failure to legally recognise same-sex marriages constituted a violation of Article 12 ECHR, which provides as follows:

“Men and women of marriageable age have the right to marry and to found a family, according to the national laws governing the exercise of this right.”

The Court unanimously dismissed this claim:

"The Court notes that Article 12 grants the right to marry to “men and women”. The French version provides « l’homme et la femme ont le droit de se marier ». Furthermore, Article 12 grants the right to found a family. The applicants argued that the wording did not necessarily imply that a man could only marry a woman and vice versa. The Court observes that, looked at in isolation, the wording of Article 12 might be interpreted so as not to exclude the marriage between two men or two women. However, in contrast, all other substantive Articles of the Convention grant rights and freedoms to “everyone” or state that “no one” is to be subjected to certain types of prohibited treatment. The choice of wording in Article 12 must thus be regarded as deliberate. Moreover, regard must be had to the historical context in which the Convention was adopted. In the 1950s marriage was clearly understood in the traditional sense of being a union between partners of different sex."

=== No violation of Article 14 in conjunction with Article 8 of the Convention ===
As a subsidiary argument, the applicants complained under Article 14 taken in conjunction with Article 8 of the Convention that they had been discriminated against on account of their sexual orientation, since they were denied the right to marry.

Addressing this part of the complaint, the ECHR pointed out the following:

"Insofar as the applicants appear to contend that, if not included in Article 12, the right to marry might be derived from Article 14 taken in conjunction with Article 8, the Court is unable to share their view. It reiterates that the Convention is to be read as a whole and its Articles should therefore be construed in harmony with one another. Having regard to the conclusion reached above, namely that Article 12 does not impose an obligation on Contracting States to grant same-sex couples access to marriage, Article 14 taken in conjunction with Article 8, a provision of more general purpose and scope, cannot be interpreted as imposing such an obligation either."

The applicants also saw these articles as violated by lack of legal recognition of same-sex couples in Austria before 2010. The Court responded:

The Court cannot but note that there is an emerging European consensus towards legal recognition of same-sex couples. Moreover, this tendency has developed rapidly over the past decade. Nevertheless, there is not yet a majority of States providing for legal recognition of same-sex couples. The area in question must therefore still be regarded as one of evolving rights with no established consensus, where States must also enjoy a margin of appreciation in the timing of the introduction of legislative changes (..) The Austrian Registered Partnership Act, which entered into force on 1 January 2010, reflects the evolution described above and is thus part of the emerging European consensus. Though not in the vanguard, the Austrian legislator cannot be reproached for not having introduced the Registered Partnership Act any earlier

Judges Rozakis, Spielmann and Tulkens dissented in this respect, stating:

Having identified a “relevantly similar situation” (para. 99), and emphasised that “differences based on sexual orientation require particularly serious reasons by way of justification” (para. 97), the Court should have found a violation of Article 14 taken in conjunction with Article 8 of the Convention because the respondent Government did not advance any argument to justify the difference of treatment, relying in this connection mainly on their margin of appreciation (para. 80). However, in the absence of any cogent reasons offered by the respondent Government to justify the difference of treatment, there should be no room to apply the margin of appreciation. Consequently, the “existence or non-existence of common ground between the laws of the Contracting States” (para. 98) is irrelevant as such considerations are only a subordinate basis for the application of the concept of the margin of appreciation. Indeed, it is only in the event that the national authorities offer grounds for justification that the Court can be satisfied, taking into account the presence or the absence of a common approach, that they are better placed than it is to deal effectively with the matter

=== Obiter dictum on same-sex relations to be considered a form of "family life" ===
The Court, for the first time, has accepted same-sex relationships as a form of "family life". The statement runs as follows:

"...the Court’s case-law has only accepted that the emotional and sexual relationship of a same-sex couple constitutes “private life” but has not found that it constitutes “family life”, even where a long term relationship of cohabiting partners was at stake. In coming to that conclusion, the Court observed that despite the growing tendency in a number of European States towards the legal and judicial recognition of stable de facto partnerships between gay people, given the existence of

little common ground between the Contracting States, this was an area in which they still enjoyed a wide margin of appreciation. (...) The Court notes that (...) a rapid evolution of social attitudes towards same-sex couples has taken place in many member States. Since then a considerable number of member States have afforded legal recognition to same-sex couples (see above, paragraphs 27-30). Certain provisions of EU law also reflect a growing tendency to include same-sex couples in the notion of “family”(...).

In view of this evolution the Court considers it artificial to maintain the view that, in contrast to a different-sex couple, a same-sex couple cannot enjoy “family life” for the purposes of Article 8. Consequently the relationship of the applicants, a cohabiting same-sex couple living in a stable de facto partnership, falls within the notion of “family life”, just as the relationship of a different-sex couple in the same situation would."

However, this constitutes a mere obiter dictum that had no impact on the outcome of the case.

=== Obiter dictum on the scope of Article 12 in light of the EU Charter of Fundamental Rights ===
Another obiter dictum of the Court concerns Article 9 of the EU Fundamental Rights Charter:

Regard being had to Article 9 of the Charter, therefore, the Court would no longer consider that the right to marry enshrined in Article 12 must in all circumstances be limited to marriage between two persons of the opposite sex. Consequently, it cannot be said that Article 12 is inapplicable to the applicants' complaint

Judge Malinverni in his concurrence has objected to this obiter dictum:

Article 12 is inapplicable to persons of the same sex. Admittedly, in guaranteeing the right to marry, Article 8 of the Charter of Fundamental Rights of the European Union deliberately omitted any reference to men and women, since it provides that “the right to marry and to found a family shall be guaranteed in accordance with the national laws governing the exercise of these rights”. In my opinion, however, no inferences can be drawn from this as regards the interpretation of Article 12 of our Convention. The commentary on the Charter does indeed confirm that the drafters of Article 8 intended it to be broader in scope than the corresponding articles in other international treaties. However, it should not be forgotten that Article 8 of the Charter guarantees the right to marry and to found a family “in accordance with the national laws governing the exercise of these rights”.

By referring in this way to the relevant domestic legislation, Article 8 of the Charter simply leaves it to States to decide whether they wish to afford homosexual couples the right to marry. However, as the commentary quite rightly points out, “there is no obstacle to recognize same-sex relationships in the context of marriage. There is, however, no explicit requirement that domestic laws should facilitate such marriages.” In my view, Article 8 of the Charter should therefore have no bearing on the interpretation of Article 12 of the Convention as conferring a right to marry only on persons of different sexes

=== Separate opinions ===
Judges Rozakis, Jebens and Spielmann submitted a joint dissenting opinion, arguing that lack of legal recognition of same-sex couples in Austria before 2010 constituted violation of Article 14 in conjunction with Article 8.

Judge Malinverni, joined by judge Kovler, submitted a concurring opinion, arguing that Article 12 could under no circumstances be construed as referring to same-sex couples.

=== Request for referral to Grand Chamber ===
A request of the unsuccessful applicants to refer the case to a Grand Chamber was rejected by the Court.

== See also ==
- Recognition of same-sex unions in Europe
- Recognition of same-sex unions in Austria
