= Federal Gazette =

Federal Gazette may refer to:

- Bundesgesetzblatt (disambiguation), Federal Law Gazette, Germany and Austria
- Federal Gazette (Switzerland) / Bundesblatt / Feuille fédérale / Foglio federale of Switzerland
- Initial name of the Philadelphia Gazette
- Pennsylvania Federal Gazette
- Federal Gazette (Baltimore)
- Official Gazette of the Union, Brazil
