= Bernhard Themessl =

Austrian politician (born 1951)

Member of the National Council
- Incumbent
- Assumed office 30 October 2006
- Constituency: 8 Vorarlberg

Personal details
- Born: 15 October 1951 (age 74)
- Party: Freedom Party of Austria

Bernhard Themessl (born 15 October 1951) is an Austrian politician who has been a Member of the National Council for the Freedom Party of Austria (FPÖ) since 2006.
