= Silvia Grünberger =

Austrian politician (born 1981)

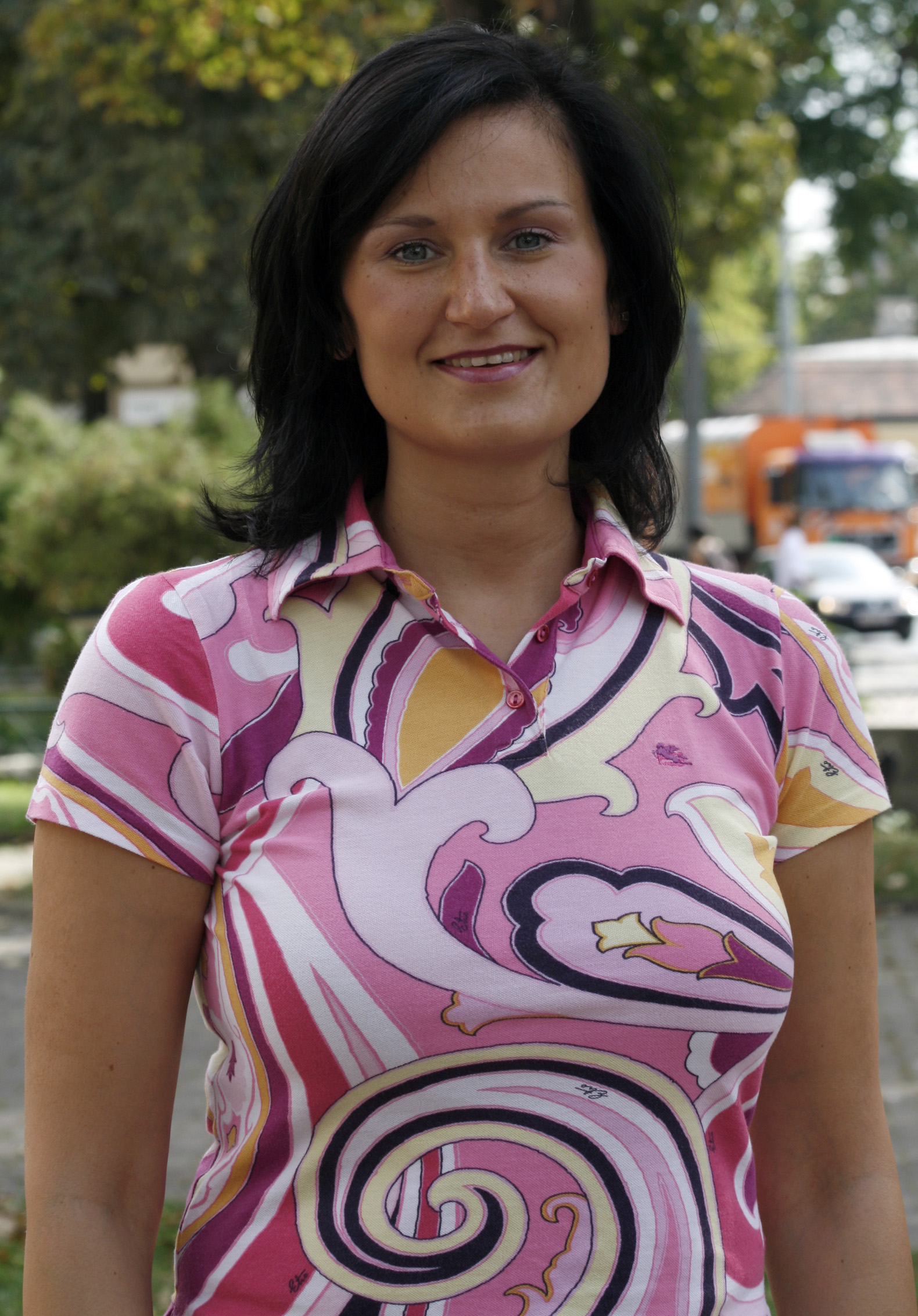
- Portrait of Silvia Grünberger
- Born: Silvia Fuhrmann; 3 July 1981 (age 44); Eisenstadt, Burgenland, Austria
- Political party: People's Party

Silvia Grünberger (born 3 July 1981) is a former Austrian politician. She was a member of the National Council from 2002 to 2013.
