= Second-parent adoption =

Type of adoption used by a stepparent

The second-parent adoption or co-parent adoption is a process by which a partner, who is not biologically related to the child, can adopt their partner's biological or adoptive child without terminating the first legal parent's rights. This process is of interest to many couples, as legal parenthood allows the parent's partner to do things such as: make medical decisions, claim dependency, or gain custody in the event of the death of the biological parent.

Second-parent adoption is relevant in the context of LGBTQ+ adoption. In the United States, second-parent adoption was started by the National Center for Lesbian Rights (formerly the Lesbian Rights Project) in the mid-1980s. The NCLR offers a legal guide that covers the basics of second-parent adoption. According to the NCLR, second parent adoption is the most common means by which LGBTQ+ non-biological parents establish a legal relationship with their child.

Family law varies from state to state in America. Courts in many states have granted second-parent adoptions to same-sex couples, though there is no statewide law or court decision that guarantees this. In fact, courts within the same state but in different jurisdictions often contradict each other in practice. According to the NCLR, it is legally advisable for LGBTQ+ parents to get an adoption or parentage judgment to ensure that their parental rights are fully protected in every state.

The American Medical Association (AMA) supported second parent adoption by same-sex partners, stating that lack of formal recognition can cause health-care disparities for children of same-sex parents. The American Academy of Pediatrics also supports second parent adoption. The American Academy of Child and Adolescent Psychiatry says they oppose all discrimination based on sexual orientation or gender identity regarding custodial, foster, or adoptive rights. The American Bar Association supports second parent adoptions by unmarried persons, saying it is in the best interest of the child.

Countries other than America similarly support second-parent adoption. In July 2011, The Ministry of Labour, Family and Social Affairs of Slovenia stated that the existing law allows for second-parent adoption. In the context of LGBTQ+ adoption and parenting in Australia, As of 2008, the best option was to apply to the Family Court of Australia for a parenting order, as ‘other people significant to the care, welfare and development’ of the child. It provides an important "status quo" if the birth mother were to die, preventing other family members from taking immediate custody of the child.

An adoption home study must be completed for any second-parent wanting to adopt. The adoption home study process ensures that the child is placed in a home that will best suit their needs. This process is dependent upon the state in which the adoption will take place.

== United States ==
If second-parent adoption is not a legal option in certain counties or states, the Human Rights Campaign suggests taking precautionary steps, such as: a written custody agreement or a co-parent agreement between partners. Also suggested is gathering evidence to prove you are a family.

Note that where second parent adoption is illegal, it is illegal for both different sex and same-sex couples.

Legal status of adoption by same-sex couples around the world: Joint adoption allowed Second-parent adoption allowed No laws allowing adoption by same-sex couples and no same-sex marriage Same-sex marriage but adoption by married same-sex couples not allowed

U.S. States	Is second-parent adoption legal for married couples?	Is second-parent adoption legal for unmarried and/or domestic partners (whether same-sex or opposite-sex)?	Are same-sex couples explicitly granted the right to second-parent adoption?
Alabama	Yes	No	Yes (in certain counties)
Alaska	Yes	Yes	No
Arizona	Yes	Yes	No
Arkansas	Yes	Yes	No
California	Yes	Yes	Yes
Colorado	Yes	Yes	Yes
Connecticut	Yes	Yes	Yes
Delaware	Yes	Yes	Yes (in certain counties)
District of Columbia	Yes	Yes	Yes
Florida	Yes	Yes	Yes (in certain counties)
Georgia	Yes	Yes	Yes (in certain counties)
Hawaii	Yes	Yes	Yes (in certain counties)
Idaho	Yes	Yes	Yes
Illinois	Yes	Yes	Yes
Indiana	Yes	Yes	Yes
Iowa	Yes	Yes	Yes (in certain counties)
Kansas	Yes	No	No
Kentucky	Yes	No	No
Louisiana	Yes	Yes	Yes (in certain counties)
Maine	Yes	Yes	Yes
Maryland	Yes	Yes	Yes (in certain counties)
Massachusetts	Yes	Yes	Yes
Michigan	Yes	Yes	No
Minnesota	Yes	Yes	Yes (in certain counties)
Mississippi	Yes	Yes	No
Missouri	Yes	Yes	No
Montana	Yes	Yes	No
Nebraska	Yes	Yes	Yes
Nevada	Yes	Yes	No
New Hampshire	Yes	Yes	No
New Jersey	Yes	Yes	Yes
New Mexico	Yes	Yes	No
New York	Yes	Yes	Yes
North Carolina	Yes	No	No
North Dakota	Yes	Yes	No
Ohio	Yes	No	No
Oklahoma	Yes	Yes	Yes
Oregon	Yes	Yes	Yes (in certain counties)
Pennsylvania	Yes	Yes	Yes
Rhode Island	Yes	Yes	Yes (in certain counties)
South Carolina	Yes	Yes	No
South Dakota	Yes	Yes	No
Tennessee	Yes	Yes	No
Texas	Yes	Yes	Yes (in certain counties)
Utah	Yes	No	No
Vermont	Yes	Yes	Yes
Virginia	Yes	Yes	Yes
Washington	Yes	Yes	Yes (in certain counties)
West Virginia	Yes	Yes	Yes (in certain counties)
Wisconsin	Yes	No	No
Wyoming	Yes	Yes	No

=== States that allow second-parent adoption ===
==== California ====
In 2014, California enacted the Modern Family Act. Assembly Bill 2344 became Section 9000.5 of the Family Code. It speeds up the second-parent adoption process for couples that include the child's birth mother or parent who used a gestational surrogate.

==== Nebraska ====
In Nebraska, any single adult, stepparent, or married couple may adopt.

In a 2002 court case, In re Adoption of Luke, 263 Neb. 365, the Supreme Court of Nebraska ruled that a biological parent's unmarried partner could not adopt their child in a second parent adoption.

In 2021, an unmarried lesbian couple sued Nebraska's health department for not allowing both of them to be on their son's birth certificate. The Nebraska Department of Health and Human Services denied their request. They stated that the only routes to legal parenthood are marriage, adoption, or biological relationship. According to the lawsuit, Nebraska case law prohibits second-parent adoption by an unmarried non-birth parent.

As of 2024, Nebraska law says that "any minor child may be adopted by any adult person or persons", though it references In re Adoption of Luke. A bill introduced in January 2025 proposes amending the law to require the original parent to give consent that states specifically that they, as sole legal parent, want "the child or adult child to be adopted by a second adult person."

=== States with restrictions ===
==== Alabama ====
The Family Equality Council wrote in 2016 that second parent adoptions were unavailable in Alabama.

Nonetheless, in 2016, in V.L. vs E.L., the U.S. Supreme Court ruled that the Full Faith and Credit Clause of the Constitution requires the Alabama state courts to recognize a Georgia state court’s adoption order. This followed an attempt by the Alabama Supreme Court to overturn a second parent same-sex adoption that had been validly granted by Georgia.

Stepparent adoption is legal in Alabama. "[T]he first requirement to be met", said a 2022 article published by the Alabama State Bar, "is that the petitioning parties be 'husband and wife.' The adoption code makes no exception for couples living together who are not married." The law was updated in 2023 to use the phrasing "an unmarried couple may not adopt a minor" but kept the requirement of marriage. Additionally, some courts have turned down requests to adopt a same-sex spouse’s child.

==== Kansas ====
The law says: "Any adult, or married adult couple jointly, may adopt any minor or adult as their child."

==== North Carolina ====
In North Carolina, married couples can jointly adopt if they've been married at least six months. A biological parent's spouse can adopt their child if the other biological parent waives their parental rights. This is called a stepparent adoption.

Individuals can adopt as well.

However, unmarried couples cannot adopt together. Second parent adoption is illegal.

==== Utah ====
To adopt in Utah, one must either be married and have permission from their spouse (i.e., stepparent adoption) or single and not living with another person. Anyone cohabitating in a non-marital sexual relationship cannot adopt in Utah. The adoptee must also be 10 years younger than the adopter. While there is no law specifically permitting unmarried couples to adopt (i.e., second parent adoption), Equality Utah says it is possible to obtain these adoptions.

== See also ==
- Stepparent adoption
- X and Others v Austria
- LGBT adoption
- Adoption home study
