= Bundesgesetzblatt für die Republik Österreich =

Government gazette of Austria

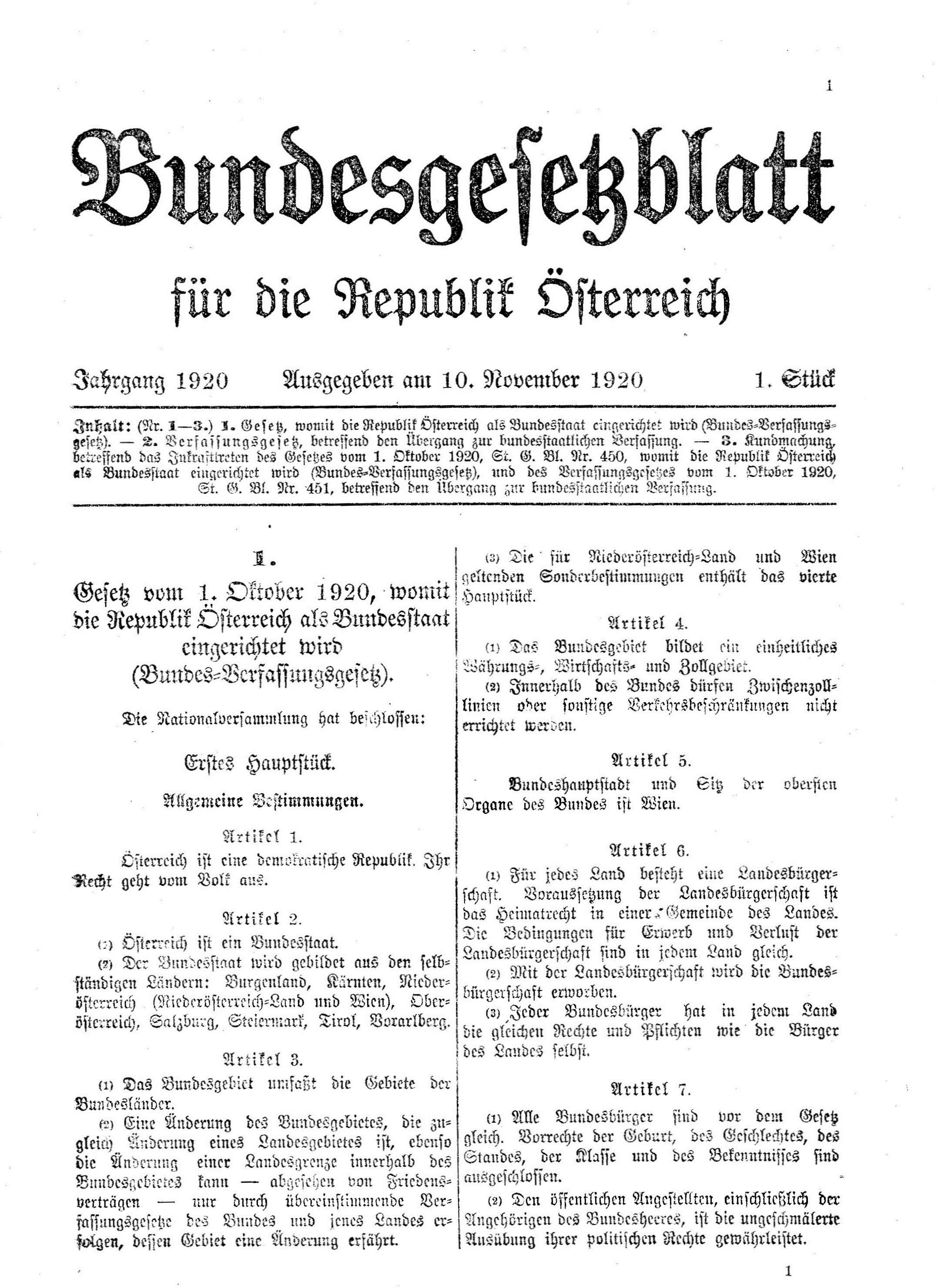
Bundesgesetzblatt für die Republik Österreich - 10 November 1920 Nr. 1

The Bundesgesetzblatt für die Republik Österreich (BGBl.) (Federal Law Gazette for the Republic of Austria) is an official gazette in Austria for the announcement of federal laws, ministerial decrees, proclamations and pronouncements of the Chancellor, resolutions of the President as well as international treaties and other supranational law.

Between 1934 and 1938, the publication was known as the Bundesgesetzblatt für den Bundesstaat Österreich. After the Anschluss, Austria ceased to exist as a sovereign entity, and the Gesetzblatt für das Land Österreich was published until 31 March 1940.

== Predecessors ==
Prior to the gazette of the modern Austrian state:

- Reichsgesetzblatt (1848–1918)
  - Allgemeines Reichs-Gesetz- und Regierungsblatt für das Kaiserthum Österreich (1848–1852)
  - Reichs-Gesetz-Blatt für das Kaiserthum Österreich (1853–1869)
  - Reichsgesetzblatt für die im Reichsrathe vertretenen Königreiche und Länder (1870–1918)
- Staatsgesetzblatt für den Staat Deutschösterreich (1918–1919)
- Staatsgesetzblatt für die Republik Österreich (1919–1920)
