= Anatoly Kovler =

Tajik-Russian legal scholar (born 1948)

Anatoly Ivanovich Kovler
- Анатолий Иванович Ковлер

Judge of the European Court of Human Rights in respect of Russia
- In office 21 September 1999 – 31 October 2012
- Preceded by: Vladimir Tumanov
- Succeeded by: Dmitry Dedov

Personal details
- Born: 26 August 1948 (age 78) Sari-Khassar, Tajik SSR, Soviet Union
- Education: Moscow State Institute of International Relations, Russian Academy of Sciences
- Profession: Jurist
- Awards: Order of Friendship; Honoured Lawyer of Russia

Anatoly Ivanovich Kovler (Russian: Анатолий Иванович Ковлер, born 26 August 1948) is a Tajikistani-born Soviet and Russian jurist and legal scholar who has served as judge of the European Court of Human Rights in respect of Russia. His term expired on 31 October 2012.

== Early life and education ==
Kovler was born in Sari-Khassar, Tajikistan, then part of the Soviet Union. In 1966, he began studying at the Moscow State Institute of Foreign Relations (MGIMO), the diplomatic school of the Ministry of Foreign Affairs of the Soviet Union, and graduated in 1971. He completed postgraduate studies at the Institute of the International Workers' Movement at the Academy of Sciences of the Soviet Union. In 1978, he defended his Candidate of Sciences (Ph.D. equivalent) thesis titled "Bourgeois Parties of the Fifth Republic and the Working-Class Electorate in France, 1958–1978: Methods of Influence by French Bourgeois Parties on the Working-Class Electorate".

== Career ==
From 1979, Kovler worked at the Comparative Law Center of the Institute of State and Law of the Academy of Sciences of the Soviet Union and later the Russian Academy of Sciences, being promoted in 1985 to professor of law and awarded the title of doctor of law in 1991. Between 1988 and 1992, he taught at the Faculty of Sociology at the Moscow State University and MGIMO, and from 1992 to 1995 at the Presidential Academy of Public Administration. In 1991, he defended his Doctor of Sciences (habilitation) thesis titled "Historical Forms of Democracy: Issues of Political and Legal Theory".

From 1991 to 1993, he served as an expert for the Russian Constitutional Court, contributing to the drafting of the 1993 Constitution of Russia, as well as legislative projects on political parties and electoral law. In 1994, he was awarded the title of Honoured Lawyer of Russia.

In 1999, he was elected by the Parliamentary Assembly of the Council of Europe to succeed Vladimir Tumanov as the judge of the European Court of Human Rights in respect of Russia. He was vice-president of its first section. His term at the court expired on 31 October 2012.

After leaving the ECtHR in 2013, he became an advisor to the Constitutional Court of Russia, holding the rank of State Counselor of Justice, 1st Class, and joined the Judiciary Department at the Higher School of Economics, chairing the department until 2018. He teaches courses on International Justice, Issues in Judicial Application of Law, and Rule of Law and Uniformity in Judicial Practice, while supervising postgraduate research.

From 2013 to 2018, Kovler taught constitutional law at the Faculty of Law at Moscow State University, delivering a specialized course on the European Court of Human Rights. Since 2016, he has worked at the Institute of Legislation and Comparative Law under the Government of Russia as head of the Center for International Law and Comparative Legal Studies.

In May 2016, Kovler was appointed by President Vladimir Putin as the second (alternate) member of the Venice Commission of the Council of Europe on behalf of Russia (the primary member being Taliya Habrieva). Russia's membership in the Venice Commission was terminated in March 2022.

In December 2018, he was appointed to the Presidential Council for Civil Society and Human Rights.

In July 2023, he was elected by the Federation Council as a member of the Russia's High Qualification Board of Judges.

== See also ==
- European Court of Human Rights
- List of judges of the European Court of Human Rights
