= Allgemeines bürgerliches Gesetzbuch =

Civil code of Austria

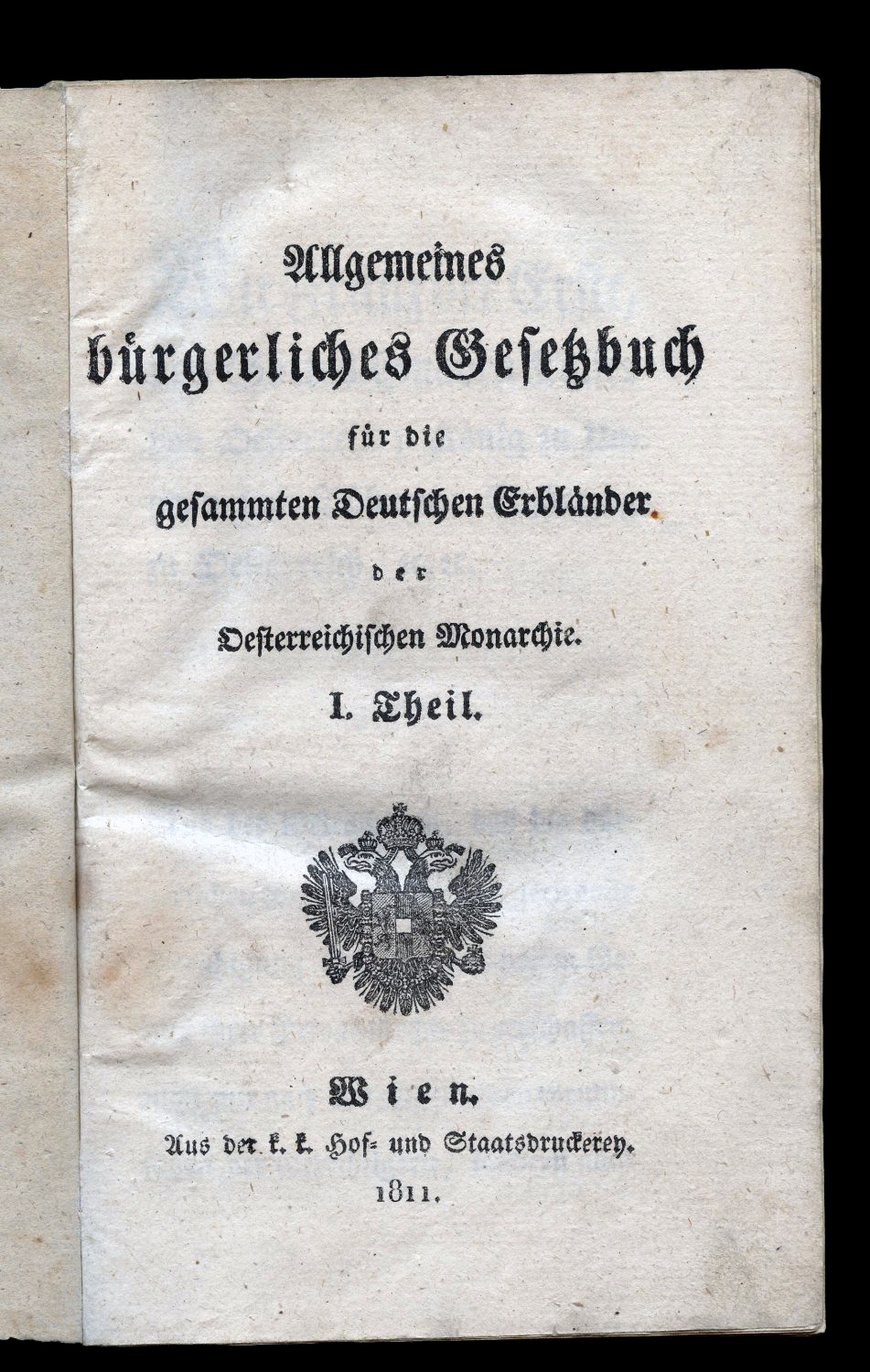
Title page of volume 1 of the ABGB from 1811

The General civil code (German: Allgemeines bürgerliches Gesetzbuch or ABGB) is the Civil Code of Austria, which after about 40 years of preparatory work was published on 1 June 1811 and came into force on 1 January 1812. Karl Anton Freiherr von Martini and Franz von Zeiller were the leading drafters at the earlier and later stages of the draft. Comparable to the Napoleonic Code, it was based on the ideals of freedom and equality before the law. It was divided into three major segments, following the Roman law segregation methods. It was modernized during the First World War. ABGB continues to be the basic civil code of Austria to this day and it is also still the basic civil code of Liechtenstein. The ABGB was widely received. Besides Austria, its influence persists in other successor states of Austria-Hungary. In the Czech part of Czechoslovakia (the Slovak part used Hungarian customary law) it was in effect until 1951, although it had been novelized multiple times, until it was replaced by the civil code from 1950. Despite the fact that some parts were in effect until 1964, the civil code had never been translated and published in Czech. The new Czech civil code (2012) took its inspiration from the ABGB again. In southern Poland it was partially in effect until the end of 1946. In Bosnia and Herzegovina, it was partially introduced after 1878, and some parts are still in use, even after this country's independence.
