= Recognition of same-sex unions in Myanmar =

Myanmar does not recognise same-sex marriage or civil unions. Burmese law recognises different family laws for its four main religions, Buddhism, Christianity, Islam and Hinduism, none of which permit same-sex unions.

== Legal history ==
=== Background ===
On 18 November 2013, a man and a transgender woman were married in Mawlamyine, drawing "harsh criticism and threats in the local community and from authorities". In March 2014, a same-sex couple, Myo Min Htet and Tin Ko Ko, held a wedding ceremony in Yangon in traditional Burmese clothing after having lived together for 10 years. The marriage was performed in front of 200 friends and family members, but lacks legal recognition in Myanmar. The Diplomat called the ceremony "a huge victory for the country's LGBT community, considering the climate of harassment and oppression of marginalized groups under the former military junta". It triggered backlash from social conservatives, who queried why the anti-homosexuality laws had not been enforced against the couple. Indeed, same-sex sexual relations are outlawed in Myanmar under a colonial-era law introduced during the time of the British Raj. In May 2024, a lesbian couple were married at a pride parade in Chiang Mai in Thailand. "This is an opportunity we cannot get in our country," said the couple, who cited Myanmar's laws and the "frequent abuse, discrimination and imprisonment" under the military junta that came to power after the 2021 coup d'état as their reasons for fleeing Myanmar.

=== Restrictions ===
Laws regarding homosexuality in Asia Same-sex sexual activity legal Marriage performed Marriage recognized Other type of partnership Unregistered cohabitation No recognition of same-sex couples Restricted or ambiguous Restriction on freedom of expression, not enforced Severe restriction of association with arrests or detention Same-sex sexual activity illegal Prison, not enforced Prison Death penalty on books, not enforced Enforced death penalty

Similarly to India, Myanmar has different family laws according to the religion or community of the spouses, originating due to Myanmar's former status as part of the British Raj. The Myanmar Customary Law (Burmese: မြန်မာ့ဓလေ့ထုံးတမ်းဥပဒေ, Myanmar Dhalaehtonetam Upaday) is the law that applies to all Buddhists. It mainly concerns family matters such as marriage, divorce, matrimonial rights and inheritance. The Myanmar Customary Law is not a written, enacted law, but rather has been developed by the courts, individual pieces of legislation (such as the Buddhist Women's Special Marriage Law), and some principles of Dhammathats, general principles in accordance with modern customs and habits of Buddhists. Customary law requires that in order to form a valid Buddhist marriage: the man must have attained puberty; the woman must be above twenty years of age, except if a widow, a divorcée, or has obtained her parents' or guardians' consent; the spouses must give their mutual and free consent to become husband and wife; the spouses parties must be mentally competent; the woman should not already be married; and if there is no marriage ceremony, the couple must openly live together as husband and wife.

Family laws for Myanmar's three other officially recognised religions, Christianity, Islam and Hinduism, do not recognise same-sex marriages. These personal laws largely consist of case law, although there are some pieces of legislation which have been passed by the various parliaments of Myanmar, based on similar laws passed in British India during the colonial period. The Christian Marriage Act, 1872 states that a Christian marriage may be solemnised "by any person who has received episcopal ordination, provided that the marriage be solemnized according to the rules, rites, ceremonies and customs of the Church of which he is a Minister", and requires that "the age of the man intending to be married shall exceed sixteen years, and the age of the woman intending to be married shall exceed thirteen years". Islamic family law consists of court precedents, requiring that "every Muslim of sound mind and having reached the age of majority may enter into a contract of marriage, in the presence of the witnesses." A Muslim woman who is under 18 years of age and not less than 16 years of age may enter into a contract of marriage with the agreement of her legal guardians.

The Special Marriage Act, 1872 (အထူးထိမ်းမြားခြင်းဆိုင်ရာအက်ဥပဒေ ၁၈၇၂, Aahtuu Htaimmyarrhkyinn Sineraraaatupaday 1872) provides for marriages "between persons neither of whom professes the Christian or the Jewish, or the Hindu or the Muhammadan, or the Parsi or the Buddhist, or the Sikh or the Jaina religion or between persons each of whom professes one or other of the following religions, that is to say, the Hindu, Buddhist, Sikh or Jaina religion". The act allows for interfaith marriages, and does not explicitly forbid same-sex marriages. However, it generally assumes that the spouses are not of the same sex. Concerning whom may marry, the act states that "the man must have completed his age of eighteen years, and the woman her age of fourteen years, according to the Gregorian calendar". Today, many young couples apply to marry in front of a judge or a magistrate, and swear an oath and sign affidavits stating their eligibility and intention to marry. Same-sex couples do not have access to the legal rights, benefits and obligations of marriage, including adoption and inheritance rights, among others. In November 2013, human rights activist Aung Myo Min called for the legalization of same-sex marriage, "All people have their own rights. They have right to get married to whoever they want. Men can marry men, women can marry women. This is their private right." The legalisation of same-sex marriage in Thailand received some media coverage in Myanmar.

== See also ==
- LGBT rights in Myanmar
- Recognition of same-sex unions in Asia
