= Recognition of same-sex unions in Bhutan =

Bhutan does not recognise same-sex marriage or civil unions. A gender-neutral marriage bill was under discussion in the Parliament of Bhutan in 2018, but has since stalled.

== Legal history ==
=== Background ===
Bhutan decriminalised same-sex sexual relations in 2021. Legislation to this effect passed the Parliament of Bhutan in December 2020, and received royal assent and came into force in February 2021. This was hailed as a "big stride forward" for LGBT rights in Bhutan. The Himal Southasian reported in November 2023 that "these two developments [the other being the crowning of Tashi Choden as Miss Bhutan in 2022] have encouraged [LGBT] Bhutanese, making them feel seen, recognised and included in a country where traditional values had earlier rendered them largely invisible. The community now hopes to capitalise on the momentum of the last few years to campaign for marriage equality, legal gender recognition and other crucial protections." Activists had hoped that Supriyo v. Union of India, a court case seeking to legalise same-sex marriage in India, would "bring a positive outcome that would also nudge Bhutan in the right direction." However, the court dismissed the case as a matter for the Parliament to address. Nevertheless, activists hope that "formal dialogue among community bodies and policymakers [...] will help bring clarity on issues like marriage equality."

=== Restrictions ===
Laws regarding homosexuality in Asia Same-sex sexual activity legal Marriage performed Marriage recognized Other type of partnership Unregistered cohabitation No recognition of same-sex couples Ambiguous Restriction on freedom of expression, not enforced Severe restriction of association with arrests or detention Same-sex sexual activity illegal Prison, not enforced Prison Death penalty on books, not enforced Enforced death penalty

Bhutanese law does not provide for same-sex marriages or other form of relationship recognition such as civil unions or domestic partnerships. The Marriage Act of 1980 (Dzongkha: གཉེན་འབྲེལ་གྱི་ཁྲིམས་ཡིག་ ༡༩༨༠, Gnyen 'brel gyi Khrims yig; Nepali: विवाह ऐन १९८०, Vivāha Aina) states that "a person has the right to marry any other person, irrespective of status, caste, wealth or appearance, provided the persons contracting the marriage thereof have expressly consented to their marriage." However, the act generally refers to married spouses as "man and wife". It states that to receive a marriage license the couple "shall have to present before the Court as sureties a male person for the bridegroom and a female person for the bride". If no provisions are contravened, then the couple "shall be recognised as a man and wife". The Constitution of Bhutan does not explicitly address marriage or same-sex marriage, but states that "the State shall endeavour to promote those conditions that are conducive to co-operation in community life and the integrity of the extended family structure."

A marriage bill with gender-neutral language was discussed during the 2018 summer parliamentary session, but was deferred due to the 2018 parliamentary election. A progressive government led by Druk Nyamrup Tshogpa was elected in that election, and LGBT activists expressed hope that conversation on the bill would be revived. However, no discussion on the bill took place before the 2023–24 election. When asked by a reporter in September 2022 if repealing the articles that criminalised same-sex sexual relations would be "only the first step", Prime Minister Lotay Tshering responded that "now, everything will be easier", including same-sex marriage. MP Dorji Khandu was also vocal in support of the legalization of same-sex marriage during discussions on the bill decriminalizing homosexuality. Due to their inability to marry under Bhutanese law, same-sex couples do not enjoy the rights, benefits, obligations and responsibilities of marriage, including inheritance, adoption rights, and marital tax benefits.

== See also ==
- LGBT rights in Bhutan
- Recognition of same-sex unions in Asia
- Recognition of same-sex unions in India
- Same-sex marriage in Nepal
