= Recognition of same-sex unions in Asia =

Laws regarding homosexuality in Asia Same-sex sexual activity legal Marriage performed Marriage recognized Other type of partnership Unregistered cohabitation No recognition of same-sex couples Ambiguous Restriction on freedom of expression, not enforced Severe restriction of association with arrests or detention Same-sex sexual activity illegal Prison, not enforced Prison Death penalty on books, not enforced Enforced death penalty

Debate has occurred throughout Asia over proposals to legalize same-sex marriage as well as civil unions.

Following a Constitutional Court ruling and a subsequent legislative act, Taiwan became the first country in Asia to legalize same-sex marriage nationwide on 24 May 2019, followed by Thailand on 23 January 2025.

In addition, Israel recognises same-sex marriages performed abroad, though not as full marriage, and same-sex marriages are legal in the UK sovereign base areas of Akrotiri and Dhekelia and the British Indian Ocean Territory.

Israel also recognises unregistered cohabitation for same-sex couples. Some cities in Cambodia provide same-sex couples with some limited rights and benefits, including hospital visitation rights. Several prefectures in Japan issue partnership certificates for same-sex couples. In Hong Kong, the same-sex partners of residents can receive spousal visas and spousal benefits.

== Current situation ==
=== National level ===
| Status | Country | Legal since | Country population (Last Census count) |
|---|---|---|---|
| Marriage (2 countries) | Taiwan | 2019 | 23,400,220 |
| Marriage (2 countries) | Thailand | 2025 | 65,932,105 |
| Subtotal | — | — | 89,332,325 (1.9% of the Asian population) |
| Civil union (1 country) | Cyprus | 2015 | 1,117,000 |
| Subtotal | — | — | 1,117,000 (0.05% of the Asian population) |
| Recognition of foreign marriage (1 country) | Israel | 2006 | 10,026,900 |
| Subtotal | — | — | 10,026,900 (0.1% of the Asian population) |
| Temporary marriage-like union (1 country) | Nepal | 2024 | 29,164,578 |
| Subtotal | — | — | 29,164,578 (0.7% of the Asian population) |
| Total | — | — | 133,640,803 (2.75% of the Asian population) |
| No recognition (38 countries) * same-sex sexual activity illegal | Afghanistan* | — | 31,575,018 |
| No recognition (38 countries) * same-sex sexual activity illegal | Azerbaijan | — | 10,218,536 |
| No recognition (38 countries) * same-sex sexual activity illegal | Bahrain | — | 1,496,300 |
| No recognition (38 countries) * same-sex sexual activity illegal | Bangladesh* | — | 165,159,000 |
| No recognition (38 countries) * same-sex sexual activity illegal | Bhutan | — | 727,145 |
| No recognition (38 countries) * same-sex sexual activity illegal | Brunei* | — | 422,678 |
| No recognition (38 countries) * same-sex sexual activity illegal | China | — | 1,393,970,000 |
| No recognition (38 countries) * same-sex sexual activity illegal | (Timor-Leste) East Timor | — | 1,261,407 |
| No recognition (38 countries) * same-sex sexual activity illegal | India | — | 1,402,737,000 |
| No recognition (38 countries) * same-sex sexual activity illegal | Indonesia | — | 265,015,300 |
| No recognition (38 countries) * same-sex sexual activity illegal | Iran* | — | 81,773,300 |
| No recognition (38 countries) * same-sex sexual activity illegal | Iraq* | — | 39,339,753 |
| No recognition (38 countries) * same-sex sexual activity illegal | Japan | — | 126,490,000 |
| No recognition (38 countries) * same-sex sexual activity illegal | Jordan | — | 10,235,500 |
| No recognition (38 countries) * same-sex sexual activity illegal | Kazakhstan | — | 20,286,084 |
| No recognition (38 countries) * same-sex sexual activity illegal | Kuwait* | — | 4,226,920 |
| No recognition (38 countries) * same-sex sexual activity illegal | Laos | — | 6,961,210 |
| No recognition (38 countries) * same-sex sexual activity illegal | Lebanon | — | 6,093,509 |
| No recognition (38 countries) * same-sex sexual activity illegal | Malaysia* | — | 34,112,400 |
| No recognition (38 countries) * same-sex sexual activity illegal | Maldives* | — | 378,114 |
| No recognition (38 countries) * same-sex sexual activity illegal | Myanmar* | — | 53,862,731 |
| No recognition (38 countries) * same-sex sexual activity illegal | North Korea | — | 25,610,672 |
| No recognition (38 countries) * same-sex sexual activity illegal | Oman* | — | 4,633,752 |
| No recognition (38 countries) * same-sex sexual activity illegal | Pakistan* | — | 201,938,000 |
| No recognition (38 countries) * same-sex sexual activity illegal | Philippines | — | 114,123,600 |
| No recognition (38 countries) * same-sex sexual activity illegal | Qatar* | — | 2,450,285 |
| No recognition (38 countries) * same-sex sexual activity illegal | Saudi Arabia* | — | 33,413,660 |
| No recognition (38 countries) * same-sex sexual activity illegal | Singapore | — | 6,036,900 |
| No recognition (38 countries) * same-sex sexual activity illegal | South Korea | — | 51,207,874 |
| No recognition (38 countries) * same-sex sexual activity illegal | Sri Lanka* | — | 21,444,000 |
| No recognition (38 countries) * same-sex sexual activity illegal | Syria* | — | 24,672,760 |
| No recognition (38 countries) * same-sex sexual activity illegal | Tajikistan | — | 8,931,000 |
| No recognition (38 countries) * same-sex sexual activity illegal | Turkey | — | 85,664,944 |
| No recognition (38 countries) * same-sex sexual activity illegal | Turkmenistan* | — | 7,057,841 |
| No recognition (38 countries) * same-sex sexual activity illegal | United Arab Emirates* | — | 9,541,615 |
| No recognition (38 countries) * same-sex sexual activity illegal | Uzbekistan* | — | 32,653,900 |
| No recognition (38 countries) * same-sex sexual activity illegal | Vietnam | — | 100,309,209 |
| No recognition (38 countries) * same-sex sexual activity illegal | Yemen* | — | 28,915,284 |
| Subtotal | — | — | 4,385,382,645 (95.37% of the Asian population) |
| Constitutional ban on marriage (6 countries) | Armenia | 2015 | 2,969,800 |
| Constitutional ban on marriage (6 countries) | Cambodia | 1993 | 17,336,307 |
| Constitutional ban on marriage (6 countries) | (Georgia (country)) Georgia | 2018 | 3,694,600 |
| Constitutional ban on marriage (6 countries) | Kyrgyzstan | 2016 | 7,161,900 |
| Constitutional ban on marriage (6 countries) | Mongolia | 1992 | 3,504,741 |
| Constitutional ban on marriage (6 countries) | Russia | 2020 | 146,150,789 |
| Subtotal | — | — | 179,180,789 (3.9% of the Asian population) |
| Total | — | — | 4,564,563,434 (97.25% of the Asian population) |

=== Sub-national level ===
| Status | Country | Jurisdiction | Legal since | Jurisdiction population (Last Census count) |
|---|---|---|---|---|
| Marriage (2 jurisdictions) | United Kingdom | (United Kingdom) Akrotiri and Dhekelia | 2014 | 15,700 |
| Marriage (2 jurisdictions) | United Kingdom | British Indian Ocean Territory | 2014 | 3,000 (military personnel only) |
| Total | | | | 18,700 |

=== Partially-recognized and unrecognized states ===
| Status | Country | Since | State population (Last estimate count) |
|---|---|---|---|
| No recognition (4 states) | Abkhazia | — | 242,862 |
| No recognition (4 states) | Northern Cyprus | | 476,214 |
| No recognition (4 states) | Palestine (Note: Same-sex sexual activity legal in the West Bank, but legal status in the Gaza Strip is unclear.) | — | 4,780,978 |
| No recognition (4 states) | South Ossetia | — | 53,532 |
| Total | — | — | 5,390,998 (0.1% of the Asian population) |

== Public opinion ==
Indicates the country/territory has legalized same-sex marriage nationwide
Indicates that same-sex marriage rights are pending
Indicates that the country has civil unions or registered partnerships
Indicates that same-sex sexual activity is illegal

Opinion polls for same-sex marriage by country
| Country or territory | Pollster | Year | For | Against | Neutral (Note: Also comprises: Don't know; No answer; Other; Refused.) | Margin of error | Source |
|---|---|---|---|---|---|---|---|
| Armenia | Pew Research Center | 2015 | 3% | 96% | 1% | ±3% | |
| Cambodia | Pew Research Center | 2023 | 57% | 42% | 1% | | |
| China | Ipsos | 2021 | 43% | 19% | | - | |
| (Georgia (country)) Georgia | Women’s Initiatives Supporting Group | 2021 | 10% (12%) | 75% (88%) | 15% | | |
| Hong Kong | Pew Research Center | 2023 | 58% | 40% | 2% | | |
| India | Pew Research Center | 2023 | 53% | 43% | 4% | ±3.6% | |
| Indonesia | Pew Research Center | 2023 | 5% | 92% | 3% | ±3.6% | |
| Israel | Pew Research Center | 2023 | 36% | 56% | 8% | ±3.6% | |
| Japan | Kyodo News | 2023 | 64% (72%) | 25% (28%) | 11% | | |
| Japan | Asahi Shimbun | 2023 | 72% (80%) | 18% (20%) | 10% | | |
| Japan | Ipsos | 2023 | 38% | 40% [31% support some rights] | 22% not sure | ±3.5% | |
| Japan | Pew Research Center | 2023 | 68% | 26% | 6% | ±2.75% | |
| Kazakhstan | Pew Research Center | 2016 | 7% | 89% | 4% | - | |
| Malaysia | Pew Research Center | 2023 | 17% | 82% | 1% | | |
| Philippines | SWS | 2018 | 22% | 61% | 16% | | |
| Russia | Ipsos | 2021 | 17% | 52% | | - | |
| Singapore | Ipsos | 2023 | 32% | 50% [23% support some rights] | 19% | ±3.5% | |
| Singapore | Pew Research Center | 2023 | 45% | 51% | 4% | | |
| South Korea | Ipsos | 2023 | 35% | 42% [18% support some rights] | 23% not sure | ±3.5% | |
| South Korea | Pew Research Center | 2023 | 41% | 56% | 3% | | |
| Sri Lanka | Pew Research Center | 2023 | 23% | 69% | 8% | | |
| Taiwan | CNA | 2023 | 63% | 37% | | | |
| Taiwan | Pew Research Center | 2023 | 45% | 43% | 12% | | |
| Thailand | Ipsos | 2023 | 55% | 29% [18% support some rights] | 16% not sure | ±3.5% | |
| Thailand | Pew Research Center | 2023 | 60% | 32% | 8% | | |
| Turkey | Ipsos | 2023 | 20% | 52% [22% support some rights] | 28% not sure | ±3.5% (Note: [+ more urban/educated than representative]) | |
| Vietnam | Pew Research Center | 2023 | 65% | 30% | 5% | | |

In 2019, a survey by The Economist found that 45% of respondents in the Asia-Pacific region believed same-sex marriage is inevitable in the region, with 31% of respondents disagreeing. Also, three-quarters of those surveyed reported a more open climate for LGBT rights compared to three years ago. Of those reporting an improving climate for LGBT people, 38% cited a change in policies or laws, while 36% said coverage of LGBT issues in mainstream media was a major factor. The top reason cited for diminishing openness was anti-LGBT advocacy by religious institutions.

== See also ==
- LGBTQ rights in Asia
- Recognition of same-sex unions in Africa
- Recognition of same-sex unions in the Americas
- Recognition of same-sex unions in Europe
- Recognition of same-sex unions in Oceania
