= LGBTQ rights in Cambodia =

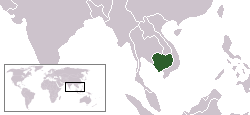
- Cambodia
- Legal status: Legal
- Gender identity: No
- Military: Legal
- Discrimination protections: No

Family rights
- Recognition of relationships: No national legal recognition of same-sex relationships, some localities offer limited rights
- Restrictions: Same-sex marriage constitutionally banned since 1993
- Adoption: No

Lesbian, gay, bisexual, transgender and queer (LGBTQ) people in Cambodia face legal challenges not experienced by non-LGBTQ residents. Although same-sex sexual activity is legal in Cambodia, it provides no anti-discrimination protections for LGBTQ people, nor does it prohibit hate crimes based on sexual orientation and gender identity.

King Norodom Sihamoni supports the legalisation of same-sex marriage. After the Taiwanese Constitutional Court ruled that banning same-sex marriage was unconstitutional, many called on Cambodia to legalise same-sex marriage.

Phnom Penh and Siem Reap have a visible LGBTQ scene, with many bars, clubs and other venues catering to the LGBTQ community. Pride parades have been held in Cambodia since 2003, and have been gaining traction every year. However, while LGBTQ visitors tend to feel accepted, many LGBTQ Cambodians report societal discrimination, including forced opposite-sex marriages, discrimination at work and bullying at schools. Several human rights group, notably the Cambodian Center for Human Rights, CamASEAN and the Rainbow Community Kampuchea, work to reduce LGBTQ-related discrimination and raise awareness of LGBTQ people. Through their work, they have persuaded the Government to introduce new LGBTQ-inclusive education classes in all Cambodian schools and to offer same-sex couples limited legal recognition.

== Legality of same-sex sexual activity ==
Private, adult, non-commercial and consensual sexual activity between people of the same sex is legal in Cambodia, and was never criminalised in the history of the country. The age of consent is 15, regardless of gender identity and sexual orientation. A few aspects of the Criminal Code may impact the rights of LGBTQ people living in Cambodia: it is illegal in Cambodia to be a prostitute or live in the same residence as prostitutes. This becomes an issue when LGBTQ people live on the streets and do not have access to education. Article 298 of the Criminal Code prohibits soliciting for sex in public, even if the sexual activity will take place in private, with fines.

== Recognition of same-sex relationships ==
The Civil Code and the Law on the Marriage and Family explicitly ban same-sex marriage and do not recognise civil partnerships in Cambodia. However, there has been greater public awareness about same-sex couples since the 1990s.

Since September 1993, the Constitution of Cambodia has defined marriage as a union between one man and one woman. The provision in the Constitution related to marriage was modified in 2011 but still defines marriage as between "one husband and one wife". Although, cases of same-sex marriage could still be officiated over in religious ceremonies. In one case of partnership recognition, Khav Sokha and Pum Eth were married on 12 March 1995, in the village of Kro Bao Ach Kok, in Kandal Province, where they are from. Sokha said in an interview to the Phnom Penh Post, "The authorities thought it was strange, but they agreed to tolerate it because I have three children already (from a previous marriage). They said that if we were both single (and childless), we would not be allowed to get married because we could not produce children." Thus, it was a fully acknowledged marriage, with official approval, and there was not really any reaction to it. It was a popular event, with 250 people coming to the ceremony and partying, including Buddhist monks and high officials from the province.

In February 2004, the issue of LGBTQ rights in Cambodia was discussed by then King Norodom Sihanouk. King Sihanouk wrote on his website that he was impressed by marriage of same-sex partners in San Francisco, and that if his people wished for same-sex marriage to be legalized in Cambodia, he would do so. King Sihanouk also stated that he believed that God views homosexuals, as well as transvestites, as equal because "[God loves] wide range of tastes". Current King Norodom Sihamoni also supports the legalisation of same-sex marriage.

In 2015, Council of Ministers spokesman Phay Siphan expressed support for same-sex marriage in Cambodia, by saying that current law already protects LGBTQ people from discrimination. The Cambodian Center for Human Rights disputed this statement and called on the Government to pass legislation in order to ensure LGBTQ equality.

The Rainbow Community Kampuchea (Khmer: សហគមន៍ឥន្ទធនូកម្ពុជា; RoCK), with the help of local authorities, has created a formal relationship registry program, called the "Declaration of Family Relationship". According to RoCK, "the Declaration of Family Relationship is a civil contract between two people who are willing to be together and share responsibility taking care of the family, children and distribute the joint asset, as legal spouses do". By May 2018, the civil contract had been introduced to 50 communes in 15 provinces, and 21 couples had signed the forms.

In July 2019, the Cambodian Government accepted recommendations to legalise same-sex marriage from Iceland, the Netherlands and Canada during the country's third Universal Periodic Review, which is held by the United Nations Human Rights Committee (UNHRC).

== Adoption and parenting ==
By law, only married couples may adopt in Cambodia. However, local authorities tend to be quite lax, and many same-sex couples have been able to adopt children.

LGBTQ individuals are allowed to adopt.

== Gender identity and expression ==
Cambodian law does not allow for gender marker changes, nor for gender-affirming surgeries.

== Discrimination protections ==
The Constitution does not expressly protect LGBTQ people from discrimination, but it does guarantee equal rights for all citizens, irrespective of sex or "other status". Similarly, while sex discrimination is prohibited in civil rights laws, discrimination on the basis of sexual orientation or gender identity is not expressly prohibited in such areas as employment, education, health care, housing, banking or public accommodations.

In 2007, Prime Minister of Cambodia Hun Sen publicly stated that he was disowning and disinheriting his adopted daughter because she is a lesbian and had married another woman. However, in the same statement, Hun Sen stated that he did not want other parents to mistreat their gay children.

In 2010, the Cambodian Center for Human Rights (CCHR) established the Sexual Orientation and Gender Identity Project to empower LGBTQ people throughout Cambodia to advocate for their rights and to improve respect for LGBTQ people throughout Cambodia. In December 2010, the CCHR published a ground-breaking report on the situation of LGBTQ people in Cambodia.

In January 2019, Cambodia received recommendations from Iceland, Mexico, Sweden and Uruguay to outlaw discrimination on the basis of sexual orientation, and establish educational programmes and campaigns to raise awareness of LGBTQ people and discrimination. While Cambodia did not directly confirm whether it would enact such legislation, it did state that "the Government values and respects LGBTQ rights".

=== Media ===
In 2015, the Ministry of Information sent out a letter imploring popular media outlets in Cambodia to stop mocking the LGBT community. The letter cites the Constitution that ridiculing the LGBTQ community deprives them of "the honor and rights of LGBTQ people who are also protected by the state's law as well as other citizens".

== School curriculum and sex education ==
In June 2017, the Khmer Government announced new life skill courses about sex education. The courses cover topics such as sexual health, gender-based violence, gender identity and combating discrimination against the LGBTQ population. They became part of the curriculum in all of Cambodia's schools in 2018. Previously, LGBTQ activists, along with the Ministry of Education, were active in training more than 3,000 teachers in 20 schools across nine Cambodian provinces in ways to include LGBTQ issues in their classes.

== Living conditions ==
Although Cambodia is considered tolerant toward the LGBTQ community, there are widespread reports that discrimination is still present. A July 2019 survey conducted by Rainbow Community Kampuchea, titled "Family Violence towards Lesbian, Bisexual and Transgender (LBT) people in Cambodia" in which 61 LBT people (23 lesbians, 4 bisexual women and 34 trans men) were surveyed, revealed that more than 80% of the respondents had suffered emotional and physical violence from their family members, 35% had considered suicide following their families' non-acceptance, and 10% had experienced sexual violence or were forced into heterosexual marriage.

=== Traditional cultural mores ===
The Khmer language recognizes male (ប្រុស brŏs) and female (ស្រី srei) as the dominant genders, but also includes term khteuy (ខ្ទើយ; equivalent to the Thai kathoey, which is derived from the Khmer word) for a third gender intermediate between the other two: it describes a person who has the external physical characteristics of either brŏs or srei but behaves in a manner appropriate to the other. As in Thailand, the term kathoey now refers almost exclusively to the physiologically masculine pair of this term – i.e., physical males who have a female identity, most often expressed in cross-dressing.

Evidence suggests that people of diverse sexual orientation and gender identity were an accepted part of society over 700 years ago. According to the writings of a Chinese diplomat named Chou Ta-kuan (also spelled Zhou Daguan), who visited the Kingdom at the time, there were men who dressed as women in the vicinity of Angkor Wat, indicating the prevalence of gender non-conformity during that period.

The broad category of khteuy covers two distinct sub-groupings, "short hairs" and "long hairs". Short hairs (សក់ខ្លី sák khlei) are men who dress and identify as men but have sex with "real" men; they are usually married, and very few of them have sex exclusively with men. Long hairs (សក់វែង sák vêng, also called ស្រីស្រស់ srei srás, meaning "charming girls") identify and behave as women, and may use hormones and surgery to change their physical sex. They call themselves kteuy, but may feel insulted if outsiders use this term.

"Real men" (ប្រុសពិតប្រាកដ brŏs pĭt brakâd), men who identify, appear and behave as brŏs, are the object of desire for both "long" and "short hairs". All "real men" are, or will be, married; some have sex only with women, but others have a range of sexual partners.

Khteuys face significant problems of social acceptance (including issues relating to marriage and children) and violence. The general social environment towards khteuys is tolerant, but those who transgress gender behaviour are nevertheless treated with contempt and subject to discrimination ("real men" with important jobs who engage in same-sex relations hide their lifestyles). Some "real men" are violently prejudiced against "non-real men", and may attack or rape them (former King Sihanouk once commented that "real men", not minorities, are the source of violence in society).

The cultural tolerance of LGBTQ people has yet to advance LGBTQ rights legislation. While the cultural mores and Buddhism tend to produce a degree of tolerance for LGBTQ people, harassment and discrimination still occur and there is also intense social pressure to marry a suitable person of the opposite sex, and raise a family.

=== HIV/AIDS ===
In 2019, Keo Remy, the director of the Cambodia Human Rights Committee, said that there has been an increase of HIV infections within the LGBTQ community, especially among people under 30.

=== LGBT tourism ===
While not officially government-sponsored, there is also an active business for LGBTQ tourists visiting Cambodia.

In February 2011, after some Cambodian tourism businesses had set up a global campaign called Adore Cambodia! to let LGBTQ tourists know they are welcome in the country, the Ministry of Tourism welcomed this initiative. "We have no policy to discriminate on sex, national and religious grounds. We really support them," said So Sokvuthy from the Ministry.

=== Annual Pride celebrations ===
Cambodia's first ever LGBTQ Pride celebration was held in 2003 in the capital city of Phnom Penh. It is now a yearly event that "openly celebrates the diversity of Cambodia". Once a taboo subject, there has been an increasing acceptance of homosexuality among Cambodians. In 2006, about 400 Cambodians came to support and celebrate Pride. The first Siem Reap Pride was held in 2018.

=== The Gay City ===
In 2010, it was reported that a significant number of poor and working class LGBTQ people had relocated to Beoung Kak 2. Public Radio International referred to this city as "Cambodia’s first gay town".

=== Popular culture ===
Tolerance for LGBTQ people is seen within traditional cultural mores along with the modern popular cultural mores. The first ever Cambodian-made film depicting a homosexual relationship debuted in early 2009, going on to become a blockbuster in the country; it was called Who Am I?. It was written and directed by Phoan Phuong Bopha and was shown on Cambodian Television Network (CTN), the country's most-watched TV station, dozens of times. In 2015, Cambodia got its first LGBTQ magazine, Q Cambodia.

== Public opinion ==
In 2015, TNS Cambodia conducted a survey focused on the opinions and attitudes towards LGBTQ people in Cambodia. According to the survey, 55% of Cambodians were in favour of same-sex marriage, while 30% were opposed and 15% were neutral. Additionally, a majority of Cambodians reported personally knowing an openly LGBTQ person. However, most LGBTQ Cambodians said they had been victim of discrimination when coming out to their families and friends.

In an interview conducted in 2018, Ith Sovannareach, founder of La Chhouk Recycled & Creative Fashion, said that "Just five or 10 years ago, Cambodians saw the LGBTQ community as social trash... People saw them as unnatural strangers... But now there is less discrimination, as we've seen more coverage on television and in newspapers about their capabilities."

A poll by Pew Research Center in 2023 found that 57% of Cambodian supported same-sex marriage while 42% opposed.

== Human rights reports ==
=== 2016 Cambodian Center for Human Rights report ===
In September 2016, the Cambodian Center for Human Rights released a report regarding transgender women, reporting that 92% have experienced verbal abuse, 43% have been physically assaulted, 31% have been sexually assaulted, and that 25% were raped. Additionally, approximately 38% of participants were arrested, and over 90% report that it was because they were transgender.

Trans sex workers in Siem Reap have reported that they were forced to bathe in dirty river water, sometimes while naked, and to leave the area, whereas cisgender sex workers were not documented to have had the same treatment. Some have received bribes to avoid it, but it was not always provided.

=== 2017 United States Department of State report ===
In 2017, the United States Department of State reported the following, concerning the status of LGBT rights in Cambodia:

- "The most significant human rights issues included: extrajudicial killings; at least one disappearance by local security forces; continued prisoner abuse in government facilities; arbitrary arrests by the government, including the warrantless arrest of the CNRP leader Kem Sokha; increased restrictions on freedoms of speech, assembly, and association including on press freedom and online expression; the use of violence and imprisonment—both actual and threatened—to intimidate the political opposition and civil society as well as to suppress dissenting voices; corruption; violence against women and lesbian, gay, bisexual, transgender and intersex persons; child abuse; and forced labor."
- Acts of Violence, Discrimination, and Other Abuses Based on Sexual Orientation and Gender Identity
  "No laws criminalize consensual same-sex sexual conduct, nor was there official discrimination against lesbian, gay, bisexual, transgender, and intersex (LGBTI) persons, although some societal discrimination and stereotyping persisted, particularly in rural areas.
  In general LGBTI persons had limited job opportunities due to discrimination and exclusion. LGBTI persons were frequently harassed and bullied because of their appearance and their work in the entertainment and commercial sex sectors. There were no reports of government discrimination based on sexual orientation in employment, citizenship, access to education, or health care. The general population, however, typically treated persons involved in consensual same-sex relationships with fear and suspicion.
  A local LGBTI rights organization reported more than 100 incidents of violence or abuse against LGBTI persons, including domestic violence by family members. Stigma or intimidation may have inhibited further reporting of incidents."

== Summary table ==
Same-sex sexual activity legal	Yes (Always legal)
Equal age of consent (15)	Yes (Always equal)
Anti-discrimination laws in employment only	No
Anti-discrimination laws in the provision of goods and services	No
Anti-discrimination laws in all other areas (incl. indirect discrimination, hate speech)	No
Same-sex marriages	No / Yes (Constitutional ban since 1993; one same-sex marriage has been legally recognised)
Recognition of same-sex couples	No / Yes (Declaration of Family Relationship)
Stepchild adoption by same-sex couples	No / Yes (De jure banned; though there are known cases of same-sex adoptions)
Joint adoption by same-sex couples	No / Yes (De jure banned; though there are known cases of same-sex adoptions)
LGBT people allowed to serve openly in the military	Yes (No explicit ban)
Right to change legal gender	No
Access to IVF for lesbians	No
Commercial surrogacy for gay male couples	No
MSM allowed to donate blood	Yes

== See also ==
- Recognition of same-sex unions in Cambodia
- LGBTQ rights in Asia
- Human rights in Cambodia
