= Recognition of same-sex unions in Singapore =

Singapore does not recognise same-sex marriages or civil unions. In 2022, the Parliament of Singapore passed a constitutional amendment giving itself "the power to define, regulate, protect and promote the institution of marriage".

== Legal history ==
=== Housing and immigration rights ===
Access to public housing in Singapore is an important benefit granted to married couples. Public housing is the most affordable type of housing for the middle and working class due to the high price of housing in Singapore. Purchasing a Housing Development Board (HDB) flat is a major step towards married life for almost all couples intending to formalize their relationship and is entrenched in Singaporean society. Upwards of 80% of Singaporean families live in public housing apartments sold by the government. However, same-sex couples in Singapore, whether citizens or foreigners, cannot own their own homes through the public housing scheme, and many rent as they are unable to afford private housing. Same-sex partners—both partners must be above 35 years of age and Singaporean citizens—can purchase a flat under the Joint Singles Scheme. Private housing, a type of property typically several times more expensive than public housing, but open to the public and foreigners, may be purchased by same-sex couples.

The Government of Singapore does not recognise same-sex unions validly performed abroad. As a result, dependent visas, which are usually issued for heterosexual spouses, are not available to same-sex couples. Same-sex dependent partners have to apply for a residence permit on their own merit. Additionally, same-sex couples are not afforded equal tax benefits, wills and spousal insurance benefits as different-sex couples. There is also no recognition of same-sex unions in most areas of concern such as hospital visitation and Central Provident Fund benefits.

=== Restrictions ===
Laws regarding homosexuality in Asia Same-sex sexual activity legal Marriage performed Marriage recognized Other type of partnership Unregistered cohabitation No recognition of same-sex couples Ambiguous Restriction on freedom of expression, not enforced Severe restriction of association with arrests or detention Same-sex sexual activity illegal Prison, not enforced Prison Death penalty on books, not enforced Enforced death penalty

Same-sex marriages are not recognised in Singapore, with the Women's Charter (Malay: Piagam Wanita; Chinese: 妇女宪章, Fùnǚ Xiànzhāng; Tamil: மாதர் சாசனம், Mātar Cācaṉam) stating that marriage not between "a woman and man" is void. On 21 August 2022, Prime Minister Lee Hsien Loong announced that the government would repeal Section 377A of the Penal Code, effectively ending the criminalisation of private, consensual sexual relations between men. On 22 August, Minister of Home Affairs and Law K. Shanmugam added that the Constitution of Singapore would be amended to "protect" Parliament's right to define marriage, leaving open the possibility for Parliament to legalise same-sex marriages or civil unions through a simple majority in the future. Shanmugam clarified that a definition of marriage would not be enshrined in the Constitution, stating that "any political party or group that wants to push for same-sex marriage will be able to do so."

On 20 October 2022, the government tabled a draft constitutional amendment giving Parliament "the power to define, regulate, protect and promote the institution of marriage". It was debated in the Parliament on 28 November along with a bill repealing Section 377A, and passed on 29 November 2022. The law was signed by President Halimah Yacob on 27 December, and published in the Republic of Singapore Government Gazette on 6 January 2023. Article 156 of the Constitution now reads:

(1) The Legislature may, by law, define, regulate, protect, safeguard, support, foster and promote the institution of marriage.
(2) Subject to any written law, the Government and any public authority may, in the exercise of their executive authority, protect, safeguard, support, foster and promote the institution of marriage.
(3) Nothing in Part 4 invalidates a law enacted before, on or after the date of commencement of the Constitution of the Republic of Singapore (Amendment No. 3) Act 2022 by reason that the law —

(a) defines marriage as a union between a man and a woman; or
(b) is based on such a definition of marriage.

(4) Nothing in Part 4 invalidates an exercise of executive authority before, on or after the date of commencement of the Constitution of the Republic of Singapore (Amendment No. 3) Act 2022 by reason that the exercise is based on a definition of marriage as a union between a man and a woman.

In June 2024, a same-sex couple, Andee Chua, 34, and Hugo Liu, 37, held a marriage ceremony in the Central Area, though the marriage lacks legal recognition. "Celebrating our wedding here allows us to share this special moment with the people we love in the place that feels like home. By having our wedding in Singapore, we are contributing to the visibility of same-sex relationships. Visibility and positive representation are very important to our community since we don't get much of that in mainstream media", said the couple. In 2026, activists called for the legalization of same-sex marriage at the annual Pink Dot rally.

== Public opinion ==
According to a 2013 survey by the Institute of Policy Studies, some 75% of Singaporeans opposed same-sex marriage. A survey conducted by the same polling organization between August 2018 and January 2019 revealed that Singaporean society was still largely conservative but becoming more supportive of LGBT rights. The survey showed that more than 20% of people believed that sexual relations between adults of the same sex were not wrong "at all" or not wrong "most of the time", a rise of about 10% from 2013. Around 27% felt the same way about same-sex marriage (up from 15% in 2013) and 30% did so about same-sex couples adopting a child (up from 24% in 2013).

In 2019, a poll conducted by YouGov showed that 34% of Singaporeans supported same-sex civil partnerships, while 43% opposed its legalization, and the remaining 23% were uncertain. Support was more notable among younger respondents: 50% of people aged 18 to 34 supported civil partnerships and 20% were opposed. In contrast, only 22% of those aged 55 and over supported. 41% of university degree holders agreed with the legalisation of same-sex partnerships, whereas only 26% of respondents without a university degree were in favour. Of those who considered themselves "very much" religious, only 23% supported civil partnerships. 51% of people who considered themselves "not at all" religious expressed support. Apart from irreligious people, majority support for same-sex partnerships was also found in respondents who identified as LGBT (71% against 22%) and those who personally knew a person in a same-sex relationship (52% against 33%).

A mid-2019 poll conducted by the Institute of Policy Studies found that opposition to same-sex marriage in Singapore had fallen to 60%, down from 74% in 2013. The poll also found that nearly six in ten Singaporeans aged between 18 and 25 believed that same-sex marriage was "not wrong". In June 2019, an online survey conducted by Blackbox Research revealed that 56% of Singaporeans were opposed to other countries following Taiwan's lead in legalising same-sex marriage, while 44% were supportive. When asked on how they felt about more than 300 same-sex couples marrying in Taiwan during the first week after the new law was passed, about 49% of those surveyed felt positive, with 14% feeling "strongly positive" and 35% feeling "somewhat positive". Conversely, 51% of respondents responded negatively, with 20% feeling "strongly negative" and 31% "somewhat negative".

A June–September 2022 Pew Research Center poll found that support for same-sex marriage in Singapore had risen to 45% and opposition had fallen to 51%. Support was highest among the religiously unaffiliated at 62%, Hindus at 60% and Buddhists at 53%, but lowest among Christians at 29% and Muslims at 21%. This level of support was the fourth highest among the six Southeast Asian countries polled, behind Vietnam at 65%, Thailand at 60% and Cambodia at 57%, but ahead of Malaysia at 17%, and Indonesia at 5%. A June 2024 Ipsos poll found an increase in support for LGBT rights, with 54% of Singaporeans agreeing that same-sex couples should be able to marry or have legal recognition, while 25% disagreed and 21% were neutral. In addition, 57% of Singaporeans agreed that same-sex couples should be able to adopt, while 30% disagreed and 13% were neutral.

== See also ==
- LGBT rights in Singapore
- Recognition of same-sex unions in Asia
