= Recognition of same-sex unions in Indonesia =

Indonesia does not recognise same-sex marriage or civil unions. Marriage laws forbid same-sex marriages and prevent the registration of marriages validly performed abroad.

== Background ==
Article 1 of the Law No. 1 of 1974 on Marriage (Indonesian: Undang-undang No. 1 Tahun 1994 tentang Perkawinan) states that marriage is "a physical and spiritual bond between a man and a woman as husband and wife, having the purpose of establishing a happy and lasting family founded on the Belief in God Almighty". Moreover, article 2 states that a marriage is only lawful if it is performed in accordance with the laws of the spouses' religion. Meanwhile, Indonesians who have entered into same-sex marriages abroad are not allowed to register their marriage in Indonesia. Article 34(1) of the Law No. 23 of 2006 on Civil Administration (Indonesian: Undang-undang No. 23 Tahun 2006 tentang Administrasi Kependudukan) obliges all marriages to be reported to local authorities within 60 days, and states that "'marriage' can only be performed between a man and a woman". Civil unions (Indonesian: persatuan sipil, pronounced [pərsaˈtu.an ˈsipɪl]) which would offer some of the rights and benefits of marriage, are also not recognized in Indonesia.

The Constitution of Indonesia does not address same-sex marriage explicitly. Article 28B states:

Every person shall have the right to establish a family and to procreate based upon lawful marriage. (Note: In some languages of Indonesia: Indonesian: Setiap orang berhak membentuk keluarga dan melanjutkan keturunan melalui perkawinan yang sah.; Javanese: ꦱꦧꦺꦤ꧀ ꦮꦺꦴꦁ ꦢꦂꦧꦺ ꦲꦏ꧀ ꦩꦔꦸꦤ꧀ ꦧꦠꦺꦃ ꦭꦤ꧀ ꦤꦁꦏꦫꦏꦺ ꦠꦸꦫꦸꦤ꧀ ꦱꦫꦤ ꦲꦺꦴꦩꦃ-ꦲꦺꦴꦩꦃ ꦱꦶꦁ ꦲꦧ꧀ꦱꦃ꧉, Saben wong darbe hak mangun bateh lan nangkarake turun sarana omah-omah sing absah.; Sundanese: ᮅᮀᮌᮜᮣ ᮏᮜᮣᮙ ᮘᮧᮌ ᮠᮊ᮪ ᮕᮤᮊᮩᮔ᮪ ᮍᮝᮍᮥᮔ᮪ ᮊᮥᮜᮝᮁᮌ ᮏᮩᮀ ᮍᮛᮥᮔ᮪ᮓᮚ᮪ᮊᮩᮔ᮪ ᮒᮥᮛᮥᮔᮔ᮪ ᮊᮥ ᮎᮛ ᮊᮝᮤᮔ᮪ ᮞᮂ., Unggal jalma boga hak pikeun ngawangun kulawarga jeung ngarundaykeun turunan ku cara kawin sah.; Balinese: ᬲᭀᬳᬂ-ᬲᭀᬳᬂ ᬚᬤ᭄ᬫ ᬫᬤᬸᬏ ᬳᬓ᭄ ᬗᬯᬯᬸᬦ᭄ ᬓᬸᬮᬯᬃᬕ ᬫᬶᬯᬄ ᬗ᭄ᬮᬦ᭄ᬢᬸᬭᬂ ᬲᭂᬦ᭄ᬢᬦ ᬫᬚᬮᬭᬦ᭄ ᬧᬯᬶᬯᬳᬦ᭄᭟, Soang-soang jadma madue hak ngawangun kulawarga miwah nglanturang sentana majalaran pawiwahan.; Bima: ᨔᨊᨗᨀᨗᨊ ᨉᨚᨕᨘ ᨊ ᨊᨈᨕᨘ ᨈᨊᨉᨗᨕᨗ (ᨖᨀ) ᨀᨈᨘᨕᨘ ᨑᨚ ᨀᨀᨗᨉᨗᨊ ᨀᨙᨒᨘᨕᨑᨁ ᨑᨚ ᨂᨁᨊ ᨑᨚ ᨂᨁᨗᨊ ᨀᨕᨗ ᨏᨕᨗ ᨊᨗᨀ ᨑ ᨊᨙᨀᨘ ᨆ ᨔᨖ᨞, Sanikina dou na ntau tandi'i (hak) katu'u ro kakiḏina keluarga ro nggana ro nggina kai ncai nika ra neku ma saha.)

Following the legalization of same-sex marriage in the United States in June 2015, proponents, including singer Sherina Munaf, posted celebratory messages on social media and many highlighted their Facebook profile pictures with rainbow filters. This caused political backlash and controversy, with the Minister of Religious Affairs, Lukman Hakim Saifuddin, responding that Indonesia "could not accept" same-sex marriage. Writing for the Indonesia at Melbourne blog, Hendri Yulius wrote, "Under Suharto's New Order (Orde Baru), anything that conflicted with the state ideology was considered foreign and a threat to Indonesian moral values and culture. The current generation is living with the legacy of this idea. We were educated to think that culture is fixed, that differences are threatening and alien, never mind the multiple interactions across cultures now possible in a globalised world. The democratic era has also provided more space for religious fundamentalism, which was strongly suppressed by the military regime. The dogmatic interpretations of religion presented by fundamentalist groups reinforce this idea of a static, unchanging culture."

In September 2015, a same-sex couple held a commitment ceremony in a five-star resort in Ubud according to traditional Hindu customs. The couple, an Indonesian and an American national, had previously married in the United States, but chose to also hold a celebration in Bali. The marriage, which was officiated by a Hindu priest, proved widely controversial, with Governor I Made Mangku Pastika calling it "a disgrace for Bali". The Grand Council of Customary Villages (Balinese: ᬫᬚᭂᬮᬶᬲ᭄ ᬤᭂᬲ ᬅᬤᬢ᭄, Majelis Desa Adat), which advises the Bali Government on issues related to culture, traditional customs and policies affecting traditional communities, issued a statement: "We emphasise that same sex marriage is not allowed in our religion. In our customary law it is also not allowed as it could cause the area to be cuntaka (or impure; ᬘᬸᬦ᭄ᬢᬓ). If the wedding ceremony really happened a purification ceremony should be held in the village where the wedding was held." In 2016, police stopped a same-sex marriage ceremony from occurring in Wonosobo, Central Java, arguing that "such a ceremony violated the law and caused discomfort among local residents". In May 2024, pictures shared online of a double marriage ceremony in Wonosobo with both grooms sitting next to each other were misconstrued as being a same-sex marriage. The pictures led to an "explosion" of homophobic rhetoric on social media despite the fact that the ceremony consisted of two sisters marrying their male partners. That same month, a same-sex couple was married in Central Halmahera, North Maluku by having one of the partners dress as a woman. The Regional Office of the Ministry of Religious Affairs requested that the marriage be annulled after discovering that both spouses were men, arguing that the ceremony "violate[d] religious and cultural sharia of the community".

== Historical and customary recognition ==
Laws regarding homosexuality in Asia Same-sex sexual activity legal Marriage performed Marriage recognized Other type of partnership Unregistered cohabitation No recognition of same-sex couples Restricted or ambiguous Restriction on freedom of expression, not enforced Severe restriction of association with arrests or detention Same-sex sexual activity illegal Prison, not enforced Prison Death penalty on books, not enforced Enforced death penalty

While there are no records of same-sex marriages being performed in pre-modern Indonesian cultures in the way they are commonly defined in Western legal systems, many local communities recognize identities and relationships that may be placed on the LGBT spectrum. A gemblak (Javanese: ꦒꦼꦩ꧀ꦧ꧀ꦭꦏ꧀, pronounced [ɡ̊əmˈb̥laʔ]) was a young Javanese boy kept by an older man (warok, ꦮꦫꦺꦴꦏ꧀) during a period of sexual abstinence or during a heterosexual marriage. The role of the gemblak was closely tied to the Reog dance. Since heterosexual relations with women were regarded as "sapping the strength of the warok", he was allowed to have a young boy, usually between 8 and 16 years of age, to serve him sexually and play a part in the dance. The gemblak sometimes dressed in female clothing, often hailed from a poor rural family and also did domestic chores for the warok. This granted him and his family great social prestige. Today, this custom is strongly discouraged by Muslim religious authorities. A similar structure existed among the Minang, where the older man (Minangkabau: induk jawi) took a male adolescent (anak jawi) as an emotional and erotic partner. The relationship included a clearly defined aspect of mutual trust and help, and continued until one of the men was ready to marry. Among the Madurese, erotic and emotional relationships between two boys or teenagers were also historically "common".

The Bugis recognize five separate genders and their culture has traditionally viewed gender as existing on a spectrum, even after conversion to Islam in the 17th century. A bissu (Buginese: ᨅᨗᨔᨘ, pronounced [ˈbisːu]) is a person who "combines aspects of all genders to form a whole", often acting as a shaman. In other cultures, some individuals are considered to fulfil a third gender role. They are "considered to be the union between male and female elements", a "unity perceived as the harmonious condition of the spiritual world", and often act as shamans or healers. Other peoples have distinct terms for gender non-conforming shamans. The Ngaju use basir, the Torajan use to burake tambolang, and the Pamona use tadu mburake. They "merge both males and females in their bodies as it symbolizes the dualism that represented the wholeness of life after death." In Iban society, the manang bali "receive directives, through dreams, from the deity Menjaya Manang Raja to become shamans. They must obey, or face pain of death or madness. As part of responding to their spiritual calling, male-bodied individuals adopt the mannerisms, attire and lifestyle of women, even taking on male partners as husbands." These shamans play "important roles in their communities", being honoured and admired, but "this tradition has diminished due to modern values and education brought by colonialism".

== Public opinion ==
An online polling conducted by the International Lesbian, Gay, Bisexual, Trans and Intersex Association (ILGA) in October 2016 found that 69% respondents were against the legalization of same-sex marriage, while 14% supported and 17% were neutral.

A February–May 2023 Pew Research Center poll showed that 5% of Indonesians supported same-sex marriage (3% "strongly" and 2% "somewhat"), while 92% opposed (88% "strongly" and 4% "somewhat") and 3% were undecided or did not answer. This level of support was the lowest among the six Southeast Asian countries polled, behind Vietnam at 65%, Thailand at 60%, Cambodia at 57%, Singapore at 45%, and Malaysia at 17%.

== See also ==
- LGBT rights in Indonesia
- Recognition of same-sex unions in Asia
