= Same-sex marriage in Zacatecas =

Same-sex marriage has been legal in Zacatecas since 30 December 2021. On 14 December 2021, the Congress of Zacatecas passed a same-sex marriage bill by 18 votes to 11. The legislation was published in the official state gazette on 29 December, following Governor David Monreal Ávila's signature, and came into force the following day. Zacatecas was the 24th Mexican state to open marriage to same-sex couples. Prior to statewide legalisation, five municipalities of Zacatecas issued marriage licenses to same-sex couples despite a state ban, comprising about a quarter of the state population. These municipalities were Zacatecas, Cuauhtémoc, Villanueva, Miguel Auza and Fresnillo.

== Legal history ==
=== Background ===
The Supreme Court of Justice of the Nation ruled on 12 June 2015 that state bans on same-sex marriage are unconstitutional nationwide. The court's ruling is considered a "jurisprudential thesis" and did not invalidate state laws, meaning that same-sex couples denied the right to marry would still have to seek individual amparos in court. The ruling standardized the procedures for judges and courts throughout Mexico to approve all applications for same-sex marriages and made the approval mandatory. Specifically, the court ruled that bans on same-sex marriage violate Articles 1 and 4 of the Constitution of Mexico. Article 1 of the Constitution states:

Any form of discrimination, based on ethnic or national origin, gender, age, disabilities, social status, medical conditions, religion, opinions, sexual orientation, marital status, or any other form, which violates the human dignity or seeks to annul or diminish the rights and freedoms of the people, is prohibited. (Note: Spanish: Queda prohibida toda discriminación motivada por origen étnico o nacional, el género, la edad, las discapacidades, la condición social, las condiciones de salud, la religión, las opiniones, las preferencias sexuales, el estado civil o cualquier otra que atente contra la dignidad humana y tenga por objeto anular o menoscabar los derechos y libertades de las personas.)

In July 2016, Rodolfo Flores Nava and Francisco Domínguez Galindo became the first same-sex couple to marry in the state, after having successfully received an amparo two months prior. In Fresnillo, a lesbian couple received an amparo on 3 April 2017, followed by another couple a few months later. They married in October 2017 in a private ceremony alongside family and friends, marking the first same-sex marriage in Fresnillo. By January 2019, three same-sex couples had married in Zacatecas.

=== Early bills ===
A civil union bill was first proposed in Zacatecas in June 2011. The measure, which would have provided same-sex couples with some of the rights and benefits offered to married opposite-sex couples, was submitted to the Congress of Zacatecas on 30 June, but was stalled in committee. In 2013, the bill's main sponsor, Jorge Álvarez Máynez, said that it was "not prioritized". It had gathered the support of one deputy from the Institutional Revolutionary Party (PRI), some independents, and some deputies from the Party of the Democratic Revolution (PRD), but was opposed by the conservative National Action Party (PAN). It was discussed again in March 2014, but Congress did not approve the measure.

Reacting to the 2015 Supreme Court ruling, a deputy from the Party of the Democratic Revolution announced on 18 June that she would submit a bill to reform the state's civil and family codes to give same-sex couples the same rights as married heterosexual couples. A spokeswoman for the National Action Party immediately announced the party's opposition and condemned the Supreme Court ruling. The PRD bill was placed in the "legislative freezer" (congelador legislativo), having not even received a first reading two years after introduction. The July 2018 elections resulted in the National Regeneration Movement (MORENA), which supports the legalization of same-sex marriage, winning a plurality of legislative seats in Zacatecas. In late February 2019, MORENA Deputy Mónica Borrego Estrada introduced a new same-sex marriage bill to Congress, which she was hopeful would be passed "soon". Borrego Estrada called the heterosexual definition of marriage "a violation of the constitutions of Mexico and Zacatecas". The National Council to Prevent Discrimination also called on the state to legalize same-sex marriage. On 14 August 2019, Congress rejected the bill in a 11–13 vote with 2 abstentions.

=== Passage of legislation in 2021 ===
In September 2021, Deputy Xerardo Ramírez Muñoz from the Labor Party (PT) introduced a bill to legalize same-sex marriage to the Congress of Zacatecas. The bill was passed by a Congress committee on 9 December, and a final vote was scheduled for Tuesday, 14 December. The legislation was passed by Congress on 14 December by a vote of 18–11 with 0 abstentions. The law was published on 29 December, following Governor David Monreal Ávila's signature, and took effect the following day, on 30 December. The law ensures that married same-sex couples enjoy the same rights, benefits and responsibilities as married opposite-sex couples, including tax benefits, immigration rights, property rights and inheritance, among others, but excluding adoption rights. Article 100 of the Family Code was amended to read as follows: Marriage is the legal union of two people who, through a shared life and by providing each other with respect, equality, and mutual support, form a family. (Note: Spanish: El matrimonio es la unión jurídica de dos personas donde ambas, mediante una comunidad de vida, y procurándose respeto, igualdad y ayuda mutua, constituyan una familia.)

14 December 2021 vote in the Congress
Party	Voted for	Voted against	Abstained	Absent (Did not vote)
National Regeneration Movement	9: Priscila Benítez Sánchez; Violeta Cerrillo Ortiz; Víctor de la Torre Delgado; Armando Delgadillo Ruvalcaba; Maribel Galván Jiménez; Ernesto González Romo; Imelda Mauricio Esparza; Roxana Muñoz González; Sergio Ortega Rodríguez	–	–	1: Gabriela Pinedo Morales
Institutional Revolutionary Party	–	7: María Ávalos Márquez; Gabriela Basurto Ávila; Herminio Briones Oliva; José Estrada Hernández; Manuel Gallardo Sandoval; José González Hernández; Jehú Salas Dávila	–	–
National Action Party	–	3: José Correa Valdez; María del Mar de Ávila Ibargüengoytia; Karla Valdez Espinoza	–	–
Labor Party	3: Ana del Muro García; José Figueroa Rangel; José Ramírez Muñoz	–	–	–
Party of the Democratic Revolution	3: Enrique Laviada Cirerol; José Mendoza Maldonado; Gerardo Santa Cruz	–	–	–
New Alliance Party	1: Susana Barragán Espinosa	1: Martha Rodríguez Camarillo	–	–
Ecologist Green Party of Mexico	1: Georgia Miranda Herrera	–	–	–
Social Encounter Party	1: Zulema Santacruz Márquez	–	–	–
Total	18	11	0	1
Total	60.0%	36.7%	0.0%	3.3%

=== Municipalities issuing marriage licenses ===
Prior to the statewide legalization of same-sex marriage in December 2021, some municipalities issued marriage licenses to same-sex couples without the need to file an amparo. On 14 February 2019, officials in the city of Zacatecas announced they would begin issuing marriage licenses to same-sex couples. Governor Alejandro Tello Cristerna argued that the marriages would be "invalid" and expressed his personal opposition to the recognition of same-sex marriage, saying that authorities had to be "careful dealing with the topic". Bishop Sigifredo Noriega Barceló, who headed the Roman Catholic Diocese of Zacatecas, also stated his opposition, but nevertheless considered it necessary to find an alternative measure protecting the legal rights of same-sex couples without the "destruction of marriage". The first couple married on 23 February, and by 27 February another couple had married and five further couples had submitted marriage applications. The municipality of Cuauhtémoc followed suit in legalizing same-sex marriage on 1 March, and Villanueva on 18 May 2019. By 5 July 2019, Miguel Auza had also announced its intention to issue marriage licenses to same-sex couples, and on 1 July 2020 the city council of Fresnillo approved a motion to conduct same-sex marriages in the municipality by a 12–0 vote with 2 abstentions.

== Marriage statistics ==
The following table shows the number of same-sex marriages performed in Zacatecas since 2021 as reported by the National Institute of Statistics and Geography. The first same-sex marriage in Jerez de García Salinas took place in May 2022.

Number of marriages performed in Zacatecas
Year	Same-sex			Opposite-sex	Total	% same-sex
Year	Female	Male	Total	Opposite-sex	Total	% same-sex
2021	20	8	28	7,011	7,039	0.40%
2022	23	9	32	7,002	7,034	0.45%
2023	28	15	43	6,624	6,667	0.64%
2024	42	24	66	6,264	6,330	1.04%

== Public opinion ==
A 2017 opinion poll conducted by the Strategic Communication Office (Gabinete de Comunicación Estratégica) found that 46% of Zacatecas residents supported same-sex marriage, while 49% were opposed. According to a 2018 survey by the National Institute of Statistics and Geography, 37% of the Zacatecas public opposed same-sex marriage.

== See also ==
- LGBT rights in Mexico
- Same-sex marriage in Mexico
