= Recognition of same-sex unions in Cambodia =

Cambodia does not recognize same-sex marriage or civil unions, but recognizes a registry program known as the "declaration of family relationship" offering some limited legal rights to same-sex couples. By June 2021, this registry, which can serve as an evidence-based documentation of a relationship, had been introduced to 68 communes. Same-sex marriage has received support from King Norodom Sihamoni and his father, King Norodom Sihanouk, who expressed support after witnessing same-sex marriages in San Francisco in 2004.

The Constitution of Cambodia defines marriage as the union of "one husband and one wife". In 2023, the government suggested it would look into legalising same-sex marriage.

== Local initiatives ==
In 2018, the Rainbow Community Kampuchea (RoCK; Khmer: សហគមន៍ឥន្ទធនូកម្ពុជា, Sa'ha'kum 'Enthĕə'nuu Kampuciə) with the help of local authorities created a formal relationship registry program called the "Declaration of Family Relationship" (Khmer: សេចក្តីថ្លែងទំនាក់ទំនងគ្រួសារ, sackdəy thlaeng tumnĕək tumnɔɔng kruəsaa, pronounced [səcˈkɗej t̪ʰl̪aeŋ t̪umˈn̪eəʔ t̪umˈn̪ɔːŋ kruəˈsaː]). According to the RoCK, "the Declaration of Family Relationship is a civil contract between two people who are willing to be together and share responsibility taking care of the family, children and distribute the joint asset, as legal spouses do". It can serve as an evidence-based documentation of a relationship for same-sex couples; "Written in accordance with key elements of Cambodian civil law, the [Declaration] is legally non-binding but nonetheless creates an immediate and interim protective tool that same-sex couples can access despite not yet being able to legally marry under Cambodian law." By May 2018, the civil contract had been introduced to 50 communes in 15 provinces. This had increased to 68 communes in 20 provinces by June 2021, with 26 couples having signed the forms by that time. 32 couples had registered by October 2024.

== Same-sex marriage ==
Laws regarding homosexuality in Asia Same-sex sexual activity legal Marriage performed Marriage recognized Other type of partnership Unregistered cohabitation No recognition of same-sex couples Ambiguous Restriction on freedom of expression, not enforced Severe restriction of association with arrests or detention Same-sex sexual activity illegal Prison, not enforced Prison Death penalty on books, not enforced Enforced death penalty

=== Background ===
There is one recorded case of a legally valid same-sex civil marriage contracted in Cambodia. Khav Sokha and Pum Eth were married on 12 March 1995 in the village of Krabau, Kandal, where they are from. Sokha said in an interview with The Phnom Penh Post, "The authorities thought it was strange, but they agreed to tolerate it because I have three children already (from a previous marriage). They said that if we were both single (and childless), we would not be allowed to get married because we could not produce children". Thus, it was a fully acknowledged marriage, with official approval, and there "was not really any reaction to it". It was a popular event, with 250 people coming to the ceremony and partying, including Buddhist monks and high officials from the province. However, when a Cambodian-French same-sex couple attempted to marry in Kratié in February 2018, police prevented the wedding ceremony from taking place and arrested the couple.

=== Restrictions ===
In September 1993, the Constituent Assembly of Cambodia, a special body elected in 1993, drafted a new constitution for Cambodia. This Constitution defines marriage as the union of "one husband and one wife". Article 45 of the Constitution reads:

Marriage shall be conducted according to conditions determined by law based on the principle of mutual consent between one husband and one wife.

Article 3 of the Law on the Marriage and Family (ច្បាប់ស្ដីពីអាពាហ៍ពិពាហ៍និងគ្រួសារ, cbap sdəypii 'aapiə pipiə nɨng kruəsaa), enacted on 17 July 1989, reads: "A marriage is a solemn contract between a man and a woman in a spirit of love in accordance with the provisions of law and with the understanding that they cannot dissolve it as they please". The Civil Code also implies a married couple to be "husband and wife".

=== Attempts at legalization ===
After witnessing same-sex marriages being performed in San Francisco in 2004, King Norodom Sihanouk expressed support for legalizing same-sex unions in Cambodia. His son and successor, King Norodom Sihamoni, has also expressed support for same-sex marriage. Following the enactment of the Constitution of Nepal in September 2015, several governmental organisations and spokespeople expressed support for same-sex marriage and partnerships in Cambodia. The Minister of Interior, Sar Kheng, announced the possibility of pushing for the legalization of same-sex marriage. Government spokesman Phay Siphan expressed support for the LGBT community and said, "Cambodian society does not discriminate against LGBT people. It is only individuals who do so. No Cambodian laws discriminate against them, and nothing is banning them from loving each other or getting married". The Cambodian Government expressed a welcome reaction to the Nepal Constitution and announced the possibility of approving a same-sex marriage law. The Ministry of Women's Affairs also incorporated same-sex couples in its second National Action Plan to Prevent Violence Against Women 2014–2018. After the Taiwanese Constitutional Court ruled in May 2017 that banning same-sex marriage is unconstitutional in Taiwan, 43 civil society groups and trade unions called on the government to legalise same-sex marriage in Cambodia.

In May 2017, the Cambodia National Rescue Party (CNRP) announced it would hold a referendum on same-sex marriage if elected to government. The Khmer National United Party (KNUP) likewise said it would consider legalising same-sex marriage if it won the 2018 general election. Other parties that announced their support for same-sex marriage included FUNCINPEC, the League for Democracy Party (LDP) and the Grassroots Democracy Party (GDP). However, with the absence of a credible opposition, the elections were viewed as a formality and dismissed as sham elections by the international community. They resulted in a widely expected landslide victory for the ruling Cambodian People's Party (CPP), which won all 125 seats in the National Assembly. The CPP said it had no plans to legalise same-sex marriage, but was "open to considering it". In February 2019, Prime Minister Hun Sen said that the country was "not yet ready" to legalise same-sex marriage.

In 2019, the Cambodian Center for Human Rights released a report showing that discrimination against same-sex partners had decreased in Cambodia, but they still lacked major legal protections, namely same-sex marriage and adoption rights. The report stated that "80% percent of 'rainbow families' believe[d] that discrimination would be reduced if they were legally permitted to marry their partner. Excluding LGBT people from the institution of marriage excludes them from one of the foundations of Cambodian society." In response, government spokesman Phay Siphan said that the government supported same-sex partners and had facilitated couples with joint ownership of property. However, "amending the law must be line with Khmer traditions and customs", he said. At Cambodia's third Universal Periodic Review on 30 January 2019, Iceland, the Netherlands and Canada recommended the government to legalize same-sex marriage. On 5 July 2019, the government accepted these recommendations. It announced in January 2023 that it was reviewing the laws of countries where same-sex marriage is legal. In December 2023, LGBT activists and government representatives met to discuss the legalization of same-sex marriage, and suggested the formation of a joint working group to begin drafting legislation. On 13 February 2026, the Cambodian Human Rights Committee (CHRC) expressed support for same-sex marriage legalization, stating that "LGBTQ individuals must not be left behind". A CHRC spokesman noted that the first step would require amending the Constitution before a draft law recognising same-sex marriage could be introduced.

== Statistics ==
According to a 2018 report by the non-profit organization CamASEAN Youth's Future, there were about 6,000 same-sex couples in Cambodia. 2019 government figures showed that they were about 33,000 LGBT people in Cambodia, including about 5,000 cohabiting couples.

== Public opinion ==
In 2015, TNS Cambodia conducted a survey focusing on attitudes towards LGBT people in Cambodia. The sample was 1,563 people from 10 different provinces, (Note: These provinces were Phnom Penh (291), Kampong Cham (354), Siam Reap (201), Kampot (152), Battambang (147), Kandal (146), Ratanakiri (104), Pursat (53), Prey Veng (46), Svay Rieng (38) and Kampong Chhnang (31).) with 1,085 identifying as straight and 478 identifying as LGBT. 60% lived in rural areas, 24% in urban areas and 16% in semi-urban Phnom Penh. Support for same-sex marriage stood at 38% among straight people, while 42% were opposed and 20% were undecided. Among LGBT people, 94% supported same-sex marriage—from 96% among transgender women to 89% among gay men—and 3% were opposed. In total, 55% of respondents were in favour of same-sex marriage, 30% were opposed and 15% were undecided. The most frequent reasons for approval were "human rights" and "it is in their [LGBT people] nature", whereas opponents cited "against Khmer values and traditions" and "against human nature" as their most frequent reasons for disapproval.

A June–September 2022 Pew Research Center poll showed that 57% of Cambodians supported same-sex marriage (17% "strongly" and 40% "somewhat"), while 42% opposed (34% "strongly" and 8% "somewhat"). When divided by age, support was highest among 18–34-year-olds at 67% and lowest among those aged 35 and above at 48%. Women (62%) were also more likely to support same-sex marriage than men (50%). This level of support was the third highest among the six Southeast Asian countries polled, behind Vietnam at 65% and Thailand at 60%, but ahead of Singapore at 45%, Malaysia at 17%, and Indonesia at 5%.

== See also ==
- LGBT rights in Cambodia
- Recognition of same-sex unions in Asia
