= History of Myanmar Buddhist Women's Special Marriage Law =

During the British Colonial regime, the position of a non-Buddhist husband and Myanmar Buddhist wife was very unfavorable. While there is no provision in the Dhammathats that a Buddhist woman cannot marry another religious man, in this period, the Buddhist woman who married a non-Buddhist man almost lost her rights to divorce, inheritance, succession and their child's legal status. Almost all matters of divorce, inheritance, succession, partition and guardianship of children were decided by a foreign judge.

To protect Buddhist women who married non-Buddhist men, the Legislative Council passed that relating Act in 1939 (Myanmar Law Act No.24 of 1939). The Act came into force on 1 April 1941, but it was ineffective because of the 2nd World war. After independence, The Parliament of union padded the Myanmar Buddhist Women's Special Marriage and Succession Act, 1954 (Myanmar Act No.32 of 1954) which repealed the former 139 Act.

However, when the Myanmar Buddhist Women's Special Marriage and Succession Act, 1954 was passed, Myanmar Buddhist women who were married to non-Buddhist men did not receive relief from it because it had a lot of weaknesses. In order to provide effective legal protection to Myanmar Buddhist Women, Pyidaungsu Hluttaw passed Myanmar Buddhist Women Special Marriage Law, 2015 (PyiDaungSu Hluttaw Law No.50 of 2015) in 2015.

== Marriage to non-Buddhist ==
Having dealt with marriages in cases where both man and woman are Myanmar Buddhist, it is further necessary to examine the law as a Union in which one of the parties is of that nationality and faith.

Under the Myanmar regime all persons, whatsoever their race or creed, were governed by the Dhammathats, and since, by international law, marriage is decided by the law of the place where it is celebrated, it follows that the legal marriage according to Myanmar custom could have been contracted in Myanmar, before the annexation between Buddhist and adherents of other religions, and if the marriage was valid when contracted, it cannot have become invalid by any subsequent change of law, unless there had been a statuary provision invalidating such marriage.^{1}

== Ma Chain vs Ma Nyein case ==
Ma Chain vs Ma Nyein case was the first case of Myanmar Buddhist women who marry with Non-Buddhist men. In Thibaw regime, Myanmar Buddhist woman and Christian man married. While these two people were staying married, Myanmar was colonized by British. In 1872, The Christian Marriage Act was published by British. The Christian husband died after the Christian Marriage Act, 1872 was published. And his sister filed a suit that the Buddhist women was not unlawful wife according to the Christian Marriage Act, 1872 and she should not receive the right of ownership of the brother's property. But, the court decided that she was the legal wife because they married before the Christian Marriage Act, 1972 and she got the right of ownership of her husband's property.^{3}

After considering this case, the various decisions as regards mixed marriages has been to place Myanmar Buddhist women in a highly disadvantageous position.

== Religious marriage acts ==
In 1872, the British passed Christian Marriage Act, Hindu Marriage Act, Hindu Marriage Act, Mohammedan Marriage Act and so on. And, the court was decided by this laws. So, Myanmar Buddhist women who marry with Non-Buddhist men was highly disadvantaged position.

According to Hindu Marriage Act, a Hindu cannot contract a legal marriage with any woman unless she belongs to his own caste; hence a Hindu of the Brahmins, Kshatriya, and Vaishya or Oudra caste cannot contract a valid marriage in the orthodox style with a Myanmar Buddhist.^{4}

If Myanmar Buddhist women want to marry with Mohammedan husband, their marriage is invalid unless the latter embraces the Mohammedan faith or any other revealed religion believing in one God and the marriage is celebrated according to the rites of the Mohammedan faith.^{5}

And, Myanmar Buddhist women was also suffered in Sino-Myanmar marriage. A Chinese Buddhist can contract valid marriage with a Myanmar Buddhist as regard the requisites of such a marriage the law has passed through different stages. At first the law required that the marriage should be celebrated not only according to Myanmar custom but also according to Chinese custom. If the Chinese custom could not celebrate while they married, their marriage is invalid.

But, Myanmar Buddhist women can marry freely with her consent according to the Myanmar customary law but other religious customary laws restricted their marriage. Thus, most of Myanmar Buddhist women came into unlawful wives and lesser wives.

== The Myanmar Buddhist Women's Special Marriage and Succession Act, 1939 ==
In 1939, there was a races conflicts because of political, economic and religious. And the nationalist aware Myanmar Buddhist Women suffering. The Buddhist woman who married non-Buddhist man almost lost her rights of divorce, inheritance, succession and their child's legal status. All matters of divorce, inheritance, succession, partition and guardianship of children were mostly decided by the foreign judge. It was unequitable and injustice to Buddhist women.

To protect those matters of Buddhist woman who enter into contract to marry with non-Buddhist man, the Legislative Council passed that relating Act in 1939 Myanmar Law Act No.24 of 1939). The Act came into force on 1 April 1941 but it was unaffected because of the existence of the 2nd World war.

== The Myanmar Buddhist Women's Special Marriage and Succession Marriage Act, 1954 ==
However, The Myanmar Buddhist Women's Special Marriage and Succession Marriage Act, 1939 was enacted by Legislative Council, it was unaffected. So, the position of non-Buddhist husband's Myanmar Buddhist wife was still very unfavorable to her.

War and military occupation prevented the Act from coming into full play in Myanmar, and a new Act was drafted and passed in Myanmar language by Parliament in 1954. Certain improvement were also introduced into the Act to provide for the better interest of the Buddhist woman.

According to The Buddhist Women's Special Marriage and Succession Act 1954, it determined to govern the marriage between Myanmar Buddhist and non-Buddhist man to safeguard the rights of Buddhist women's entitled under Myanmar Customary Law in the case of a marriage i.e. between Myanmar Buddhist. And proprietary rights, rights of inheritance, divorce, partition on Divorce and Guardianship of Children all are governed by Myanmar Customary Law.

One of the most important question of law occurred regarding the status of wives to establish under the Act in the case of Mrs.Marry Wain vs. Daw Kyi Kyi^{6} is that

U Htin Wain, Christian, having two wives, one wife a Christian and another wife a Buddhist living together over ten years as husband and wife.

In that case U Htin Wain and Mrs.Marry Wain are Christians married under the Christian Marriage Act. When U Htin Wain expired, Daw Kyi Kyi filed as suit that she is the legal wife of U Htin Wain and had a right to inherit together with the first wife, Mrs.Marry Wain.

Mrs.Marry Wain contended that under the Christian Marriage Act, there is only a monogamous marriage tie subsisted, so that Daw Kyi Kyi has no right to inherit as a legal wife.

But the Chief Court decided that Daw Kyi Kyi has the right to inherit together with Mrs.Marry Wain from the deceased U Htin Wain's property. According to Myanmar Customary Law, the share to be inherited by Daw Kyi Kyi is one-half of the "Lettetpwa" property during their marriage and one-third of the "Atetper" property during the marriage of U Hitn Wain and Mrs.Marry Wain.

Thus, the status of wives of non-Buddhist husband under the 1954 Special Act was almost equaled footing among themselves. But, some of the wives of non-Buddhist husband was still very unfavorable because of the weakness of law.

== Myanmar Buddhist Women's Special Marriage Law, 2015 ==
However Myanmar Buddhist Women's Special Marriage and Succession Act (1954) had affected, most of the Myanmar Buddhist Women did not know it.^{7}They thought that if they married non-Buddhist man, they needed to change their husband religion. In that of doing so, they may be legal wife. So, a group of nationalist monk group called "The Association for the Protection of Race and Religion" and their followers demanded to protect Myanmar Buddhist Women. To give effective of legal protection for Myanmar Buddhist Women, PyiDaungSu Hluttaw passed this law in 2015. This law came into force on 26 August 2015. It was written for Myanmar Buddhist Women who marry man from other religions so they have equal rights in marriage, divorce, inheritance and taking care of children as well as have effective protection.
