= Same-sex marriage =

Marriage of persons of the same sex or gender

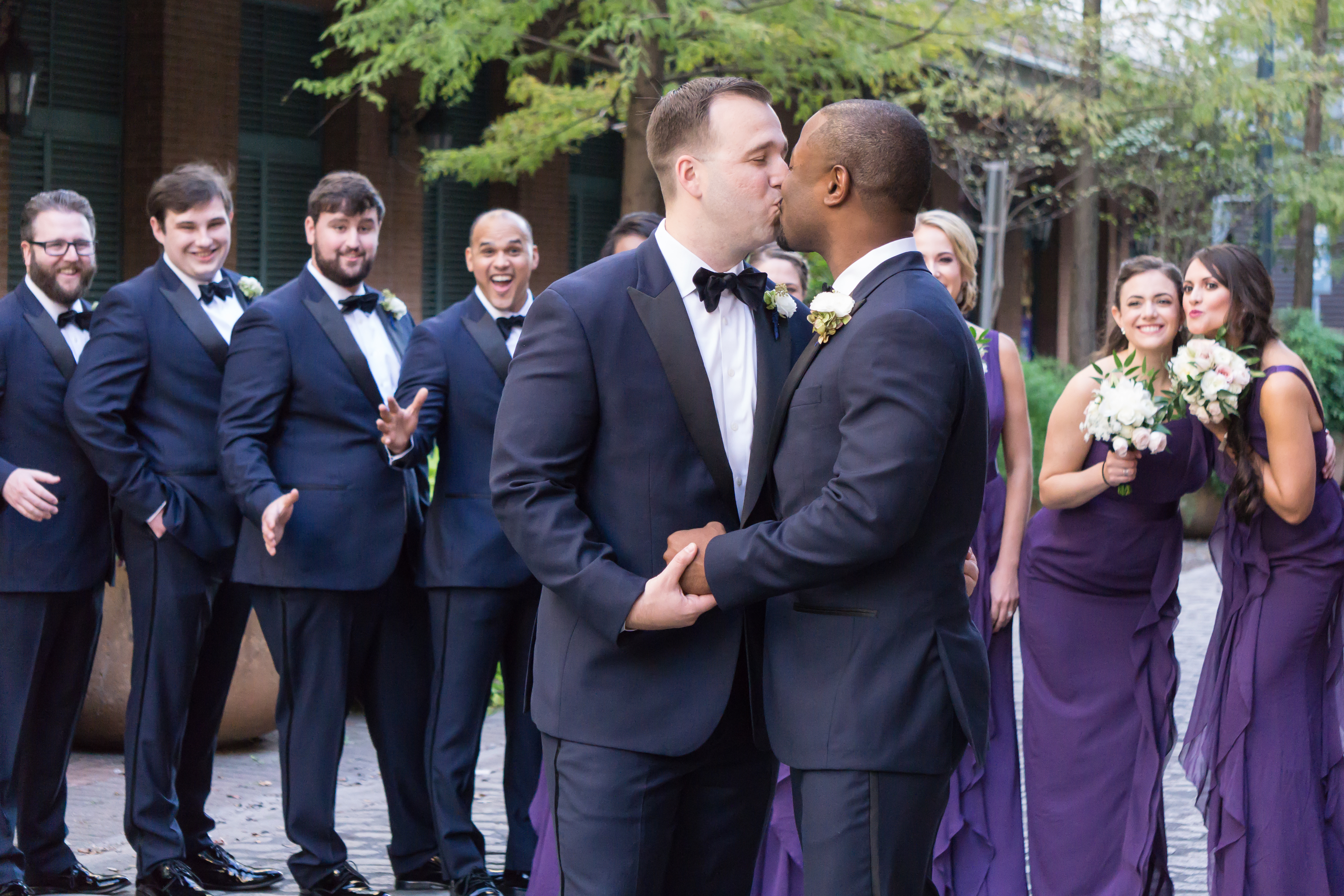
Two men marry, surrounded by wedding party, in New Orleans, United States on 11 November 2017

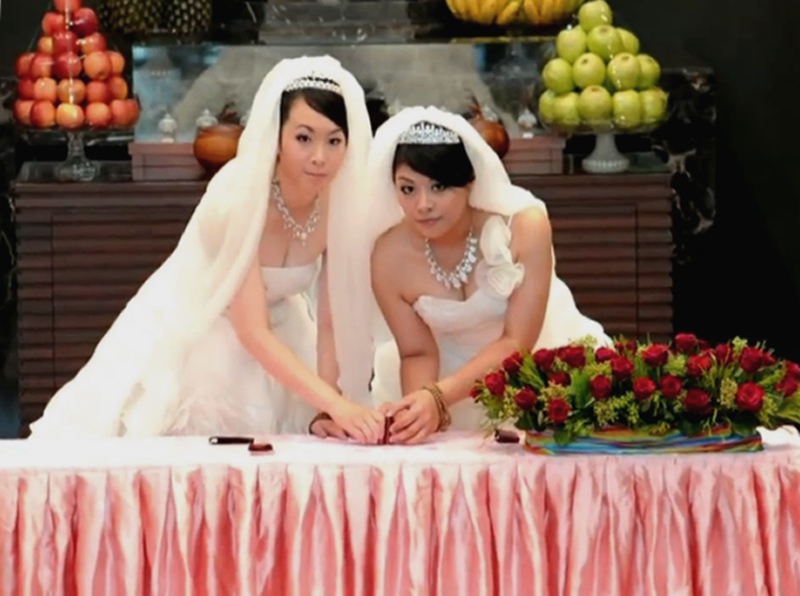
A same-sex marriage between two women in Taiwan

Same-sex marriage, also known as gay marriage or same-gender marriage, is the marriage of two people of the same legal sex or gender. As of 2026, marriage between same-sex couples is legally performed and recognized in 38 countries, with a total population of 1.5 billion people (20% of the world's population). The most recent jurisdiction to legalize same-sex marriage is Thailand; legalization has also been mandated for Nepal.

Same-sex marriage is legally recognized in a majority of the world's developed countries and across much of the Western world. Most jurisdictions which allow same-sex marriage also grant adoption rights to those couples. Some countries, such as Nigeria and Russia, restrict advocacy for same-sex marriage. A few of these are among the 35 countries (as of 2023) that constitutionally define marriage as being between couples of the opposite sex, with most of those provisions enacted in recent decades as a preventative measure.

In Europe, there are records of marriage between men dating back to the first century. Jack Baker and Michael McConnell are the first same-sex couple in modern recorded history known to obtain a marriage license, have their marriage solemnized, which occurred on September 3, 1971, in Minnesota, and have it legally recognized by any form of government. The first law providing for marriage equality between same-sex and opposite-sex couples was passed in the continental Netherlands in 2000 and took effect on 1 April 2001. The application of marriage law equally to same-sex and opposite-sex couples has varied by jurisdiction, and has come about through legislative change to marriage law, court rulings based on constitutional guarantees of equality, recognition that marriage of same-sex couples is allowed by existing marriage law, and by direct popular vote, such as through referendums and initiatives. The most prominent supporters of same-sex marriage are the world's major medical and scientific communities, human rights and civil rights organizations, and some progressive religious groups, while its most prominent opponents are from conservative religious groups (some of which nonetheless support same-sex civil unions providing legal protections for same-sex couples). Polls consistently show continually rising support for the recognition of same-sex marriage in most developed democracies and in many developing countries.

Scientific studies show that the financial, psychological, and physical well-being of gay people is enhanced by marriage, and that the children of same-sex parents benefit from being raised by married same-sex couples within a marital union that is recognized by law and supported by societal institutions. At the same time, no harm is done to the institution of marriage among heterosexuals. Social science research indicates that the exclusion of same-sex couples from marriage stigmatizes and invites public discrimination against gay and lesbian people, with research repudiating the notion that either civilization or viable social orders depend upon restricting marriage to heterosexuals. Same-sex marriage can provide those in committed same-sex relationships with relevant government services and make financial demands on them comparable to that required of those in opposite-sex marriages, and also gives them legal protections such as inheritance and hospital visitation rights. Opposition is often based on religious teachings, such as the view that marriage is meant to be between one man and one woman, and that procreation is the natural goal of marriage. Other forms of opposition are based on claims such as that homosexuality is unnatural and abnormal, that the recognition of same-sex unions will promote homosexuality in society, and that children are better off when raised by opposite-sex couples. These claims are refuted by scientific studies, which show that homosexuality is a natural and normal variation in human sexuality, that sexual orientation is not a choice, and that children of same-sex couples fare just as well as the children of opposite-sex couples.

== Terminology ==
=== Alternative terms ===
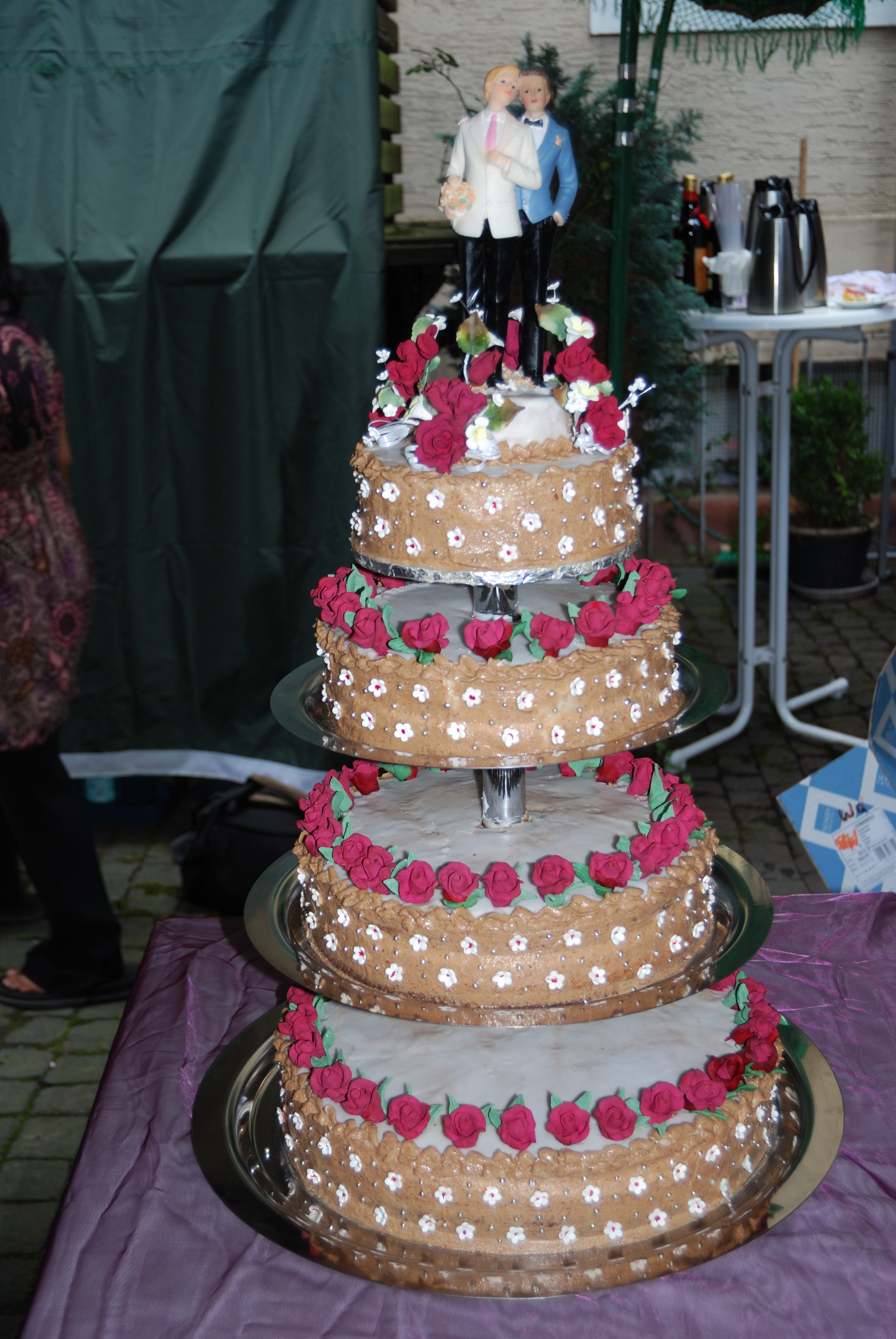
Wedding cake of a same sex marriage

Some proponents of the legal recognition of same-sex marriage—such as Marriage Equality USA (founded in 1998), Freedom to Marry (founded in 2003), Canadians for Equal Marriage, and Marriage for All Japan—used the terms marriage equality and equal marriage to signal that their goal was for same-sex marriage to be recognized on equal ground with opposite-sex marriage. The Associated Press recommends the use of same-sex marriage over gay marriage. A further move to more inclusive language has been the shift from same-sex relationship to same-gender relationship, and similarly to same-gender marriage to not restrict individuals within the relationship by sexual orientation, as gender identity is a spectrum and noting that historical terms excluded members of the LGBTQ+ community and were forms of bisexual or transgender erasure.

=== Use of the term marriage ===
Anthropologists have struggled to determine a definition of marriage that absorbs commonalities of the social construct across cultures around the world. Many proposed definitions have been criticized for failing to recognize the existence of same-sex marriage in some cultures, including those of more than 30 African peoples, such as the Kikuyu and Nuer.

With several countries revising their marriage laws to recognize same-sex couples in the 21st century, all major English dictionaries have revised their definition of the word marriage to either drop gender specifications or supplement them with secondary definitions to include gender-neutral language or explicit recognition of same-sex unions. The Oxford English Dictionary has recognized same-sex marriage since 2000.

Opponents of same-sex marriage who want marriage to be restricted to pairings of one man and one woman, such as the Church of Jesus Christ of Latter-day Saints, the Catholic Church, and the Southern Baptist Convention, use the term traditional marriage to mean opposite-sex marriage.

== History ==
=== Ancient ===
The Book of Leviticus prohibited homosexual relations, and the Hebrews were warned not to "follow the acts of the land of Egypt or the acts of the land of Canaan" (Lev. 18:22, 20:13). A reference to marriage between same-sex couples appears in the Rabbinic literature Sifra, which was written between 200 to 300 CE. The Sifra clarifies what it calls ambiguous acts, and that they included marriage between same-sex couples: "A man would marry a man and a woman a woman, a man would marry a woman and her daughter, and a woman would be married to two men."

A few scholars believe that in the early Roman Empire some male couples were celebrating traditional marriage rites in the presence of friends. Male–male weddings are reported by sources that mock them; the feelings of the participants are not recorded. Various ancient sources state that the emperor Nero celebrated two public weddings with males, once taking the role of the bride (with a freedman Pythagoras), and once the groom (with Sporus); there may have been a third in which he was the bride. In the early 3rd century AD, the emperor Elagabalus is reported to have been the bride in a wedding to his male partner. Other mature men at his court had husbands, or said they had husbands in imitation of the emperor. Roman law did not recognize marriage between males, but one of the grounds for disapproval expressed in Juvenal's satire is that celebrating the rites would lead to expectations for such marriages to be registered officially. As the empire was becoming Christianized in the 4th century, legal prohibitions against marriage between males began to appear.

In 17th century China, writer Li Yu and scholar-bureaucrat Shen Defu wrote about a system of male marriages in the Fujian region. The older man in the union would play the masculine role as a qixiong or "adoptive older brother", paying a "bride price" to the family of the younger man—it was said virgins fetched higher prices—who became the qidi, or "adoptive younger brother". Li Yu described the ceremony, "They do not skip the three cups of tea or the six wedding rituals- it is just like a proper marriage with a formal wedding."

=== Contemporary ===
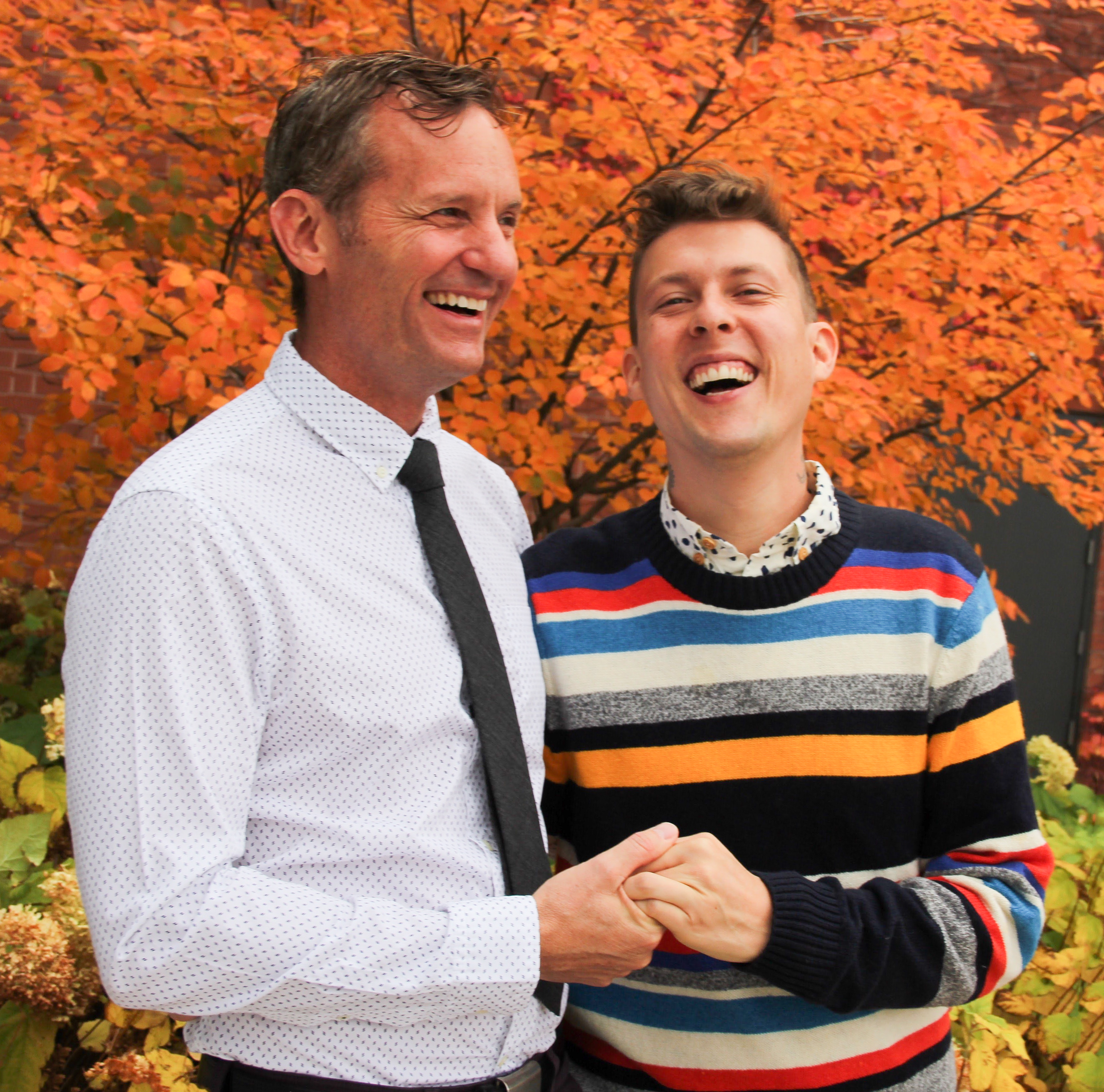
Newly married couple in Minnesota shortly after the federal legalization of same-sex marriage in the United States, 2015

Michael McConnell and Jack Baker are the first same sex couple in modern recorded history known to obtain a marriage license, have their marriage solemnized, which occurred on September 3, 1971, in Minnesota, and have it legally recognized by any form of government. Historians variously trace the beginning of the modern movement in support of same-sex marriage to anywhere from around the 1980s to the 1990s. During the 1980s in the United States, the AIDS epidemic led to increased attention on the legal aspects of same-sex relationships. Andrew Sullivan made the first case for same sex marriage in a major American journal in 1989, published in The New Republic.

In 1989, Denmark became the first country to legally recognize a relationship for same-sex couples, establishing registered partnerships, which gave those in same-sex relationships "most rights of married heterosexuals, but not the right to adopt or obtain joint custody of a child". In 2001, the continental Netherlands became the first country to broaden marriage laws to include same-sex couples. Since then, same-sex marriage has been established by law in 38 other countries, including most of the Americas and Western Europe. However, its spread has been uneven — South Africa is the only country in Africa to take the step; Taiwan and Thailand are the only ones in Asia.

As of 2026, Bermuda is the first and only jurisdiction in the world that formally legalized same-sex marriage and where that legalization is now repealed.

== Timeline ==
The summary table below lists the jurisdictions which have legalized same-sex marriage, in chronological order. As of 2025, 38 states have legalized in some capacity.

Dates are when marriages between same-sex couples began to be officially certified, or when local laws were passed if marriages were not already legal under higher authority.

2001	Netherlands (1 April)
2002	
2003	Belgium (1 June); Ontario (10 June); British Columbia (8 July)
2004	Quebec (19 March); Massachusetts (17 May); Yukon (14 July); Manitoba (16 September); Nova Scotia (24 September); Saskatchewan (5 November); Newfoundland and Labrador (21 December)
2005	New Brunswick (23 June); Spain (3 July); Canada [nationwide] (20 July)
2006	South Africa (30 November)
2007	
2008	California (June 16, repealed November 5); Connecticut (12 November)
2009	Norway (1 January); Iowa (27 April); Sweden (1 May); Coquille Indian Tribe (20 May); Vermont (1 September)
2010	New Hampshire (1 January); District of Columbia (3 March); Mexican Federal District (4 March); Mashantucket Pequot Tribal Nation (29 April); Portugal (5 June); Iceland (27 June); Argentina (22 July)
2011	New York (24 July); Suquamish Tribe (1 August); Alagoas (7 December)
2012	Quintana Roo (3 May); Denmark (15 June); Sergipe (5 July); Santa Rita do Sapucaí, Minas Gerais (11 July); Espírito Santo (15 August); Bonaire, Sint Eustatius and Saba (10 October); Bahia (26 November); Brazilian Federal District (1 December); Washington (6 December); Port Gamble S'Klallam Tribe (9 December); Piauí (15 December); Maine (29 December)
2013	Maryland (1 January); São Paulo (16 February); Ceará (15 March); Little Traverse Bay Bands of Odawa Indians (15 March); Paraná (26 March); Mato Grosso do Sul (2 April); Rondônia (26 April); Santa Catarina (29 April); Paraíba (29 April); Pokagon Band of Potawatomi Indians (8 May); Brazil [nationwide] (16 May); France (18 May); Iipay Nation of Santa Ysabel (24 June); California (28 June); Delaware (1 July); Minnesota (1 August); Rhode Island (1 August); Grand Portage Band of Chippewa (1 August); Uruguay (5 August); New Zealand (19 August); Doña Ana County, New Mexico (21 August); Santa Fe County, New Mexico (23 August); Bernalillo County, New Mexico (26 August); San Miguel County, New Mexico (27 August); Valencia County, New Mexico (27 August); Taos County, New Mexico (28 August); Los Alamos County, New Mexico (4 September); Confederated Tribes of the Colville Reservation (5 September); Grant County, New Mexico (9 September); Cheyenne and Arapaho Tribes (18 October); New Jersey (21 October); Blue Lake Rancheria (1 November); Leech Lake Band of Ojibwe (15 November); Hawaii (2 December); New Mexico [statewide] (19 December); Utah (20 December, repealed 6 January 2014)
2014	Cook County, Illinois (21 February); England and Wales (13 March); South Georgia and the South Sandwich Islands (13 March); Oregon (19 May); Pennsylvania (20 May); Illinois [statewide] (1 June); Akrotiri and Dhekelia (3 June); British Indian Ocean Territory (3 June); Puyallup Tribe of Indians (9 July); Fond du Lac Band of Lake Superior Chippewa (16 July); Confederated Tribes of Coos, Lower Umpqua and Siuslaw Indians (10 August); Coahuila (17 September); Oklahoma (6 October); Virginia (6 October); Utah (6 October); Indiana (6 October); Wisconsin (6 October); Lac du Flambeau Band of Lake Superior Chippewa (6 October); Colorado (7 October); West Virginia (9 October); Nevada (9 October); Fort McDermitt Paiute and Shoshone Tribes (9 October); North Carolina (10 October); Alaska (12 October); Idaho (15 October); Arizona (17 October); Fort McDowell Yavapai Nation (17 October); Pascua Yaqui Tribe (17 October); Salt River Pima-Maricopa Indian Community (17 October); San Carlos Apache Tribe (17 October); Yavapai-Apache Nation (17 October); Wyoming (21 October); St. Louis, Missouri (5 November); St. Louis County, Missouri (6 November); Jackson County, Missouri (7 November); Douglas County, Kansas (12 November); Sedgwick County, Kansas (12 November); Eastern Shoshone Tribe (14 November); Northern Arapaho Tribe (14 November); Montana (19 November); Blackfeet Nation (19 November); South Carolina (20 November); Keweenaw Bay Indian Community (13 December); Scotland (16 December)
2015	Luxembourg (1 January); Miami-Dade County, Florida (5 January); Florida [statewide] (6 January); Central Council of the Tlingit and Haida Indian Tribes of Alaska (24 February); Pitcairn Islands (14 May); Confederated Tribes of Siletz Indians (15 May); Guam (9 June); Oneida Tribe of Indians of Wisconsin (10 June); Chihuahua (12 June); United States [nationwide] (26 June); Northern Mariana Islands (30 June); Sault Ste. Marie Tribe of Chippewa Indians (7 July); United States Virgin Islands (9 July); Puerto Rico (13 July); Santiago de Querétaro, Querétaro (21 July); Hannahville Indian Community (3 August); White Mountain Apache Tribe (9 September); (Republic of Ireland) Ireland (16 November); Confederated Tribes of the Grand Ronde Community of Oregon (18 November); Nayarit (23 December)
2016	Stockbridge-Munsee Community Band of Mohican Indians (2 February); Greenland (1 April); Colombia (28 April); Tulalip Tribes of Washington (6 May); Jalisco [statewide] (12 May); Campeche (20 May); Colima (12 June); Michoacán (23 June); Morelos (5 July); Isle of Man (22 July); San Pedro Cholula, Puebla (18 September); British Antarctic Territory (13 October); Menominee Indian Tribe of Wisconsin (3 November); Cherokee Nation (9 December); Gibraltar (15 December)
2017	Ascension Island (1 January); Amealco de Bonfil, Querétaro (4 January); Cadereyta de Montes, Querétaro (4 January); Ezequiel Montes, Querétaro (4 January); Huimilpan, Querétaro (4 January); Pedro Escobedo, Querétaro (4 January); San Joaquín, Querétaro (4 January); Tolimán, Querétaro (4 January); Finland (1 March); Osage Nation (20 March); Prairie Island Indian Community (22 March); Falkland Islands (29 April); Guernsey (2 May); Bermuda (5 May, repealed 1 June 2018); Ho-Chunk Nation of Wisconsin (5 June); Faroe Islands (1 July); Tristan da Cunha (4 August); Malta (1 September); Germany (1 October); Ak-Chin Indian Community (25 October); Baja California (3 November); Australia (9 December); Saint Helena (20 December)
2018	Puebla [statewide] (16 February); Chiapas (11 May); Alderney (14 June); Jersey (1 July); Oaxaca (26 August); Ponca Tribe of Nebraska (27 August); Bermuda (23 November, repealed 14 March 2022)
2019	Austria (1 January); Zacatecas, Zacatecas (14 February); Cuauhtémoc, Zacatecas (1 March); Villanueva, Zacatecas (20 May); San Luis Potosí (21 May); Taiwan (24 May); Nuevo León (31 May); Hidalgo (11 June); Baja California Sur (29 June); Miguel Auza, Zacatecas (by 5 July); Ecuador (8 July); Oglala Sioux Tribe (8 July); Bay Mills Indian Community (8 July); Colorado River Indian Tribes (8 August); Aguascalientes (16 August)
2020	Northern Ireland [final jurisdiction in the United Kingdom] (13 January); Sark (23 April); Costa Rica (26 May); Fresnillo, Zacatecas (3 July); Turtle Mountain Band of Chippewa Indians (6 August); Tlaxcala (25 December)
2021	Sinaloa (30 June); Sonora (22 October); Querétaro [statewide] (13 November); Guanajuato (20 December); Zacatecas [statewide] (30 December)
2022	Yucatán (4 March); Chile (10 March); Winnebago Tribe of Nebraska (11 April); Chickasaw Nation (18 April); Grand Traverse Band of Ottawa and Chippewa Indians (25 May); Veracruz (13 June); Switzerland (1 July); Slovenia (8 or 9 July); Durango (19 September); Cuba (27 September); Tabasco (27 October); State of Mexico (2 November); Tamaulipas (19 November); Saint Regis Mohawk Tribe (21 December); Guerrero [statewide; final jurisdiction in Mexico] (31 December)
2023	Andorra (17 February); Nottawaseppi Huron Band of Potawatomi (16 March); Choctaw Nation (23 May)
2024	Estonia (1 January); Greece (16 February); Aruba (12 July); Curaçao (12 July)
2025	Liechtenstein (1 January); Thailand (23 January)
2026	

== Same-sex marriage around the world ==
Same-sex marriage is legally performed and recognized in 38 countries: Andorra, Argentina, Australia, (Note: Same-sex marriage is performed and recognized by law in continental Australia and in the non-self-governing possessions of Norfolk Island, Christmas Island and the Cocos Islands, which follow Australian law.) Austria, Belgium, Brazil, Canada, Chile, Colombia, Costa Rica, Cuba, Denmark, (Note: Same-sex marriage is performed and recognized by law in continental Denmark, the Faroe Islands and Greenland, which together make up the Realm of Denmark.) Ecuador, (Note: Same-sex marriage is performed and recognized throughout Ecuador, but such couples are not considered married for purposes of adoption and may not adopt children.) Estonia, Finland, France, (Note: Same-sex marriage is performed and recognized by law in metropolitan France and in all French overseas regions and possessions, which follow a single legal code.) Germany, Greece, Iceland, Ireland, Liechtenstein, Luxembourg, Malta, Mexico, (Note: Same-sex marriage is available in all jurisdictions, though the process is not everywhere as straightforward as it is for opposite-sex marriage and does not always include adoption rights.) the Netherlands, (Note: Same-sex marriage is performed and recognized by law in the continental Netherlands, the Caribbean municipalities of Bonaire, Sint Eustatius and Saba, and the constituent countries of Aruba and Curaçao, but not in Sint Maarten.) New Zealand, (Note: Same-sex marriage is performed and recognized by law in New Zealand proper, but not in its possession of Tokelau, nor in the Cook Islands and Niue, which make up the Realm of New Zealand.) Norway, Portugal, Slovenia, South Africa, Spain, Sweden, Switzerland, Taiwan, Thailand, the United Kingdom, (Note: Same-sex marriage is performed and recognized by law in all parts of the United Kingdom and in its non-American possessions, but not in its American possessions, namely Anguilla, Bermuda, the British Virgin Islands, the Cayman Islands, Montserrat and the Turks and Caicos Islands.) the United States, (Note: Same-sex marriage is performed and recognized by law in all fifty states of the US and in the District of Columbia, in all overseas territories except American Samoa (recognition only), and in all tribal nations that do not have their own marriage laws, as well as in most nations that do. The largest of the dozen or so tribal nations that do not perform or recognize same-sex marriage are Navajo, Gila River and perhaps Yakama, and the largest (or perhaps only) among the shared-sovereignty Oklahoma Tribal Statistical Areas are the Creek, Citizen Potawatomi and Seminole. These polities ban same-sex marriage and do not recognize marriages from other jurisdictions, though members may still marry under state law and be accorded all the rights of marriage under state and federal law.) and Uruguay. Same-sex marriage performed remotely or abroad is recognized with full marital rights by Israel.

Marriage open to same-sex couples Same-sex marriage recognized with full rights when performed remotely or abroad Legislation or binding domestic court ruling establishing same-sex marriage, but marriage is not yet provided for Civil unions or domestic partnerships Unregistered cohabitation or legal guardianship Nonbinding certification Limited recognition of marriage performed in certain other jurisdictions (residency rights for spouses) Country subject to an international court ruling for limited recognition of marriage performed in certain other jurisdictions No legal recognition of same-sex unions

The Bolivian constitutional court granted a couple the legal right to marry in that country, but the option is not generally available. Same-sex marriage has been mandated by the Supreme Court of Nepal, but marriages are recorded in a separate register and not recognized by the government.

Civil unions are being considered in the Philippines.

On 12 March 2015, the European Parliament passed a non-binding resolution encouraging EU institutions and member states to "[reflect] on the recognition of same-sex marriage or same-sex civil union as a political, social and human and civil rights issue".

In response to the international spread of same-sex marriage, a number of countries have enacted preventative constitutional bans, with the most recent being Gabon in 2024. In other countries, such restrictions and limitations are effected through legislation. Even before same-sex marriage was first legislated, some countries had constitutions that specified that marriage was between one man and one woman.

Same-sex marriage banned by secular constitution Same-sex marriage banned by constitutionally mandated religious law No constitutional ban

=== International court rulings ===
==== European Court of Human Rights ====
In 2010, the European Court of Human Rights (ECHR) ruled in Schalk and Kopf v Austria, a case involving an Austrian same-sex couple who were denied the right to marry. The court found, by a vote of 4 to 3, that their human rights had not been violated. The court further stated that same-sex unions are not protected under art. 12 of ECHR ("Right to marry"), which exclusively protects the right to marry of opposite-sex couples (without regard if the sex of the partners is the result of birth or of sex change), but they are protected under art. 8 of ECHR ("Right to respect for private and family life") and art. 14 ("Prohibition of discrimination").

Article 12 of the European Convention on Human Rights states that: "Men and women of marriageable age have the right to marry and to found a family, according to the national laws governing the exercise of this right", not limiting marriage to those in a heterosexual relationship. However, the ECHR stated in Schalk and Kopf v Austria that this provision was intended to limit marriage to heterosexual relationships, as it used the term "men and women" instead of "everyone". Nevertheless, the court accepted and is considering cases concerning same-sex marriage recognition, e.g. Andersen v Poland. In 2021, the court ruled in Fedotova and Others v. Russia—followed by later judgements concerning other member states—that countries must provide some sort of legal recognition to same-sex couples, although not necessarily marriage.

==== European Union ====
On 5 June 2018, the European Court of Justice ruled, in Coman and Others v General Inspectorate for Immigration and Ministry of the Interior, that, under the specific conditions of the couple in question, married same-sex couples have the same residency rights as other married couples in an EU country, even if that country does not permit or recognize same-sex marriage. However, the ruling was not implemented in Romania, and on 14 September 2021 the European Parliament passed a resolution calling on the European Commission to ensure that the ruling is respected across the EU.

On 25 November 2025, the European Court of Justice established that all EU Member States must recognize same-sex marriages legally performed in other EU countries for other purposes, expanding on the Coman case. The key provisions of the ruling are:

- Member States are required to recognize a marriage lawfully contracted in another Member State where at least one spouse is an EU citizen exercising their right to freedom of movement and residence.
- This recognition is mandatory for the purpose of exercising rights conferred by EU law, such as residency, tax benefits, inheritance, and social security.
- If a Member State provides a procedure for recognizing foreign marriages through registration (e.g., in Poland the term transcription, or transkrypcja, is used to enter a marriage contracted abroad into a civil register), it must apply that procedure equally to same-sex couples. It cannot refuse transcription solely because domestic law does not permit same-sex marriage.

However, the ruling does not require Member States to legalize same-sex marriage within their own domestic legal systems. It only mandates the recognition of marriages validly concluded elsewhere in the EU. The following EU countries, which previously did not recognize same-sex marriages, are directly affected by this ruling: Bulgaria, Croatia, Cyprus, Czechia, Hungary, Italy, Latvia, Lithuania, Poland, Romania and Slovakia.

==== Inter-American Court of Human Rights ====
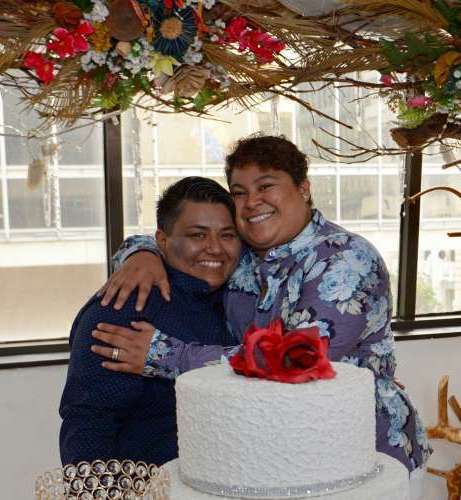
Alexandra Chávez and Michelle Avilés, the first same-sex couple to marry in Ecuador

On 8 January 2018, the Inter-American Court of Human Rights (IACHR) issued an advisory opinion that states party to the American Convention on Human Rights should grant same-sex couples accession to all existing domestic legal systems of family registration, including marriage, along with all rights that derive from marriage. The Court recommended that governments issue temporary decrees recognizing same-sex marriage until new legislation is brought in. They also said that it was inadmissible and discriminatory for a separate legal provision to be established (such as civil unions) instead of same-sex marriage.

== Other arrangements ==
=== Civil unions ===
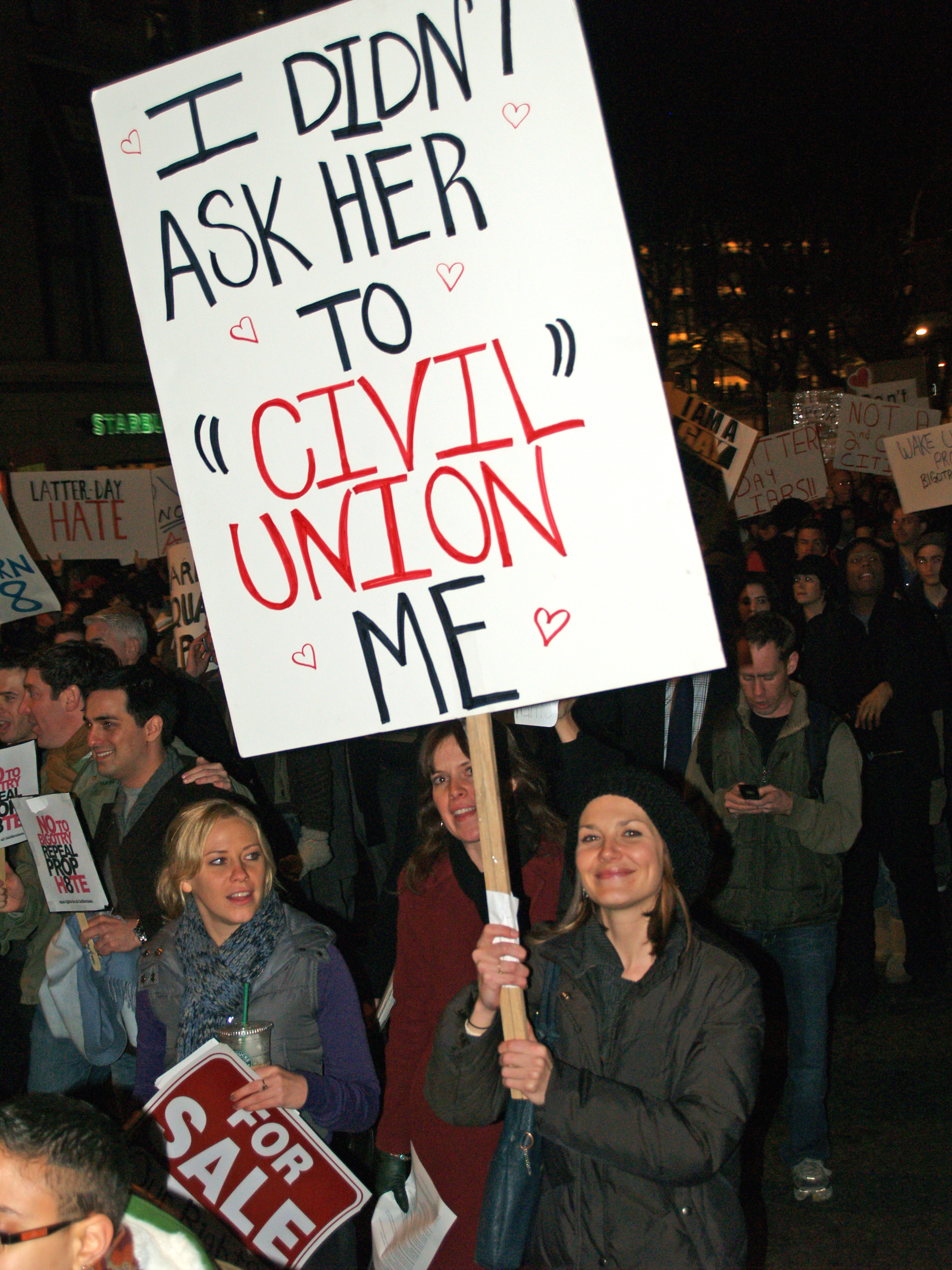
Many advocates, such as this November 2008 protester at a demonstration in New York City against California Proposition 8, reject the notion of civil unions, describing them as inferior to the legal recognition of same-sex marriage.

Civil union, civil partnership, domestic partnership, registered partnership, unregistered partnership, and unregistered cohabitation statuses offer varying legal benefits of marriage. As of 22 November 2026, countries that have an alternative form of legal recognition other than marriage on a national level are: Bolivia, Croatia, Cyprus, the Czech Republic, Hungary, Italy, Latvia, Lithuania, Monaco, Montenegro and San Marino. Same-sex marriage performed remotely or abroad is recognized with full marital rights by Israel. Additionally, various jurisdictions in Cambodia, Japan and the Philippines offer same-sex couples varying levels of benefits, which include hospital visitation rights and others.

Additionally, eighteen countries that have legally recognized same-sex marriage also have an alternative form of recognition for same-sex couples, usually available to heterosexual couples as well: Argentina, Australia, Austria, Belgium, Brazil, Chile, Colombia, Ecuador, France, Greece, Luxembourg, Malta, the Netherlands, Portugal, South Africa, Spain, the United Kingdom and Uruguay.

They are also available in parts of the United States (Arizona, (Note: Legally available in the Arizona municipalities of Bisbee, Clarkdale, Cottonwood, Jerome, Sedona and Tucson.) California, Colorado, Hawaii, Illinois, New Jersey, Nevada and Oregon) and Canada.

=== Non-sexual same-sex marriage ===
==== Kenya ====
Female same-sex marriage is practiced among the Gikuyu, Nandi, Kamba, Kipsigis, and to a lesser extent neighboring peoples. About 5–10% of women are in such marriages. However, this is not seen as homosexual, but is instead a way for families without sons to keep their inheritance within the family.

==== Nigeria ====
Among the Igbo people and probably other peoples in the south of the country, there are circumstances where a marriage between women is considered appropriate, such as when a woman has no child and her husband dies, and she takes a wife to perpetuate her inheritance and family lineage.

== Religion and same-sex marriage ==
=== Christianity ===
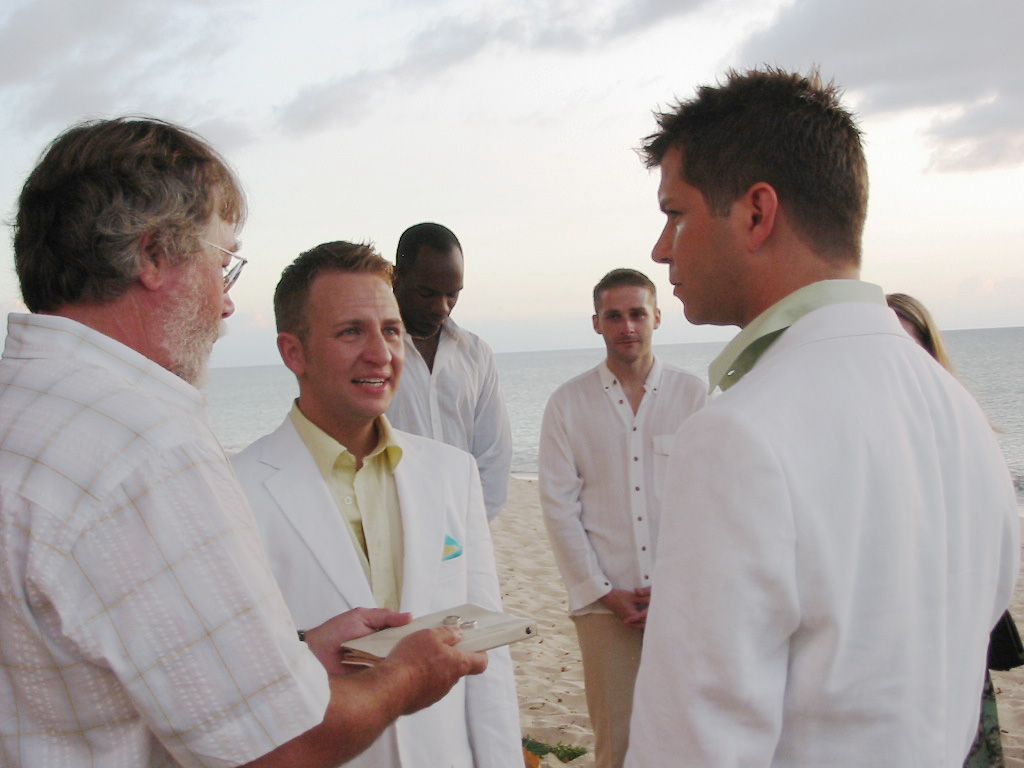
Marriage of two men celebrated by a Christian pastor in the United States.

Some progressive Christian denominations allow local churches to decide whether to bless same-sex marriages. Some international networks of affirming churches support blessings, such the Association of Welcoming and Affirming Baptists, Ecumenical Catholic Church, Metropolitan Community Church, Reconciling Ministries Network (Methodist), and the Covenant Network (Pentecostal).

=== Judaism ===
Various international progressive Jewish organizations have adopted resolutions supporting same-sex marriage in synagogues, primarily those that are members of the World Union for Progressive Judaism (since 1993 for Reconstructing Judaism), Alliance for Jewish Renewal in 2000, and the World Council of Synagogues in 2012.

== Studies ==
The American Anthropological Association stated on 26 February 2004:

The results of more than a century of anthropological research on households, kinship relationships, and families, across cultures and through time, provide no support whatsoever for the view that either civilization or viable social orders depend upon marriage as an exclusively heterosexual institution. Rather, anthropological research supports the conclusion that a vast array of family types, including families built upon same-sex partnerships, can contribute to stable and humane societies.

Research findings from 1998 to 2015 from the University of Virginia, Michigan State University, Florida State University, the University of Amsterdam, the New York State Psychiatric Institute, Stanford University, the University of California-San Francisco, the University of California-Los Angeles, Tufts University, Boston Medical Center, the Committee on Psychosocial Aspects of Child and Family Health, and independent researchers also support the findings of this study.

The overall socio-economic and health effects of legal access to same-sex marriage around the world have been summarized by Badgett and co-authors. The review found that sexual minority individuals took-up legal marriage when it became available to them (but at lower rates than different-sex couples). There is instead no evidence that same-sex marriage legalization affected different-sex marriages. On the health side, same-sex marriage legalization increased health insurance coverage for individuals in same-sex couples (in the US), and it led to improvements in sexual health among men who have sex with men, while there is mixed evidence on mental health effects among sexual minorities. In addition, the study found mixed evidence on a range of downstream social outcomes such as attitudes toward LGBTQ+ people and employment choices of sexual minorities.

=== Health ===
As of 2006, the data of current psychological and other social science studies on same-sex marriage in comparison to mixed-sex marriage indicate that same-sex and mixed-sex relationships do not differ in their essential psychosocial dimensions; that a parent's sexual orientation is unrelated to their ability to provide a healthy and nurturing family environment; and that marriage bestows substantial psychological, social, and health benefits. Same-sex parents and carers and their children are likely to benefit in numerous ways from legal recognition of their families, and providing such recognition through marriage will bestow greater benefit than civil unions or domestic partnerships. Studies in the United States have correlated legalization of same-sex marriage to lower rates of HIV infection, psychiatric disorders, and suicide rate in the LGBT population.

== Issues ==
While few societies have recognized same-sex unions as marriages, the historical and anthropological record reveals a large range of attitudes towards same-sex unions ranging from praise, through full acceptance and integration, sympathetic toleration, indifference, prohibition and discrimination, to persecution and physical annihilation. Opponents of same-sex marriages have argued that same-sex marriage, while doing good for the couples that participate in them and the children they are raising, undermines a right of children to be raised by their biological mother and father. Some supporters of same-sex marriages take the view that the government should have no role in regulating personal relationships, while others argue that same-sex marriages would provide social benefits to same-sex couples. (Note: Dale Carpenter is a prominent spokesman for this view. For a better understanding of this view, see Carpenter's writings at "Dale Carpenter". Independent Gay Forum. Archived from the original on 17 November 2006.) The debate regarding same-sex marriages includes debate based upon social viewpoints as well as debate based on majority rules, religious convictions, economic arguments, health-related concerns, and a variety of other issues.

=== Parenting ===
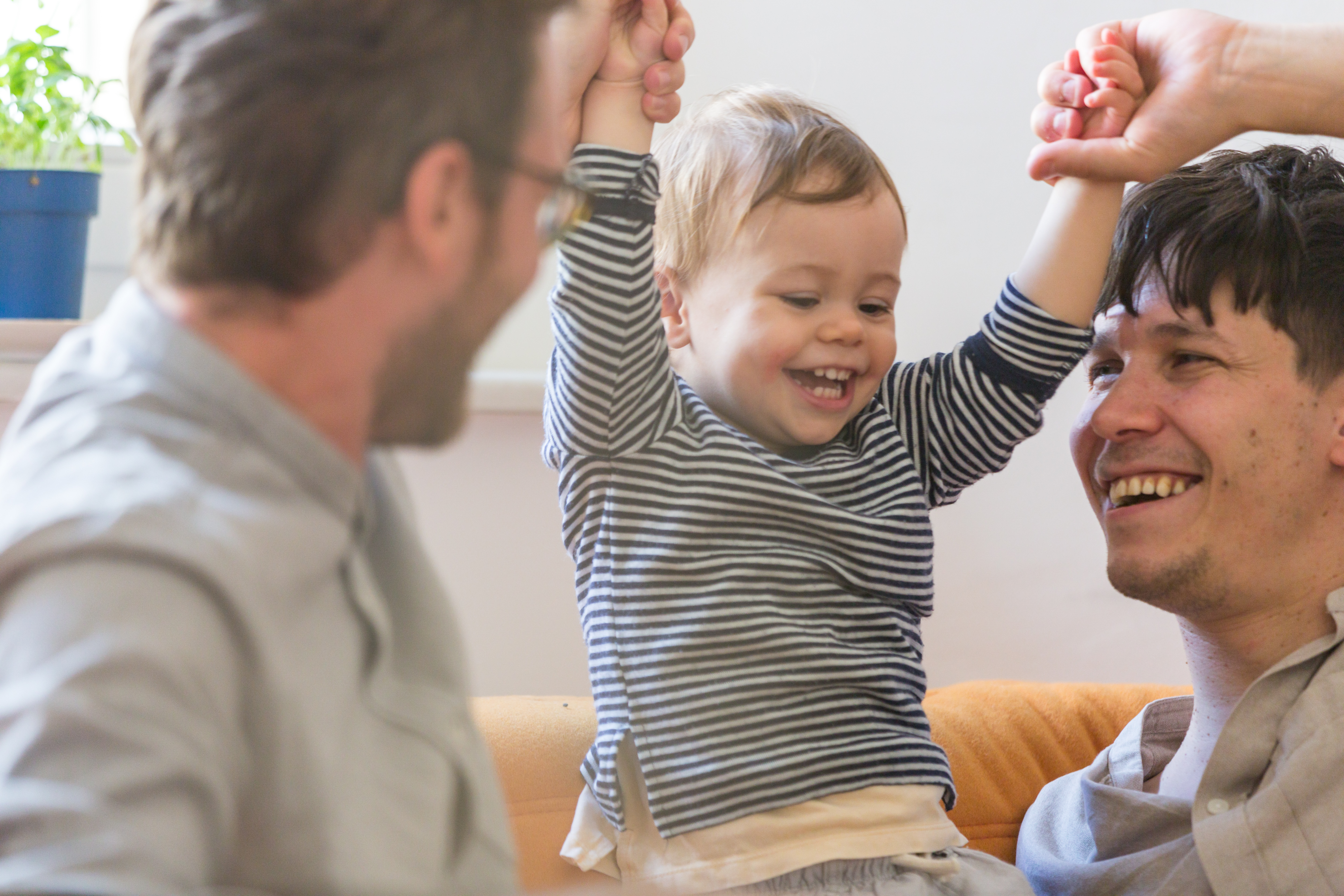
Same-sex couple with a child

Scientific literature indicates that parents' financial, psychological and physical well-being is enhanced by marriage and that children benefit from being raised by two parents within a legally recognized union (either a mixed-sex or same-sex union). As a result, professional scientific associations have argued for same-sex marriage to be legally recognized as it will be beneficial to the children of same-sex parents or carers.

Scientific research has been generally consistent in showing that lesbian and gay parents are as fit and capable as heterosexual parents, and their children are as psychologically healthy and well-adjusted as children reared by heterosexual parents. According to scientific literature reviews, there is no evidence to the contrary.

Compared to heterosexual couples, same-sex couples have a greater need for adoption or assisted reproductive technology to become parents. Lesbian couples often use artificial insemination to achieve pregnancy, and reciprocal in vitro fertilization (where one woman provides the egg and the other gestates the child) is becoming more popular in the 2020s, although many couples cannot afford it. Surrogacy is an option for wealthier gay male couples, but the cost is prohibitive. Other same-sex couples adopt children or raise the children from earlier opposite-sex relationships.

==== Adoption ====
Legal status of adoption by same-sex couples around the world: Joint adoption allowed Second-parent (stepchild) adoption allowed No laws allowing adoption by same-sex couples and no same-sex marriage Same-sex marriage but adoption by married same-sex couples not allowed

All states that allow same-sex marriage also allow the joint adoption of children by those couples with the exception of Ecuador and a third of states in Mexico, though such restrictions have been ruled unconstitutional in Mexico. In addition, Bolivia, Croatia and Israel, which do not recognize same-sex marriage, nonetheless permit joint adoption by same-sex couples. Some additional states do not recognize same-sex marriage but allow stepchild adoption by couples in civil unions, namely the Czech Republic and San Marino.

=== Transgender and intersex people ===
The legal status of same-sex marriage may have implications for the marriages of couples in which one or both parties are transgender, depending on how sex is defined within a jurisdiction. Transgender and intersex individuals may be prohibited from marrying partners of the "opposite" sex or permitted to marry partners of the "same" sex due to legal distinctions. In any legal jurisdiction where marriages are defined without distinction of a requirement of a male and female, these complications do not occur. In addition, some legal jurisdictions recognize a legal and official change of gender, which would allow a transgender male or female to be legally married in accordance with an adopted gender identity.

In the United Kingdom, the Gender Recognition Act 2004 allows a person who has lived in their chosen gender for at least two years to receive a gender recognition certificate officially recognizing their new gender. Because in the United Kingdom marriages were until recently only for mixed-sex couples and civil partnerships are only for same-sex couples, a person had to dissolve their civil partnership before obtaining a gender recognition certificate, and the same was formerly true for marriages in England and Wales, and still is in other territories. Such people are then free to enter or re-enter civil partnerships or marriages in accordance with their newly recognized gender identity. In Austria, a similar provision requiring transsexual people to divorce before having their legal sex marker corrected was found to be unconstitutional in 2006. In Quebec, prior to the legalization of same-sex marriage, only unmarried people could apply for legal change of gender. With the advent of same-sex marriage, this restriction was dropped. A similar provision including sterilization also existed in Sweden, but was phased out in 2013. In the United States, transgender and intersex marriages was subject to legal complications. As definitions and enforcement of marriage are defined by the states, these complications vary from state to state, as some of them prohibit legal changes of gender.

=== Divorce ===
In the United States before the case of Obergefell v. Hodges, couples in same-sex marriages could only obtain a divorce in jurisdictions that recognized same-sex marriages, with some exceptions.

=== Judicial and legislative ===
There are differing positions regarding the manner in which same-sex marriage has been introduced into democratic jurisdictions. A "majority rules" position holds that same-sex marriage is valid, or void and illegal, based upon whether it has been accepted by a simple majority of voters or of their elected representatives.

In contrast, a civil rights view holds that the institution can be validly created through the ruling of an impartial judiciary carefully examining the questioning and finding that the right to marry regardless of the gender of the participants is guaranteed under the civil rights laws of the jurisdiction.

== Public opinion ==
Public opinion of same-sex marriage. Fraction in favor: 5/6+ 2/3+ / 1/2+ 1/3+ / 1/6+ <1/6 / no polls

Numerous polls and studies on the issue have been conducted. A trend of increasing support for same-sex marriage has been revealed across many countries of the world, often driven in large part by a generational difference in support. Polling that was conducted in developed democracies in this century shows a majority of people in support of same-sex marriage. Support for same-sex marriage has increased across every age group, political ideology, religion, gender, race and region of various developed countries in the world.

Various detailed polls and studies on same-sex marriage that were conducted in several countries show that support for same-sex marriage significantly increases with higher levels of education and is also significantly stronger among younger generations, with a clear trend of continually increasing support.

Greater support with youth

Pew Research polling results from 32 countries found 21 with statistically higher support for same-sex marriage among those under 35 than among those over 35 in 2022–2023. Countries with the greatest absolute difference are placed to the left in the following chart. Countries without a significant generational difference are placed to the right.

- over 35
- additional support from those under 35

A 2016 survey by the Varkey Foundation found similarly high support of same-sex marriage (63%) among 18–21-year-olds in an online survey of 18 countries around the world.

(The sampling error is approx. 4% for Nigeria and 3% for the other countries. Because of legal constraints, the question on same-sex marriage was not asked in the survey countries of Russia and Indonesia.)

Opinion polls for same-sex marriage by country

Same-sex marriage performed nationwide
Same-sex marriage performed in some parts of the country
Civil unions or registered partnerships nationwide
Civil unions or registered partnerships pending
Same-sex marriage rights pending
Same-sex sexual activity is illegal

Country	Pollster	Year	For (Note: Because some polls do not report 'neither', those that do are listed with simple yes/no percentages in parentheses, so their figures can be compared.)	Against	Neither (Note: Comprises: Neutral; Don't know; No answer; Other; Refused.)	Margin of error	Ref.
Albania	Ipsos	2023	26%	73% (74%)	1%		
Andorra	Institut d'Estudis Andorrans	2013	70% (79%)	19% (21%)	11%		
Antigua and Barbuda	AmericasBarometer	2017	12%	–	–		
Argentina	Ipsos	2024	69% (81%)	16% [9% support some rights] (19%)	15% not sure	±5%	
Argentina	Pew Research Center	2023	67% (72%)	26% (28%)	7%	±3.6%	
Armenia	Pew Research Center	2015	3% (3%)	96% (97%)	1%	±3%	
Aruba	Accion 21	2021	46%				
Australia	Ipsos	2024	64% (73%)	25% [13% support some rights] (28%)	12% not sure	±3.5%	
Australia	Pew Research Center	2023	75% (77%)	23%	2%	±3.6%	
Austria	Eurobarometer	2023	65% (68%)	30% (32%)	5%		
(The Bahamas) Bahamas	AmericasBarometer	2015	11%	–	–		
Belarus	Pew Research Center	2015	16% (16%)	81% (84%)	3%	±4%	
Belgium	Ipsos	2024	69% (78%)	19% [9% support some rights] (22%)	12% not sure	±5%	
Belgium	Eurobarometer	2023	79%	19%	2%		
Belize	AmericasBarometer	2014	8%	–	–		
Bolivia	AmericasBarometer	2017	35%	65%	–	±1.0%	
Bosnia and Herzegovina	Ipsos	2023	26% (27%)	71% (73%)	3%		
Brazil	Ipsos (Note: More urban/educated than nationally represented.)	2024	51% (62%)	31% [17% support some rights] (38%)	18% not sure	±3.5%	
Brazil	Pew Research Center	2023	52% (57%)	40% (43%)	8%	±3.6%	
Bulgaria	Eurobarometer	2023	17% (18%)	75% (82%)	8%		
Cambodia	Pew Research Center	2023	57% (58%)	42%	1%		
Canada	Ipsos	2024	65% (75%)	22% [10% support some rights] (25%)	13% not sure	±3.5%	
Canada	Pew Research Center	2023	79% (84%)	15% (16%)	6%	±3.6%	
Chile	Cadem	2024	77% (82%)	22% (18%)	2%	±3.6%	
China	Ipsos	2021	43% (52%)	39% [20% support some rights] (48%)	18% not sure	±3.5%	
Colombia	Ipsos	2024	46% (58%)	33% [19% support some rights] (42%)	21%	±5%	
Colombia	Invamer	2024	43% (45%)	53% (55%)	4%		
Costa Rica	CIEP	2018	35%	64%	1%		
Croatia	Eurobarometer	2023	42% (45%)	51% (55%)	7%		
Cuba	Apretaste	2019	63%	37%	–		
Cyprus	Eurobarometer	2023	50% (53%)	44% (47%)	6%		
Czech Republic	Eurobarometer	2023	60%	34%	6%		
Denmark	Eurobarometer	2023	93%	5%	2%		
Dominica	AmericasBarometer	2017	10%	90%	–	±1.1%	
Dominican Republic	CDN 37	2018	45%	55%	-		
Ecuador	AmericasBarometer	2019	23% (31%)	51% (69%)	26%		
El Salvador	Universidad Francisco Gavidia	2021		82.5%	–		
Estonia	Eurobarometer	2023	41% (45%)	51% (55%)	8%		
Finland	Eurobarometer	2023	76% (81%)	18% (19%)	6%		
France	Ipsos	2024	62% (70%)	26% [16% support some rights] (30%)	12% not sure	±3.5%	
France	Pew Research Center	2023	82% (85%)	14% (15%)	4%	±3.6%	
France	Eurobarometer	2023	79% (85%)	14% (15%)	7%		
(Georgia (country)) Georgia	Women's Initiatives Supporting Group	2021	10% (12%)	75% (88%)	15%		
Germany	Ipsos	2024	73% (83%)	18% [10% support some rights] (20%)	12% not sure	±3.5%	
Germany	Pew Research Center	2023	80% (82%)	18%	2%	±3.6%	
Germany	Eurobarometer	2023	84% (87%)	13%	3%		
Greece	Pew Research Center	2023	48% (49%)	49% (51%)	3%	±3.6%	
Greece	Eurobarometer	2023	57% (59%)	40% (41%)	3%		
Grenada	AmericasBarometer	2017	12%	88%	–	±1.4%	
Guatemala	AmericasBarometer	2017	23%	77%	–	±1.1%	
Guyana	AmericasBarometer	2017	21%	79%	–	±1.3%	
Haiti	AmericasBarometer	2017	5%	95%	–	±0.3%	
Honduras	CID Gallup	2018	17% (18%)	75% (82%)	8%		
Hong Kong	Pew Research Center	2023	58% (59%)	40% (41%)	2%		
Hungary	Ipsos	2024	44% (56%)	35% [18% support some rights] (44%)	21% not sure	±5%	
Hungary	Pew Research Center	2023	31% (33%)	64% (67%)	5%	±3.6%	
Hungary	Eurobarometer	2023	42% (45%)	52% (55%)	6%		
Iceland	Gallup	2006	89%	11%	–		
India	Pew Research Center	2023	53% (55%)	43% (45%)	4%	±3.6%	
Indonesia	Pew Research Center	2023	5%	92% (95%)	3%	±3.6%	
(Republic of Ireland) Ireland	Ipsos	2024	68% (76%)	21% [8% support some rights] (23%)	10%	±5%	
(Republic of Ireland) Ireland	Eurobarometer	2023	86% (91%)	9%	5%		
Israel	Pew Research Center	2023	36% (39%)	56% (61%)	8%	±3.6%	
Italy	Ipsos	2024	58% (66%)	29% [19% support some rights] (33%)	12% not sure	±3.5%	
Italy	Pew Research Center	2023	73% (75%)	25%	2%	±3.6%	
Italy	Eurobarometer	2023	69% (72%)	27% (28%)	4%		
Jamaica	AmericasBarometer	2017	16%	84%	–	±1.0%	
Japan	Kyodo News	2023	64% (72%)	25% (28%)	11%		
Japan	Asahi Shimbun	2023	72% (80%)	18% (20%)	10%		
Japan	Ipsos	2024	42% (54%)	31% [25% support some rights] (40%)	22% not sure	±3.5%	
Japan	Pew Research Center	2023	68% (72%)	26% (28%)	6%	±2.75%	
Kazakhstan	Pew Research Center	2016	7% (7%)	89% (93%)	4%		
Kenya	Pew Research Center	2023	9%	90% (91%)	1%	±3.6%	
Kosovo	Ipsos	2023	20% (21%)	77% (79%)	3%		
Latvia	Eurobarometer	2023	36%	59%	5%		
Liechtenstein	Liechtenstein Institut	2021	72%	28%	0%		
Lithuania	Eurobarometer	2023	39%	55%	6%		
Luxembourg	Eurobarometer	2023	84%	13%	3%		
Malaysia	Pew Research Center	2023	17%	82% (83%)	1%		
Malta	Eurobarometer	2023	74%	24%	2%		
Mexico	Ipsos	2024	55%	29% [16% support some rights]	17% not sure	±3.5%	
Mexico	Pew Research Center	2023	63% (66%)	32% (34%)	5%	±3.6%	
Moldova	Europa Libera Moldova	2022	14%	86%			
Montenegro	Ipsos	2023	36% (37%)	61% (63%)	3%		
Mozambique (3 cities)	Lambda	2017	28% (32%)	60% (68%)	12%		
Netherlands	Ipsos	2024	77%	15% [8% support some rights]	8% not sure	±5%	
Netherlands	Pew Research Center	2023	89% (90%)	10%	1%	±3.6%	
Netherlands	Eurobarometer	2023	94%	5%	1%		
New Zealand	Ipsos	2023	70% (78%)	20% [11% support some rights] (22%)	9%	±3.5%	
Nicaragua	AmericasBarometer	2017	25%	75%	–	±1.0%	
Nigeria	Pew Research Center	2023	2%	97% (98%)	1%	±3.6%	
North Macedonia	Ipsos	2023	20% (21%)	78% (80%)	2%		
Norway	Pew Research Center	2017	72% (79%)	19% (21%)	9%		
Panama	AmericasBarometer	2017	22%	78%	–	±1.1%	
Paraguay	AmericasBarometer	2017	26%	74%	–	±0.9%	
Peru	Ipsos	2024	36% (45%)	44% [30% support some rights] (55%)	20%	±5%	
Philippines	SWS	2018	22% (26%)	61% (73%)	16%		
Poland	Ipsos	2024	51% (54%)	43% (46%)	6%		
Poland	Pew Research Center	2023	41% (43%)	54% (57%)	5%	±3.6%	
Poland	ABR Sesta	2025	54% (61%)	35% (39%)	11%		
Poland	United Surveys by IBRiS	2024	50% (55%)	41% (45%)	9%		
Poland	Eurobarometer	2023	50%	45%	5%		
Portugal	Ipsos	2023	80% (84%)	15% [11% support some rights] (16%)	5%		
Portugal	Eurobarometer	2023	81%	14%	5%		
Romania	Ipsos	2023	25% (30%)	59% [26% support some rights] (70%)	17%	±3.5%	
Romania	Eurobarometer	2023	25%	69%	6%		
Russia	Ipsos	2021	17% (21%)	64% [12% support some rights] (79%)	20% not sure	±4.8%	
Russia	FOM	2019	7% (8%)	85% (92%)	8%	±3.6%	
Saint Kitts and Nevis	AmericasBarometer	2017	9%	91%	–	±1.0%	
Saint Lucia	AmericasBarometer	2017	11%	89%	–	±0.9%	
Saint Vincent and the Grenadines	AmericasBarometer	2017	4%	96%	–	±0.6%	
Serbia	Ipsos	2023	24% (25%)	73% (75%)	3%		
Singapore	Ipsos	2024	33%	46% [21% support some rights]	21%	±5%	
Singapore	Pew Research Center	2023	45% (47%)	51% (53%)	4%		
Slovakia	Focus	2024	36% (38%)	60% (62%)	4%		
Slovakia	Eurobarometer	2023	37%	56%	7%		
Slovenia	Eurobarometer	2023	62% (64%)	37% (36%)	1%		
South Africa	Ipsos	2024	53%	32% [14% support some rights]	13%	±5%	
South Africa	Pew Research Center	2023	38% (39%)	59% (61%)	3%	±3.6%	
South Korea	Ipsos	2024	36%	37% [16% support some rights]	27% not sure	±5%	
South Korea	Pew Research Center	2023	41% (42%)	56% (58%)	3%		
Spain	Ipsos	2024	73% (80%)	19% [13% support some rights] (21%)	9% not sure	±3.5%	
Spain	Pew Research Center	2023	87% (90%)	10%	3%	±3.6%	
Spain	Eurobarometer	2023	88% (91%)	9% (10%)	3%		
Sri Lanka	Pew Research Center	2023	23% (25%)	69% (75%)	8%		
Suriname	AmericasBarometer	2014	18%	–	–		
Sweden	Ipsos	2024	78% (84%)	15% [8% support some rights] (16%)	7% not sure	±5%	
Sweden	Pew Research Center	2023	92% (94%)	6%	2%	±3.6%	
Sweden	Eurobarometer	2023	94%	5%	1%		
Switzerland	Ipsos	2023	54% (61%)	34% [16% support some rights] (39%)	13% not sure	±3.5%	
Taiwan	CNA	2023	63%	37%			
Taiwan	Pew Research Center	2023	45% (51%)	43% (49%)	12%		
Thailand	Ipsos	2024	58%	29% [20% support some rights]	12% not sure	±5%	
Thailand	Pew Research Center	2023	60% (65%)	32% (35%)	8%		
Trinidad and Tobago	AmericasBarometer	2014	16%	–	–		
Turkey	Ipsos	2024	18% (26%)	52% [19% support some rights] (74%)	30% not sure	±5%	
Ukraine	Kyiv International Institute of Sociology	2023	44% (55%)	36% (45%)	20%	±2.2%	
Ukraine	Rating	2023	37% (47%)	42% (53%)	22%	±1.5%	
United Kingdom	YouGov	2023	77% (84%)	15% (16%)	8%		
United Kingdom	Ipsos	2024	66% (73%)	24% [11% support some rights] (27%)	10% not sure	±3.5%	
United Kingdom	Pew Research Center	2023	74% (77%)	22% (23%)	4%	±3.6%	
United States	Gallup	2025	68% (70%)	29% (30%)			
United States	Pew Research Center	2023	63% (65%)	34% (35%)	3%	±3.6%	
Uruguay	LatinoBarómetro	2023	78% (80%)	20%	2%		
Venezuela	Equilibrium Cende	2023	55% (63%)	32% (37%)	13%		
Vietnam	Pew Research Center	2023	65% (68%)	30% (32%)	5%		

== See also ==
- LGBT rights by country or territory
- Religion and sexuality
- Legal status of same-sex marriage
- Societal attitudes toward homosexuality

== Bibliography ==
- Boswell, John (1995). The Marriage of Likeness: Same-sex Unions in Pre-modern Europe. New York: Simon Harper and Collins. ISBN 978-0-00-255508-1.
- Boswell, John (1994). Same-sex Unions in Premodern Europe. New York: Villard Books. ISBN 978-0-679-43228-9.
- Brownson, James V. (2013). Bible, Gender, Sexuality: Reforming the Church's Debate on Same-Sex Relationships. Wm. B. Eerdmans Publishing Company. ISBN 978-0-8028-6863-3.
- Calò, Emanuele (2009). Matrimonio à la carte — Matrimoni, convivenze registrate e divorzi dopo l'intervento comunitario. Milano: Giuffrè.
- Caramagno, Thomas C. (2002). Irreconcilable Differences? Intellectual Stalemate in the Gay Rights Debate. Westport, CT: Praeger. ISBN 978-0-275-97721-4.
- Cere, Daniel (2004). Divorcing Marriage: Unveiling the Dangers in Canada's New Social Experiment. Montreal: McGill-Queen's University Press. ISBN 978-0-7735-2895-6.
- Chauncey, George (2004). Why Marriage?: The History Shaping Today's Debate over Gay Equality. New York: Basic Books. ISBN 978-0-465-00957-2.
- Dobson, James C. (2004). Marriage Under Fire. Sisters, Or.: Multnomah. ISBN 978-1-59052-431-2.
- George, Robert P.; Elshtain, Jean Bethke, eds. (2006). The Meaning of Marriage: Family, State, Market, And Morals. Dallas: Spence Publishing Company. ISBN 978-1-890626-64-8.
- Goss, Robert E.; Strongheart, Amy Adams Squire, eds. (2008). Our Families, Our Values: Snapshots of Queer Kinship. New York, NY: The Harrington Park Press, An Imprint of the Haworth Press, Inc. ISBN 978-1-56023-910-9.
- Greenwich, Alex; Robinson, Shirleene (2018). Yes Yes Yes: Australia's Journey to Marriage Equality. Australia: NewSouth Books. ISBN 978-1-74223-599-8.
- Larocque, Sylvain (2006). Gay Marriage: The Story of a Canadian Social Revolution. Toronto: James Lorimer & Company. ISBN 978-1-55028-927-5.
- Laycock, Douglas; Picarello, Anthony Jr.; Wilson, Robin Fretwell, eds. (2008). Same-Sex Marriage and Religious Liberty: Emerging Conflicts. Lanham, MD: Rowman & Littlefield Publishers, Inc. ISBN 978-0-7425-6326-1.
- Moats, David (2004). Civil Wars: A Battle For Gay Marriage. New York, NY: Harcourt, Inc. ISBN 978-0-15-101017-2.
- Oliver, Marilyn Tower (1998). Gay and lesbian rights: a struggle. Enslow Publishers. ISBN 978-0-89490-958-0. Archived from the original on 4 February 2021.
- Rauch, Jonathan (2004). Gay Marriage: Why It Is Good for Gays, Good for Straights, and Good for America. New York, NY: Henry Holt and Company, LLC. ISBN 978-0-8050-7815-2.
- Rugg, Sally (2019). How Powerful We Are: Behind the scenes with one of Australia's leading activists. Australia: Hachette Australia. ISBN 978-0-7336-4222-7. OCLC 1103918151.
- Smart, Carol; Heaphy, Brian; Einarsdottir, Anna (2013). Same sex marriages: new generations, new relationships. Genders and sexualities in the social sciences. Houndmills, Basingstoke, Hampshire: Palgrave Macmillan. ISBN 978-0-230-30023-1.
- Spedale, Darren (2006). Gay Marriage: For Better or For Worse? What We've Learned From the Evidence. New York: Oxford University Press. ISBN 978-0-19-518751-9.
- Sullivan, Andrew, ed. (2004). Same-Sex Marriage: Pro and Con — A Reader, Revised Updated Edition. New York, NY: Vintage Books, a division of Random House, Inc. ISBN 978-1-4000-7866-0.
- Truluck, Rembert S. (2000). Steps to Recovery from Bible Abuse. Gaithersburg, MD: Chi Rho Press, Inc. ISBN 978-1-888493-16-0.
- Wolfson, Evan (2004). Why Marriage Matters: America, Equality, and Gay People's Right to Marry. New York: Simon & Schuster. ISBN 978-0-7432-6459-4.
