= Same-sex marriage in Cuba =

Same-sex marriage has been legal in Cuba since 27 September 2022, following a national referendum held two days earlier in which a majority of voters approved of its legalization. The Constitution of Cuba had prohibited same-sex marriage until it was revised in 2019, and in May of the same year, the government announced plans to legalize it. A draft family code containing provisions allowing same-sex couples to marry and adopt was approved by the National Assembly of People's Power on 21 December 2021. The text was under public consultation until 6 June 2022, and was approved by the Assembly on 22 July. The measure was approved by two-thirds of voters in a referendum held on 25 September. President Miguel Díaz-Canel signed the new family code into law on 26 September, and it took effect upon publication in the Official Gazette the following day.

Cuba was the first independent nation in the Caribbean, the first communist state, the fourth country in North America, the eighth in Latin America, (Note: After Argentina, Brazil, Chile, Colombia, Costa Rica, Ecuador, and Uruguay) and the 32nd in the world to legalize same-sex marriage.

== Civil unions ==
A civil union law was first proposed in 2007. The bill was reportedly discussed by the National Assembly of People's Power and promoted by Mariela Castro, director of the Cuban Sexual Education Center and daughter of the First Secretary of the Communist Party, Raúl Castro. The legislation did not reach a vote in Parliament, even though Mariela Castro said that it had the support of her father.

The 2022 Cuban Family Code put to a referendum on 25 September 2022 includes provisions allowing couples access to civil unions (Spanish: unión de hecho afectiva, pronounced [uˈnjon de ˈetʃo afeɣˈtiβa]).

== Same-sex marriage ==
Homosexuality laws in Central America and the Caribbean Islands. Same-sex marriage Other type of partnership Unregistered cohabitation No recognition of same-sex couples Constitution limits marriage to opposite-sex couples Same-sex sexual activity illegal but law not enforced

=== Attempts to repeal constitutional ban ===
Article 36 of the Constitution of Cuba, enacted in 1976, defined marriage as "the voluntarily established union between a man and a woman" until 2019. This wording constitutionally banned same-sex marriage. In December 2017, LGBT groups launched a public campaign to repeal the ban. On 4 May 2018, Mariela Castro said she would propose an amendment to the Constitution and accompanying measure to legalize same-sex marriage, as the process of constitutional reform was expected to begin in July 2018. On 21 July, the Secretary of the Council of State, Homero Acosta Álvarez, said that the draft constitution included a provision defining marriage as a "union between two people". The National Assembly approved the draft on 22 July. It was subject to a public consultation process between 13 August and 15 November 2018.

The issue of same-sex marriage resulted in rare public debates and organising in Cuba. In June 2018, five Christian denominations called same-sex marriage "contrary to the spirit of the Communist Revolution". In what was described as "a war of posters", both opponents and supporters of same-sex marriage displayed hundreds of posters around Havana. In September 2018, following conservative opposition to the proposal to legalise same-sex marriage, President Miguel Díaz-Canel announced his support for same-sex marriage in his first interview since taking office in April, telling TV Telesur that he supported "marriage between people without any restrictions", and was in favor of "eliminating any type of discrimination in society". On 18 December, a parliamentary commission removed the definition of marriage from the draft constitution. Instead, the commission chose to use gender-neutral language and define marriage as a "social and legal institution" without reference to the gender of the parties. This meant that the new constitution would not contain a ban on same-sex marriages, but also would not legalize same-sex unions. Mariela Castro said that same-sex marriage would instead be legalised through a change to the Family Code. The new constitution was approved in a referendum by 90.6% of voters on 24 February 2019, and took effect on 10 April 2019. Writing in the Havana Times, commentator and human rights activist Luis Rondón Paz argued that the government never intended to legalize same-sex marriage, and was instead seeking to deflect attention from other domestic issues and promote itself internationally as a progressive state. Article 82 now reads as follows:

Marriage is a social and legal institution. It is one form of family organization. It is based on free will and equality of rights, obligations and legal capacity of the spouses. The law decides how it is constituted and its effects. (Note: Spanish: El matrimonio es una institución social y jurídica. Es una de las formas de organización de las familias. Se funda en el libre consentimiento y en la igualdad de derechos, obligaciones y capacidad legal de los cónyuges. La ley determina la forma en que se constituye y sus efectos.)

=== Changes to the Family Code ===
Results of the 2022 Family Code referendum by province

Before the legalization of same-sex marriage in September 2022, article 2 of the Cuban Family Code restricted marriage to "a man and a woman". It also did not recognize same-sex marriages performed outside of Cuba.

In early March 2019, a few days after the constitutional referendum, the government launched a public consultation process on a new family code that would include provisions recognizing same-sex marriage. In May 2019, it was announced that the Union of Jurists of Cuba was working on the new code, with a source stating that "Cuba is working today on the elaboration of a new Code of the Family, with the challenge of including the diversity of family institutions and problems of the social scenario". A draft family code legalizing same-sex marriage was presented in September 2021. It was approved unanimously by the National Assembly on 21 December 2021, and published in the Official Gazette on 13 January 2022. The text was under public consultation from 15 February to 6 June 2022. 79,000 meetings were held across Cuba in which about 6.5 million citizens participated, according to official data. The government reported that 61% of the responses to the consultation were in favor of same-sex marriage. During the consultation process, some LGBT activists criticized holding a referendum as "a smokescreen for repression and human rights violations by the government", an attempt at "pinkwashing", and argued that the Parliament should approve a law on same-sex marriage without a referendum "because human rights should not be subject to the majority's will". In an op-ed for the Council on Hemispheric Affairs, Tamara Hansen argued that "[s]ome [people] considered [that] pushing forward with explicit recognition of the right to same-sex marriage without building wider understanding and support could undermine the constitutional reform process. In particular, it could have opened a space for enemies of the Cuban revolution to sow further division in society [...]". The government said that it did not want to "impose same-sex marriage by force against the public's will".

Article 201 of the code describes marriage as a "consensual union of two people", (Note: Article 201 states: El matrimonio es la unión voluntariamente concertada de dos personas., translating to "Marriage is the consensual union of two people.") and chapter 3 of the code allows same-sex couples to adopt. The code also ensures greater protection for children and adolescents, the co-responsibility of parents in their education, and strict equality of rights between men and women. It also guarantees the right of minors not to be the object of exclusion, violence or parental neglect, and establishes a uniform marriageable age at 18 for men and women. Final approval by the Assembly occurred on 22 July 2022, with the code put to a referendum on 25 September. Approximately 67% of voters approved the changes to the code, making Cuba the first communist state and the 32nd country in the world to legalize same-sex marriage. President Díaz-Canel signed the new code into law on 26 September, and it took effect the following day upon publication in the Official Gazette. The first same-sex marriage in Cuba was performed on 5 October 2022 in Manzanillo.

2022 Cuban Family Code referendum
Choice	Votes	%
For	3,950,288	66.85
Against	1,959,097	33.15
Total	5,909,385	100.00
Valid votes	5,909,385	94.26
Invalid/blank votes	360,042	5.74
Total votes	6,269,427	100.00
Registered voters/turnout	8,447,467	74.22

=== Statistics ===
75 same-sex marriages were performed in the first month of legalization, accounting for about 2.3% of all marriages performed in Cuba during that time. 513 same-sex couples had married by 9 March 2023. According to the National Office of Statistics, 955 same-sex marriages were performed in Cuba in 2024; 481 between two men and 474 between two women. The majority of same-sex marriages were registered in La Habana Province (285), followed by Villa Clara (85), Sancti Spíritus (71), Matanzas (62), Cienfuegos (54), Camagüey (53), Mayabeque (52), Holguín (51), Ciego de Ávila (47), Artemisa (38), Santiago de Cuba (35), Pinar del Río (27), Granma (25), Las Tunas (23), Guantánamo (22), and Isla de la Juventud (3). In addition, 22 marriages were performed in embassies or consulates outside of Cuba. Further, there were 102 same-sex divorces during that same period, accounting for 0.48% of all divorces.

=== Religious performance ===
A pastor from the Metropolitan Community Church in Matanzas officiated at the marriage ceremony of Luis Vallejo Rodríguez and Luis Fernández Neves on 6 October 2019, in what is believed to be the first church wedding for a same-sex couple in Cuba, though the marriage lacked legal recognition at the time. Santería, a syncretic religion that developed from the Yoruba religion, Catholicism and Spiritism, has no central position on the issue of same-sex marriage, though has generally being seen as more supportive of homosexuality and same-sex unions than the dominant Catholic Church. While some babalao are openly gay men, others oppose same-sex unions. Magazine Q de Cuir reported that no ilé (houses of worship) intervened politically during the Family Code referendum in 2022; "The matter was not [their] responsibility. [They] were on the sidelines. [They] didn't give it much importance either."

In 2018, various denominations, including the Methodist Church in Cuba and Baptist and Evangelical groups, co-signed a letter affirming their belief that the family is "a divine institution created by God and that marriage is exclusively a union between a man and a woman," and describing same-sex marriage as "contrary to the spirit of the Communist Revolution". The Catholic Church also opposes same-sex marriage and does not allow its priests to officiate at such marriages. The Conference of Catholic Bishops of Cuba campaigned against legalization in 2022, describing same-sex marriage as "ideological colonialism" imposed by the West. The Archdiocese of Santiago de Cuba called of "regrettable consequences" if same-sex marriage were legalized. The Conference called on the government to look for "other legal ways" to protect same-sex unions, but stressed that "[t]hat should not be taken as an argument to change the definition of an institution of the natural order, such as marriage." In December 2023, the Holy See published Fiducia supplicans, a declaration allowing Catholic priests to bless couples who are not considered to be married according to church teaching, including the blessing of same-sex couples.

== Public opinion ==
A 2019 Apretaste opinion survey showed that 63% of Cubans were in favor of legalising same-sex marriage, while 37% were opposed.

== See also ==
- LGBT rights in Cuba
- Recognition of same-sex unions in the Americas
