= Same-sex marriage in Colombia =

Same-sex marriage has been legal in Colombia since 28 April 2016, following a 6–3 ruling from the Constitutional Court that banning same-sex marriage is unconstitutional under the Constitution of Colombia. The decision took effect immediately. Previously, several bills to legalize same-sex marriage had been proposed in the Congress of Colombia, subsequent to a 2011 Constitutional Court decision that same-sex couples were entitled to form a family, but all were stalled or rejected. Colombia was the fourth country in South America, after Argentina, Brazil and Uruguay, and the nineteenth in the world to legalize same-sex marriage. The first same-sex wedding was performed in Cali on 24 May 2016.

Colombia has also recognised same-sex de facto unions, providing some of the rights and benefits of marriage, since 2007. A bill to expand the rights of civil partners was rejected by Congress in 2007 despite President Álvaro Uribe's support.

== Civil unions ==
=== Establishment and court rulings ===
Same-sex de facto unions (Spanish: unión marital de hecho, pronounced [uˈnjom maɾiˈtal de ˈetʃo]) have been recognized in Colombia since 2007. De facto unions can be registered through a public deed with a notary or a judge. A registered union may provide greater convenience when accessing rights. If unregistered, a person may have to prove the union's existence to a court.

On 7 February 2007, the Constitutional Court of Colombia extended several property and pension rights to cohabiting same-sex couples. A subsequent court decision, handed down in October 2007, extended social security and health insurance rights to same-sex couples. On 28 January 2009, the Constitutional Court gave 42 more rights previously only granted to different-sex couples to cohabitating same-sex couples, including citizenship rights, residence permits, testimony when in jury, and family property laws. Another ruling that was handed down on 13 April 2011 extended inheritance rights to same-sex couples. The Constitutional Court ruled on 4 January 2011 that couples wishing to prove their de facto unions must provide information on their relationships, including social events they have attended together, mutual support during difficult times or joint projects.

=== Congress proposals ===
On 15 June 2007, the Chamber of Representatives approved a historic same-sex union bill by a vote of 62–43, and President Álvaro Uribe was expected to sign the measure into law, which had already been approved by the Senate in April. However, on 19 June, a group of conservative senators broke party discipline in what is usually a routine vote on the final form of a bill and defeated the measure by 29–34 in the 102-member Senate. About 80 advocates held a demonstration outside the National Capitol the following day, protesting the bill's defeat. Supporters vowed to revive the legislation. The bill, which had been endorsed by conservative President Uribe, would have made Colombia the first nation in Latin America to grant same-sex couples in long-term relationships the same rights to health insurance, inheritance and social security as married couples.

On 17 March 2015, Senator Armando Benedetti introduced a civil union bill. The bill was not voted on, and it was re-introduced by Senator Roy Barreras on 30 July 2015. On the same day, senators Benedetti and Barreras introduced a bill allowing same-sex couples to adopt children, but likewise the measure was not voted on.

=== Statistics ===
From February 2007 to August 2012, at least 51 same-sex de facto unions were registered by notaries in the coastal city of Cartagena. During that same time period, 74 and 140 such unions were registered in the cities of Soledad and Bogotá, respectively.

== Same-sex marriage ==
Recognition of same-sex unions in South America Marriage Other type of partnership Unrecognized Constitution limits marriage to opposite-sex couples Same-sex sexual activity illegal, though penalties not enforced

=== Legislative proposals ===
On 26 July 2011, the Constitutional Court ruled unanimously 9–0 that, although it could not change the definition of marriage as "the union of a man and a woman", same-sex couples have the right to form a family. The court ordered the Congress of Colombia to pass legislation addressing this issue, whether by legalizing same-sex marriage or another marriage-like union, within two years (i.e. by 20 June 2013). If such a law were not passed by that deadline, the court ruled that same-sex couples would automatically become able to register their relationships with a notary. In 2011, four bills were filed in Congress to recognize same-sex couples; two used the word "marriage", and the other two would have created civil unions.

In October 2012, Senator Armando Benedetti introduced a bill legalizing same-sex marriage. The bill initially only allowed for civil unions, but the text was later changed by Benedetti to permit same-sex couples to marry. President Juan Manuel Santos did not take a position on the bill. The Senate's First Committee approved the bill on 4 December 2012. On 24 April 2013, it was rejected by the Senate in a 17–51 vote, after having been postponed on two different occasions. The negative outcome was expected, as the two biggest parties made a commitment to kill the bill. Senator Benedetti responded to the vote calling the Congress "worthless", and stating that senators who voted against the project wanted the Congress to be like the ones of "Congo, Uganda, Bolivia and Haiti". Days before the vote, the superintendent of the Superintendence of Notaries and Registrations (SNR; Superintendencia de Notariado y Registro), Jorge Enrique Vélez, announced that if the Congress failed to pass the same-sex marriage bill before the 20 June deadline, the Ministry of Justice and Law, led by Minister Ruth Stella Correa Palacio, would prepare guidelines for notaries and judges to conduct "solemn contracts" for same-sex couples. On 18 April 2013, the SNR presented its own proposal, which sought to set guidelines for the celebration of same-sex "marital unions". On 20 June, notaries across the country started performing these unions; however, LGBT activists advised couples not to enter into these contracts, arguing that the framework for a "marital contract" did not exist in Colombian law. In the following days, several couples made petitions to judges to have their relationships recognized as marriages. Benedetti introduced another same-sex marriage bill on 30 July 2015. The Senate's First Committee began debating the bill on 9 December 2015, but it was not voted on by Congress.

On 24 July 2013, a judge in Bogotá declared a same-sex couple legally married, marking the first same-sex marriage in Colombia. In September 2013, two judges married two other same-sex couples. The first marriage was challenged by a conservative group, and it was initially annulled. However, in October, the Bogotá High Court maintained the validity of that marriage. The issue of same-sex marriage was once again discussed by the Constitutional Court after the Office of the Inspector General requested that the court invalidate all the marriages. A hearing was scheduled for 7 May 2015. It was postponed as some judges were not present and a new hearing open to the public occurred on 30 July. A verdict was to be reached before 31 August 2015.

=== Recognition of marriages performed abroad ===
In May 2015, Interior Minister Juan Fernando Cristo announced the government's support for a move to recognise same-sex marriage. He made the statement the day after a multi-country same-sex couple began an unprecedented legal battle to have their 2013 marriage performed in Spain recognised in Colombia. Government agencies began recognising same-sex marriages lawfully performed in foreign jurisdictions in March 2016. Same-sex couples married abroad are now entitled to the same visa, health care benefits, inheritance and pension rights as different-sex spouses once they take their stamped marriage certificates and identification papers to the nearest designated office.

=== Constitutional Court ruling ===
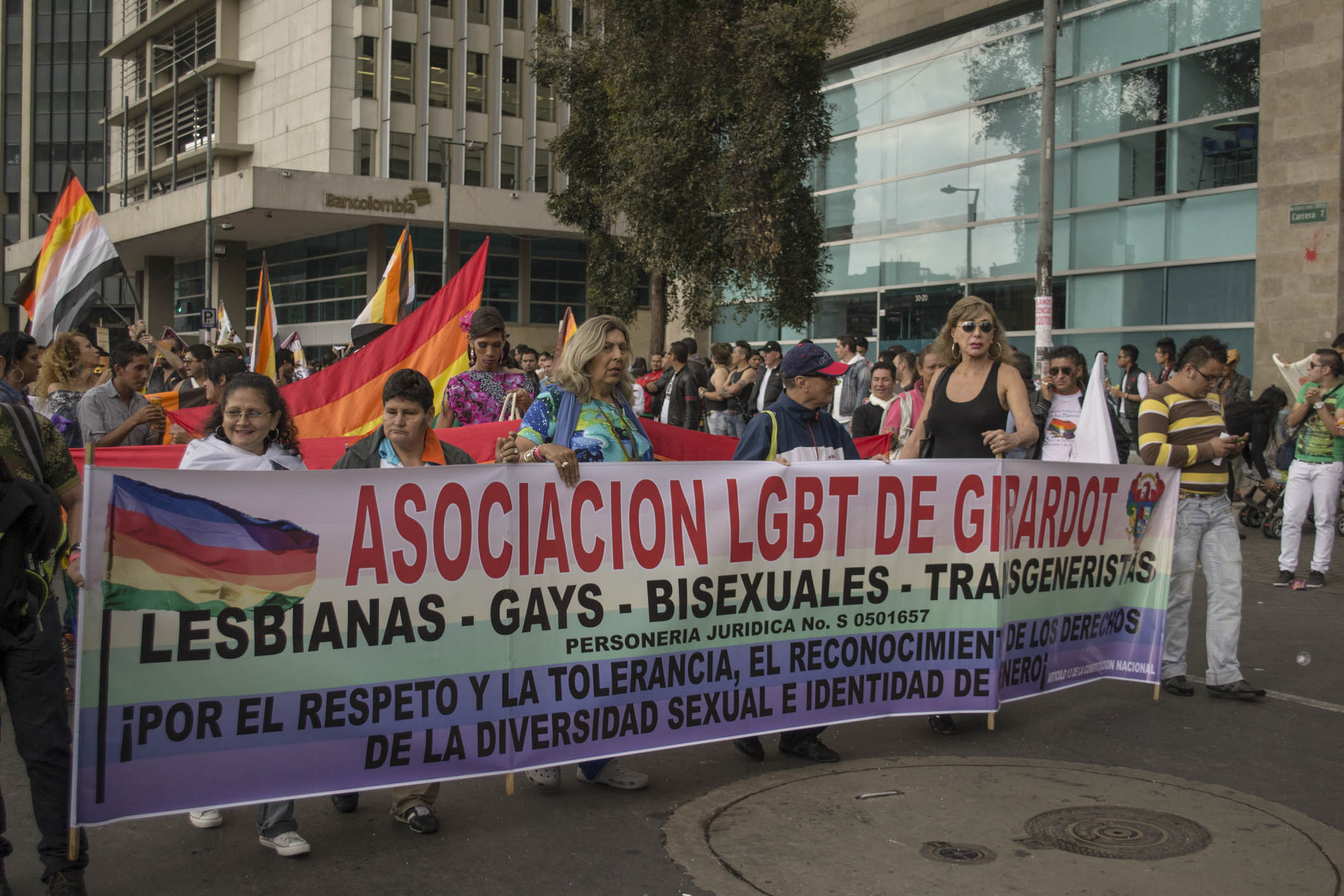
Participants at Bogotá Pride in June 2013 campaigning for LGBT rights and same-sex marriage

In March 2016, a draft of a ruling, considered to be a minority opinion of the Constitutional Court, was published by Judge Jorge Ignacio Pretelt. The draft argued that marriage applied only to "one man and one woman" and that this issue was a matter for Congress, and not the courts, to address. On 7 April 2016, the court voted 3–6 against the proposal. Judge Alberto Rojas Río was assigned to prepare a new proposal, which was expected to be in line with the court majority's view (i.e. to declare that prohibiting same-sex couples from getting married is unconstitutional). The court announced its decision on 28 April 2016, ruling by a 6–3 margin that "marriage between people of the same sex does not violate the constitutional order". The ruling established that every "solemn contract" entered into by same-sex couples since 20 June 2013 (under the provisions of the court's previous ruling in 2011) is legally valid and to be recognised as a marriage, meaning that couples who have entered into such unions since 20 June 2013 need not remarry as a result of the court's new ruling. The ruling was officially published on 7 July 2016.

Judge María Victoria Calle Correa wrote that "all people are free to choose independently to start a family in keeping with their sexual orientation... receiving equal treatment under the constitution and the law." The court's ruling informed state judges, notaries and clerks that they "must ensure that citizens' fundamental rights are observed and that they are all granted equal treatment." The first same-sex wedding following the ruling occurred in Cali on 24 May 2016 between Diego Fernando Quimbayo and José Manuel Ticora. The court ruled that the legal recognition of same-sex marriage was required by the Constitution of Colombia, and that Article 42, which had traditionally been interpreted as limiting the concept of the family to opposite-sex couples, should be understood as protecting a range of families, including same-sex couples. Article 42 states:

The family is the basic nucleus of society. It is formed on the basis of natural or legal ties, through the free decision of a man and woman to contract matrimony or through the responsible resolve to comply with it. (Note: Spanish: La familia es el núcleo fundamental de la sociedad. Se constituye por vínculos naturales o jurídicos, por la decisión libre de un hombre y una mujer de contraer matrimonio o por la voluntad responsable de conformarla.)

On 12 July 2016, the Constitutional Court rejected a challenge filed by a conservative group to nullify the ruling. Likewise, in January 2017, the court rejected a lawsuit filed by former Inspector General Alejandro Ordóñez Maldonado to overturn the decision. In 2025, the National Judicial Discipline Commission (Comisión Nacional de Disciplina Judicial) sanctioned a judge in Cartegena who had refused to marry same-sex couples for religious reasons in 2020. The commission sanctioned the judge with dismissal and general disqualification for a term of fifteen years. His sentence was reduced to one year of suspension in 2026, and a case filed by the judge alleging violation of due process was dismissed by the Council of State.

=== Statistics and notable weddings ===
Civil marriages are performed by notaries and judges. Every marriage performed in Colombia has to be registered with the National Civil Registry. According to the Superintendence of Notaries and Registrations, notaries performed 138 same-sex marriages in 2016, 341 in 2017 and 316 in 2018, with most occurring in Antioquia, Cundinamarca (including Bogotá), Valle del Cauca and Risaralda departments. By June 2019, 968 same-sex marriages had been performed by notaries in Colombia since legalization; 258 in Bogotá, 240 in Medellín, 92 in Cali, and 79 in Pereira. Six same-sex divorces occurred in 2017 and five in 2018. 1,703 same-sex marriages were performed in Colombia between 2016 and 2021, representing about 0.5% of all marriages. According to Colombia Diversa, 18,000 same-sex marriages had taken place in Colombia by June 2026.

In December 2019, the Superior Mayor of Bogotá, Claudia López Hernández, married her partner, Senator Angélica Lozano Correa, in one of the more notable same-sex marriages in Colombia.

=== Religious performance ===
The Catholic Church, the largest Christian denomination in Colombia, opposes same-sex marriage and does not allow its priests to officiate at such marriages. The Church has been strongly opposed to the legalization of same-sex marriage in Colombia. In 2009, the Archdiocese of Bogotá called same-sex unions "unacceptable" and criticized a Constitutional Court ruling recognizing the property rights of same-sex couples. In June 2013, the Metropolitan Archbishop of Bogotá, Rubén Salazar Gómez, argued that same-sex couples could not marry as the right to marriage is "based on fundamental laws of nature": "What is it that is being denied to the homosexual community? What is denied is something that doesn't belong to them, something they have no right to, because marriage and family are based on fundamental laws of nature." Salazar called on civil officiants to conscientiously object to performing same-sex marriages as these "contradict the will of the creator", and further incorrectly argued that the legalization of same-sex unions violated the Constitution of Colombia. In December 2023, the Holy See published Fiducia supplicans, a declaration allowing Catholic priests to bless couples who are not considered to be married according to church teaching, including the blessing of same-sex couples.

Some smaller religious denominations support and solemnize same-sex marriages, including the Old Catholic Churches of Colombia. In May 2009, a same-sex couple was married in an Old Catholic church in Bogotá. The Church had previously also married a same-sex couple in Medellín.

== Public opinion ==
A poll conducted between December 2009 and January 2010 in Bogotá showed that 63% of the city's population was in favor of legalizing same-sex marriage, while 36% was against it. The poll showed that women and people with a higher education level were more likely to support same-sex marriage.

A nationwide Ipsos poll conducted in November 2012 found that 28% of Colombians supported same-sex marriage, while 66% opposed it and 6% did not respond. According to a Pew Research Center survey conducted between 28 November 2013 and 4 March 2014, 28% of Colombians supported same-sex marriage, whereas 64% were opposed. Additionally, a Gallup poll conducted in July 2016 showed that 40% of Colombians supported same-sex marriage, while 57% were opposed. The 2017 AmericasBarometer showed that 34% of Colombians supported same-sex marriage, while a 2018 Gallup poll found that support for same-sex marriage had increased to 46%, with 52% of Colombians opposed.

In October 2019, an Invamer poll showed that support for same-sex marriage had, for the first time ever, reached 50%, with 47% opposing. 36% of respondents supported adoption by same-sex couples, while 62% opposed. A 2023 Ipsos poll showed that 49% of Colombians supported same-sex marriage, while 21% supported civil unions or other types of partnerships but not marriage, 18% were undecided and 12% were opposed to all recognition for same-sex couples.

== See also ==
- LGBTQ rights in Colombia
- Recognition of same-sex unions in the Americas
