= 2022 Cuban Family Code referendum =

- 25 September 2022
- Do you agree with the Family Code?
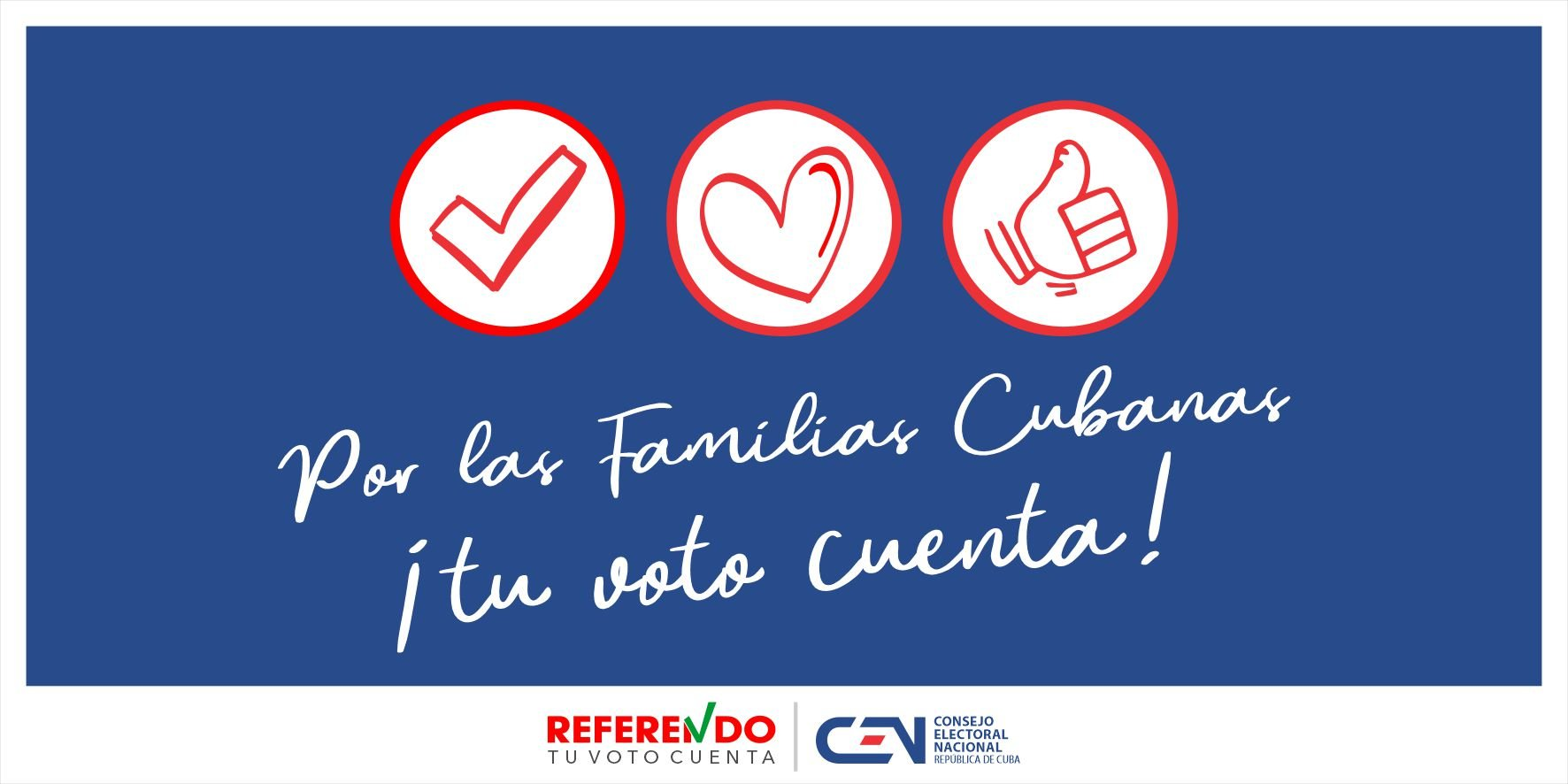

Results
Choice	Votes	%
Yes	3,950,288	66.85%
No	1,959,097	33.15%
Valid votes	5,909,385	94.26%
Invalid or blank votes	360,042	5.74%
Total votes	6,269,427	100.00%
Registered voters/turnout	8,457,978	74.12%
- Results by province

A referendum was held on 25 September 2022 in Cuba to approve amendments to the Family Code of the Cuban Constitution. The revised code contains stronger rules on gender equality and modernizes protections for women, children, the elderly and people with disabilities. Moreover, legal recognition is given to same-sex marriage and adoption and altruistic surrogacy. Following the code's approval, Cuba's family policies have been described as among the most progressive in Latin America.

== Background ==
Until 2019, Article 36 of the 1992 Constitution of Cuba defined marriage as "the voluntary union established between a man and a woman", making same-sex marriage constitutionally impermissible.

In December 2017, LGBTQ groups began a campaign to repeal the ban as part of the drafting process for the new constitution. On 4 May 2018, Mariela Castro announced proposals for legalizing same-sex marriage as part of the constitutional consultation process. On 21 July, the Council of State announced that the draft constitution would define marriage as a "union between two people". The National Assembly approved the draft on 22 July, and it was subject to public consultation between 13 August and 15 November 2018.

The issue of same-sex marriage triggered public debate and organization in Cuba. In June 2018, five Christian denominations declared same-sex marriage "contrary to the spirit of the communist revolution". In what was described as "a poster war", both opponents and supporters of same-sex marriage put up hundreds of posters around Havana. In September 2018, reacting to conservative opposition, President of the Council of State Miguel Díaz-Canel announced his support for same-sex marriage. In his first interview since taking office in April, he told Telesur that he supports "marriage between people without any restrictions", and is in favor of "eliminating any kind of discrimination in society".

Pressure from religious groups and deep-rooted conservatism in Cuban society resulted in the abandonment of the original definition of "a union between two people". The final draft of the new constitution was ratified by the National Assembly and defined marriage as a "social and legal institution" and "one of the forms of family organization", leaving marriage law a matter for the National Assembly. Mariela Castro said that same-sex marriage would be introduced separately as part of an update to the Family Code. The new constitution was approved in a referendum on 24 February 2019, with 90.6% in favor, and entered into force on 10 April of the same year. Article 82 of the new constitution states:

Marriage is a social and legal institution. It is one of the forms of family organization. It is based on the free consent and the equality of rights, obligations and legal capacity of the spouses. The law determines the form in which it is constituted and its effects.

== Preparations ==
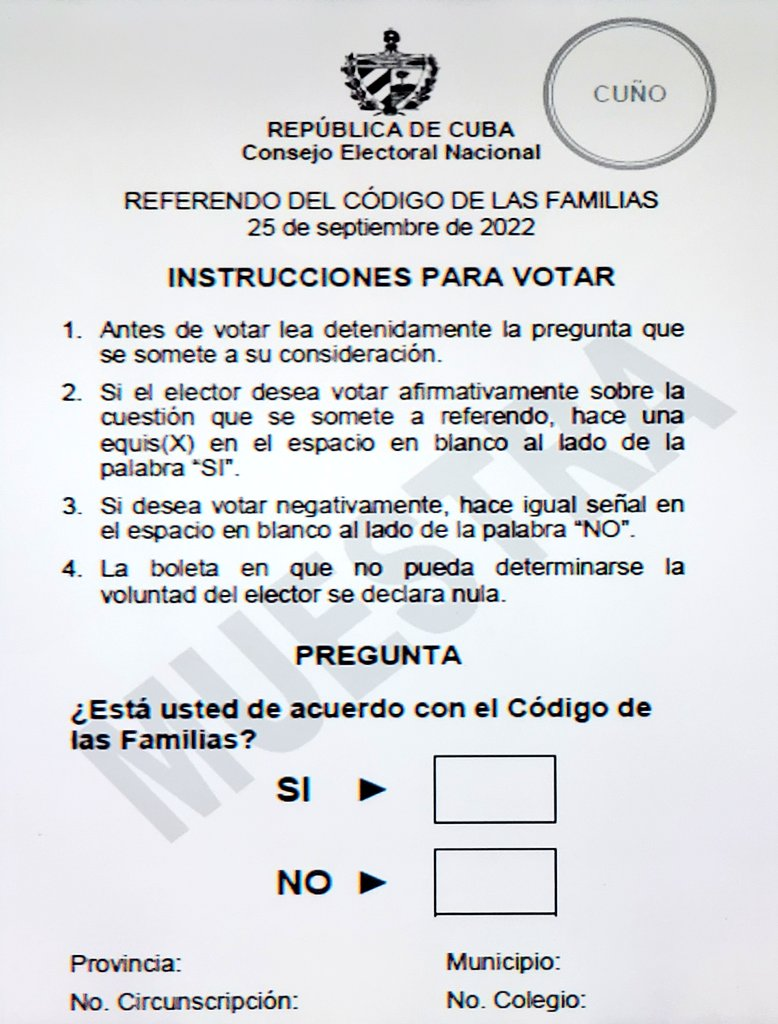
Ballot form which was used in the referendum

On 15 September 2021, the Cuban government published a draft of the new Family Code, which would legalize same-sex marriage. Article 61 of the draft code states that marriage is "the consensual union between two people" without reference to the sex of the parties. Likewise, parents are no longer defined by their sex; Articles 30 and 31 provide for same-sex adoption and explicitly grant the right of paternity to couples using assisted reproductive technology. The new code was well received by LGBT rights associations, although they remained cautious about the success of the changes. On 30 December 2021, a special commission was created to organize the referendum, headed by the diplomat Antonio Machín.

A public consultation process began on 15 February 2022. Some LGBTQ groups criticized the decision to call a referendum on the subject. The government responded that it preferred to implement the legislation with express public consent to avoid the perception of imposition by force. Several other countries in Latin America legalized same-sex marriage or civil unions in the same period, leading to protests from Cuba's LGBTQ community regarding the slow pace of change compared to nearby jurisdictions.

In addition to LGBTQ issues, the new Family Code also includes greater protection for children and adolescents, the joint responsibility of parents in their education, and strict equality in rights between men and women. The Code also guarantees minors the right not to be the object of exclusion, violence or parental neglect.

On 6 June 2022, version 25 of the Family Code was presented, reflecting the final results of the public consultation and including modifications to 48.73% of the articles.

== Opinion polls ==
Polling source	Date(s) conducted	Sample size (Proposals)	Yes	No	Undecided	Lead
Granma/PCC	1 February – 30 April 2022	434,860	61.96	–	–	–
Granma/PCC	1 February – 20 March 2022	About 225,000	54	–	–	–
Draft Family Code released
Apretaste (Note: Support for same-sex marriage)	July 2019	390	63.1	36.9	–	26.2

== Results ==
The vote commenced for Cuban nationals abroad on 18 September at around 1,000 polling stations worldwide, including at Cuban embassies and consulates, and voting commenced in Cuba itself at 07:00 CDT on 25 September. Polls closed in most of the country at 18:00, though voters in line at polling locations at that time were reportedly allowed to vote. Certain locations in Havana and Santiago de Cuba were allowed to stay open until 20:00 due to rains from the 2022 Atlantic hurricane season. The results were set to be released on 30 September by the National Electoral Council. However, preliminary exit polls showed that a majority of voters supported the proposals. The abstention rate of the referendum was 26%, higher than the abstention rate for the constitutional referendums of 1976 and 2019.

Choice	Votes	%
For	3,950,288	66.85
Against	1,959,097	33.15
Total	5,909,385	100.00
Valid votes	5,909,385	94.26
Invalid/blank votes	360,042	5.74
Total votes	6,269,427	100.00
Registered voters/turnout	8,457,978	74.12
Source: CEN, CEN

=== By province and equivalents ===
Province	For		Against	
Province	Votes	%	Votes	%
Pinar del Río	231,349	70.60	96,355	29.40
Artemisa	181,015	69.36	79,948	30.64
La Habana	709,920	69.99	304,372	30.01
Mayabeque	116,638	62.18	70,933	37.82
Matanzas	255,315	70.05	109,182	29.95
Villa Clara	280,610	66.53	141,162	33.47
Cienfuegos	152,833	72.15	58,986	27.85
Sancti Spíritus	184,078	68.54	84,478	31.46
Ciego de Ávila	176,449	71.60	69,974	28.40
Camagüey	271,382	66.03	139,611	33.97
Las Tunas	180,937	64.15	101,104	35.85
Holguín	289,271	53.58	250,580	46.42
Granma	323,070	70.07	137,999	29.93
Santiago de Cuba	392,099	68.66	178,963	31.34
Guantánamo	152,418	56.21	118,720	43.79
Isla de la Juventud	32,401	71.29	13,047	28.71
Overseas voters	20,503	84.77	3,683	15.23
Total valid votes	3,950,288	66.85	1,959,097	33.15
Source: Elecciones en Cuba

== See also ==
- Recognition of same-sex unions in the Americas
- Same-sex marriage in Cuba
- LGBT rights in Cuba
