= Presbyterianism and homosexuality =

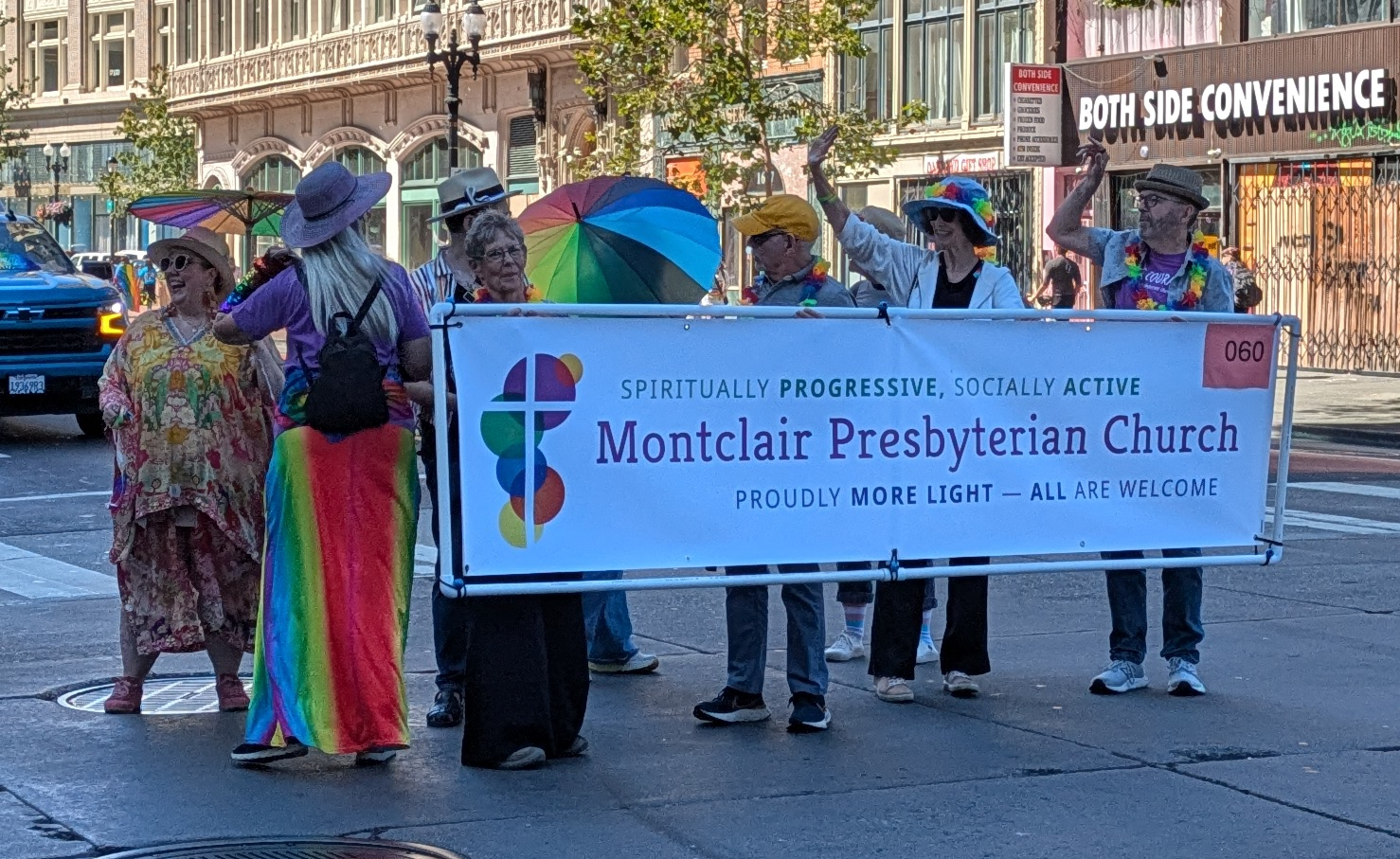
Montclair Presbyterian Church represented in a pride parade in Oakland, California, United States

In the Presbyterian branch of Protestant Christianity, attitudes toward homosexuality vary widely depending on geographic region and individual denomination, ranging from outright condemnation to complete acceptance. There is no one organization that represents all Presbyterians, allowing individual denominations to take unique positions on the topic of homosexuality. The largest association of Reformed Christian denominations, which includes Presbyterians, the World Communion of Reformed Churches, has not taken a position on the issue of homosexuality but includes denominations that affirm same-sex marriage.

== Denominations in favor of homosexual relationships ==
=== Church of Scotland ===
The "mother church" for Presbyterians worldwide, the Church of Scotland is still debating the issue of homosexuality. In 1994, the General Assembly received for consideration two reports, one from the Board of Social Responsibility on human sexuality ("placing questions of sexuality for people with...disabilities, elderly people, and homosexuality in the contexts of human sciences and Scripture"), and one from the Panel on Doctrine on marriage (concluding, "among other things, that cohabiting couples, whether heterosexual or homosexual, may well display all the marks of loving, faithful and committed partnership, and should not be thought sinful"). The Panel's Working Party was unanimous, but the larger Panel was not and had dissenting members, as did the Board's report. Neither became official church doctrine. The legalization of same-gender Civil Partnerships in Scotland in 2005 brought the issue to a head again, this time over the question of whether Church of Scotland ministers are allowed to conduct (and also have the right to decline to perform) union ceremonies between two persons of the same gender. The Assembly narrowly passed legislation to permit civil blessings. In 2011, the General Assembly of the Church of Scotland voted to allow openly gay ministers, provided those ministers were inducted into the Church of Scotland before May 2009. However, it imposed a moratorium on openly gay ministers being newly inducted into the Kirk until May 2013. During its May 2013 annual meeting the question of ordaining openly gay ministers was again discussed. As an effort to build common ground between the generally opposing "traditionalists" and generally affirming "revisionists", the General Assembly made a decision for the Church to maintain its historic doctrine in relation to human sexuality but, to permit individual Kirk Sessions (local congregations) to call a homosexual minister in a civil partnership if they choose to do so. Questions regarding a mechanism by which conflict between the local Kirk wishing to ordain a homosexual minister and its overseeing Presbytery (which aims to maintain church doctrine) were referred to committee and the question will be further discussed at the 2014 general assembly. In 2015, the General Assembly of the Church of Scotland voted in favour of appointing and accepting gay ministers who entered into same-sex marriages. On May 25, 2017, the General Assembly of the Church of Scotland officially backed a Theological Forum report calling for approval of same-sex marriage and an apology to homosexuals for past mistreatment. While the apology immediately went into effect, no timeline was set for allowing gay marriages and it was acknowledged that same-sex marriages would still not be allowed in Church of Scotland churches until at least the 2018 assembly. In May 2018, the General Assembly passed a vote by 345 to 170, for a motion which tasked a committee with drafting church law on the issue of same-sex marriage. Its legal question committee has been asked to report back to the decision-making body in 2020.

=== Presbyterian Church in Canada ===
The Presbyterian Church in Canada has had a conservative view on the subject in the past. A 2002 report summarized its position by noting that the church "opposes any attitude of hatred or discrimination directed at homosexual people, the Church believes its task is to lead all people to the grace and mercy of Jesus Christ, the Church has accepted the biblical norm of male and female, and the Church has called for chastity...outside the bond of marriage." It notes that "there are lesbian and gay people holding positions of responsibility in the [PCC], people of homosexual orientation are able to have all the privileges of church membership, and [that the PCC] still needs to examine the issues around ordination." The PCC did not approve of same-sex marriages at the time the Civil Marriage Act was passed, and it stated that position to the Canadian government in 2005.

However, the stance of the PCC has changed in recent years. The 145th General Assembly in June 2019 adopted two recommendations: that presbyteries under the Barrier Act may hold parallel definitions of marriage being "a covenant relationship between a man and a woman or as a covenant relationship between two adult persons", and that LGBTQI persons may be ordained as ministers and ruling elders. The recommendations were approved by the General Assembly in 2021.

=== Presbyterian Church (USA) ===
For decades members of the LGBTQ community have been welcomed as members in the Presbyterian Church. Since 2011, The Presbyterian Church (U.S.A.), the largest U.S. Presbyterian body, welcomes gay and lesbian persons to serve in leadership positions as ministers, deacons, elders, and trustees within the church based on the discernment of individual ordaining bodies. This is referred to as home rule and does not make ordination of LGBTQ persons a mandated denominational standard. This is a change from the denominational standard added to the denomination's constitution, The Book of Order, first proposed in 1994, that stated:

Those who are called to office in the church are to lead a life in obedience to Scripture and in conformity to the historic confessional standards of the church. Among these standards is the requirement to live either in fidelity within the covenant of marriage between a man and a woman, or chastity in singleness. Persons refusing to repent of any self-acknowledged practice which the confessions call sin shall not be ordained and / or installed as deacons, elders, or ministers of the Word and Sacrament (G-6.0106b).

This paragraph, often referred to by its pre-ratification designation "Amendment B", was ratified by a majority of presbyteries in 1997 and was in large part inspired by definitive guidance documents issued by the PC(USA)'s predecessor denominations, the UPCUSA in 1978 and the PCUS in 1980. Different attempts to remove or soften this language have been unsuccessful. Individual ministers are permitted to bless same-sex unions, but the Church does not permit same-sex marriages, and does not explicitly support the consummation of these unions. In 2001, the General Assembly ordered the formation of a Theological Task Force on the Peace, Unity and Purity of the Church. The members were chosen to reflect the diversity of opinion within the church. Its final report was approved by the 2006 General Assembly in Birmingham. The task force made seven recommendations:

1. The General Assembly should strongly encourage all members "to witness to the church's visible oneness, to avoid division into separate denominations, and to live in harmony with [fellow] members; and for congregations, Sessions, presbyteries and synods to strengthen their relationships with each other.
2. The church should seek to engage in "intensive discernment" in the face of difficult issues using techniques used by the Task Force itself.
3. The General Assembly should commend for study the Theological Reflection of the report.
4. The church should consider alternative forms of decisionmaking than the usual Robert's Rules of Order with highly divisive issues.
5. The General Assembly should issue an Authoritative Interpretation (AI) that upholds the Book of Confessions and Book of Order as the constitutional standards for ordination and installation, while noting that ordaining bodies (Sessions for elders and deacons, Presbyteries for Ministers of Word and Sacrament) have the responsibility to apply these standards to candidates and include in its determinations:
  - "Whether the candidate...has departed from scriptural and constitutional standards for fitness for office,"
  - "Whether any departure constitutes a failure to adhere to the essentials of the Reformed faith and polity under...The Book of Order," and
  - "Whether the examination and...decision comply with the Constitution of the PC(USA), and whether the ordaining/installing body has conducted its examination reasonably, responsibly, prayerfully, and deliberately in deciding to ordain a candidate for church office...subject to review by higher governing bodies
6. Should the AI pass, that the GA not approve in 2006 any other AIs or constitutional amendments relating to the issues included in the Task Force's report, and that all church members should "acknowledge their traditional biblical obligation...to conciliate, mediate, and adjust differences without strife."
7. Related to number 6 above, that the Task Force Report should be considered as answering the questions raised by several overtures to the General Assembly that year.

The Task Force Report and the AI passed the General Assembly on June 20, 2006.

In November 1994, an individual PC(USA) church and Presbyterian Renewal Ministries sponsored a conference called "The Path to Freedom: Exploring healing for the Homosexual." This conference focused on both how to minister to those “struggling" with homosexuality and to teach those in the church how to support them. A few months later, OneByOne was organized. OneByOne is an ex-gay organization whose aim is to "educate the Church and minister to members" in regards to "sexual brokenness", of which they include homosexuality. Other groups advocate the full inclusion of LGBT persons in the life and work of the church, including More Light Presbyterians, dating to 1974, and the Covenant Network of Presbyterians (formed in the aftermath of the ratification of Amendment B). All three of these groups are considered advocacy groups, separate from the PC(USA) and do not speak on behalf of the denomination.

At the General Assembly of 2004 an overture to consider adoption of the Belhar Confession was approved. That confession was written by the Dutch Reformed Mission Church in South Africa in response to apartheid. Some controversy exists as to whether its principles in the American context relate to the issue of sexual orientation. The 2008 General Assembly was to consider adoption but because the report to the assembly was incomplete in 2008 a new report on adoption is expected in 2010.

The 2008 General Assembly, taking under serious consideration the report of the Peace, Unity and Purity of the Church Task Force, decided to remove many (if not all) of the definitive guidance standards, authoritative interpretations, and church-court cases concerning homosexuality that were seen by full-inclusion advocates as stumbling blocks to homosexual ordination. The Assembly also took steps to remove "Amendment B" (G6.0106b) from the constitution by sending to the presbyteries a vote to alter amendment B and replace it with wording that does not implicitly or explicitly bar homosexuals from ordination. Further changes to the governance of the denomination came in the adoption of a separate authoritative interpretation which allowed for homosexual individuals to "scruple" or challenge the restrictions of homosexual ordination before governing bodies of the church and be allowed ordination at which point the governing body may accept or refuse the challenge. The process for correcting the Heidelberg Catechism, which is part of the constitution of the denomination, was also begun. The correction will remove the improper 1962 "translation" of the original document which illicitly added homosexuality to its list of sins. The 2010 General Assembly will have to receive and approve a report for the change and send to the presbyteries to receive a two-thirds approval for change in 2012.

On July 8, 2010, by a vote of 373 to 323, the General Assembly voted to approve the so-called Amendment 10-A to permit the ordination of partnered gays and lesbians. The measure required ratification by a majority vote among the 173 Presbyteries before taking effect. On May 10, 2011, a majority of Presbyteries ratified Amendment 10-A. The deciding vote was cast by the Presbytery of Twin Cities; 19 presbyteries that voted against a previous such amendment changed sides. The new policy, which overrides a policy reserving clergy status to people "living in fidelity within the covenant of marriage between a man and a woman or chastity in singleness," took effect on July 10, 2011. Immediately thereafter, a new denomination, the Evangelical Covenant Order of Presbyterians, was formed for the congregations that wanted to leave the PC(USA).

The Presbyterian Church (USA) voted to allow same-gender marriages on 19 June 2014 during its 221st General Assembly, making it one of the largest Christian denominations in the world to openly accept same-sex unions. This vote effectively lifted a previous ban and allows pastors to perform marriages in jurisdictions where it is legal. Additionally, the Assembly voted to send out a proposed amendment to the Book of Order that would change the definition of marriage from "between a man and a woman" to "between two people, traditionally between a man and a woman." This amendment needed to be approved by a majority of the 171 Presbyteries to take effect. It was approved by a majority of the 171 Presbyteries in March 2015, and so it was included in the church's Book of Order, taking effect on June 21, 2015.

=== United Church of Canada ===
The United Church of Canada, formed in 1925 with 70% of Canadian Presbyterians along with Congregationalists and Methodists, welcomes LGBT members into active membership and does not bar LGBT candidates to the ministry. It allows same-gender marriage ceremonies to be performed by its ministers and opposes repeal of the Civil Marriage Act that allows persons of the same gender to be married.

=== Others ===
Many Presbyterians in New Zealand are active in the Association for Reconciling Christians and Congregations, an ecumenical group that supports the full inclusion and participation of all people in the Church, including gay and lesbian persons.

In America, More Light Presbyterians, a coalition of gay-inclusive congregations, was founded in 1980. Today the organization has 113 member churches, while many more informally endorse its mission to more fully welcome people of all sexualities into the life of the church.

An ecclesiastical court for the Uniting Presbyterian Church in Southern Africa declared that "the Presbyterian church allows gay marriage" and that pastors may exercise their consciences.

== Denominations opposing homosexual activity ==
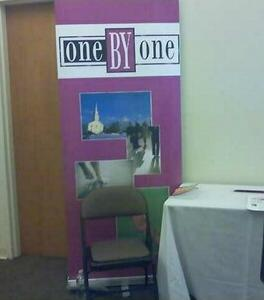
One By One booth at a Love Won Out conference

Other American Presbyterian bodies, such as the Presbyterian Church in America, the Evangelical Presbyterian Church (United States), the Associate Reformed Presbyterian Church, and the Orthodox Presbyterian Church condemn same-sex sexual behavior as incompatible with Biblical morality, with the Evangelical Presbyterian Church (United States), the Presbyterian Church in America, and the Orthodox Presbyterian Church also viewing homosexual orientation as itself sinful.

In Australia, the Presbyterian Church of Australia, declared homosexual practices to be sin in 1994, while in 2007 it called on the government to amend the Sex Discrimination Act "in such a way as to prevent same-sex partners and singles from continuing to access artificial reproductive technology."

In New Zealand the Presbyterian Church of Aotearoa New Zealand has debated homosexuality for many years. In 1985, its General Assembly declared, "Homosexual acts are sinful." The most recent decision of the Assembly in 2004 declared "this church may not accept ...anyone involved in a sexual relationship outside of faithful marriage between a man and a woman," but added the lemma, "In relation to homosexuality... this ruling shall not prejudice anyone, who as at the date of this meeting, has been accepted for training, licensed ordained of inducted."

In Brazil, the Presbyterian Church of Brazil (Igreja Presbiteriana do Brasil) is against gay practice. Given recent laws, the Presbyterian Church of Brazil published an article stating its position against these themes, leaving clear its opposition to both abortion (except those performed to save the life of the pregnant) and homosexuality.

In 2011 the conservative National Presbyterian Church in Mexico put an end on the 139-year-old relationship with the PC(USA) over the issue of gay ordination, and in the same meeting the Mexican Presbyterian Church rejected woman ordination.

The Presbyterian Church of India is strongly against homosexuality.

In Ireland, the Presbyterian Church in Ireland is opposed to LGBT rights and same-sex marriage. In June 2018, it voted that individuals in same-sex marriages cannot be full members of the church, and cannot have their children baptised. It has also sanctioned some liberal ministers and congregations.

All 150 Presbyterian denominations in Korea including the two largest, Tonghap and Hapdong, denominations are vehemently against what they view as homosexual "sins". While denominations such as the Tonghap do not prevent homosexuals from becoming church members, some conservative denominations stipulate in their constitutions that pastors can order the expulsion of homosexual church members.

The Presbyterian Church of Colombia prohibits same-sex marriage.

In 2014, the General Assembly of the Presbyterian Church in Taiwan issued a statement declared homosexuality is against the Bible and homosexual orientation is not born with.

OneByOne is a Presbyterian ex-gay organization whose mission is both to minister to the "sexually broken" and serve as a source to those trying to support them, with an emphasis on homosexuality. The idea for OneByOne started as a result of a conference held in November 1994 by a PC(USA) church and the Presbyterian Renewal Ministries entitled "The Path to Freedom: Exploring healing for the Homosexual." In January 1995 the Presbyterian Renewal Network held a meeting to discuss what could be done, at which time they created OneByOne. In July 2003, it joined with 10 other organization that serve people conflicted over unwanted homosexual attractions to form a coalition called Positive Alternatives to Homosexuality.

== See also ==
- Homosexuality and Christianity
- Presbyterian
- Presbyterian Church (USA)
- More Light Presbyterians
- OneByOne
- Sexual orientation change efforts
