= Divorce of same-sex couples =

The extension of civil marriage, union, and domestic partnership rights to same-sex couples in various jurisdictions can raise legal issues upon dissolution of these unions that are not experienced by opposite-sex couples, especially if law of their residence or nationality does not have same-sex marriage or partnerships.

== Conflict of laws ==
In jurisdictions where same-sex unions are not possible, also divorce or annulment is often not possible, while general conflict of law rules sometimes exclude divorce in the jurisdiction where the marriage was celebrated.

In Aruba (marriages from the Netherlands only) and Israel, divorce is possible, even if marriage is not possible.

=== United States ===
Marriages and divorces in the U.S. are governed by state law, not federal law. That means that states are free to set their own rules for who is eligible for marriage (e.g., the minimum age for marrying) and establish their own rules and processes for divorce. Nonetheless, every state had a general residency requirement for divorce cases, requiring at least one of the people seeking the divorce to reside in that state. Before the federal government recognized same-sex marriages in 2013, through the Supreme Court's decision in United States v. Windsor, same-sex couples who legally married in one state could find themselves unable to divorce after relocating to another state that did not recognize their marriage as valid. That could result in the need for a costly civil lawsuit to attempt to resolve issues of property rights, and property settlements that were negotiated outside of court could potentially trigger federal gift tax requirements.

Before the Supreme Court's 2015 decision in Obergefell v. Hodges, couples in same-sex marriages could generally only obtain a divorce in jurisdictions that recognized same-sex marriages. When Delaware and Minnesota legalized same-sex marriage in May 2013, they passed legislation allowing non-resident couples who had legally married within the state, but who were not able to divorce in the jurisdiction where they were residing, to obtain a divorce through their courts. Florida legalized divorce for same sex couples as the result of a court decision that followed lawsuits by couples who had legally married in other states but had not been allowed to divorce after relocating to Florida.

After the Supreme Court's decision in Obergefell, same-sex couples could legally divorce in any U.S. state.

== Divorce rates ==
Divorce rates of marriages with same-sex partners vary by nation.

=== Netherlands ===
Between 2004 and 2009, the average annual divorce rate for all homosexual marriages was almost 2% (the total rate of divorce over those five years was 11%). Also between 2004 and 2009, lesbian divorce rates were nearly double of those of gay men.

In the Netherlands, slightly more marriages between women are recorded than between men: between 2006 and 2011 on average 690 and 610 per year respectively.

The lesbian divorce rate is much higher than the divorce rate between men: in the same period on average 100 women and 45 men divorced per year (i.e., lesbian divorce rate = 14%, gay male divorce rate = 7%).

=== Denmark ===
In 1997, the same-sex partnership divorce rate (17 percent) was significantly lower than that of heterosexual couples in Denmark (46 percent), though this information may be outdated.

Female same-sex marriages account for around 60% of same-sex marriages annually, whereas female same-sex divorce accounts for around 70% of same-sex marriage dissolutions annually, as of 2022.

=== Norway and Sweden ===
A 2022 study of Norway, using data up to 2018, found that divorce rates 20 years post-marriage were 5% lower for male-male marriages compared to male-female marriages and were 29% higher for female-female marriages vs female-male marriages.

Another study on short-term same-sex registered partnerships in Norway and Sweden found that divorce rates were higher for same-sex couples than opposite-sex marriages, and that unions of lesbians are considerably less stable than unions of gay men.

In the above study, lesbians' divorce risks were 10% higher than for gay men.

A study of marriage dissolution rates in Sweden spanning the years 1995–2012 found that 30% of both male same-sex marriages and heterosexual marriages ended in divorce, whereas the separation rate for female same-sex marriages was 40% (their Figure 7a).

=== United Kingdom ===
The divorce rate of same-sex couples within 29 months of the introduction of legally binding civil partnerships was slightly less than one percent in the United Kingdom.

As of 2013, lesbian couples were twice as likely to initiate actions to end legally recognized partnerships as compared to gay men. In 2016, married female couples were approximately 2.5 times more likely to divorce than male couples.

According to Office for National Statistics, divorce rate of heterosexual couples is at its lowest since 1973 in England and Wales. The divorce rate for same-sex couples increased in 2016 and 2017, which the Office for National Statistics explained as a likely result of the fact that same-sex marriages have only been legal since 2014.

=== United States ===
Massachusetts, the first U.S. state to allow same-sex marriage, doesn't track how many of the divorces in the state are between same-sex couples. A 2011 study for states with available data initially reported that the dissolution rates for same-sex couples were slightly lower on average (on average, 1.1% of all same-sex couples were said to divorce each year, ranging from 0% to 1.8% in various jurisdictions) than divorce rates of different-sex couples (2% of whom divorce annually). The Washington Post retracted a headline about this report, since the study had incorrectly calculated the percentage from an error in capturing when the same-sex marriages began. As a result, the corrected findings show a 2% divorce rate for same-sex couples—the same as opposite-sex couples.

== See also ==
- Status of same-sex marriage, status around the world
- Civil solidarity pact, French civil unions, available to same-sex and opposite-sex couples
- Civil union, Domestic partnership, other non-marriage legal unions available to same-sex couples in certain jurisdictions
