= Same-sex marriage in Uruguay =

Same-sex marriage has been legal in Uruguay since August 5, 2013. The Chamber of Representatives passed a bill for legalization on December 12, 2012, with a vote of 81–6. The Senate approved the bill 23–8 with some minor amendments on April 2, 2013, which the Chamber accepted on April 10 by 71 votes to 21. The law was signed by President José Mujica on May 3, and took effect on August 5. Polling indicates that a majority of Uruguayans support the legal recognition of same-sex marriage. Uruguay was the third country in South America, after Argentina and Brazil, and the fourteenth in the world to legalize same-sex marriage.

On January 20, 2008, Uruguay became the first Latin American country to enact a national civil union law. Civil unions provide same-sex couples with several, but not all, of the rights and benefits of marriage.

== Civil unions ==
A civil union bill was first proposed in Uruguay in 2000 by Representative Washington Abdala, though the bill was never brought up for debate in the General Assembly of Uruguay. On January 20, 2008, Uruguay became the first Latin American country to enact a national civil union law. The law, proposed by Senator Margarita Percovich of the Broad Front, was passed in the Chamber of Representatives on November 29, 2007, after having been passed in a similar form in the Senate in 2006. The amended version was passed by the Senate on December 18, and signed into law by President Tabaré Vázquez on December 27. It was published in the official journal on January 10, 2008, and came into effect on January 20. The first union was performed on April 17, 2008. Both same-sex and opposite-sex couples are allowed to enter into civil unions (Spanish: unión concubinaria, pronounced [uˈnjoŋ koŋkuβiˈnaɾja]) after having lived together for at least five years, and are entitled to most of the benefits afforded to married couples, including social security entitlements, inheritance rights and joint ownership of goods and property.

A government-backed bill allowing same-sex couples to adopt children was discussed in Parliament in the spring of 2008, receiving the support of President Vázquez and fierce opposition from the Catholic Church. The bill was approved 40–13 by the Chamber of Representatives on August 27, 2009, and by the Senate on September 9 with a 17–6 vote. It was signed into law by Vázquez on September 18, 2009, making Uruguay the first country in South America to allow same-sex couples to jointly adopt.

== Same-sex marriage ==
Recognition of same-sex unions in South America Marriage Other type of partnership Unrecognized Constitution limits marriage to opposite-sex couples Same-sex sexual activity illegal, though penalties not enforced

=== Legislative action ===
On May 25, 2009, Senator Margarita Percovich announced that if the Broad Front won the national elections in October 2009 it would introduce a same-sex marriage bill to the General Assembly. In October, the Broad Front won an absolute majority in both chambers of the General Assembly and José Mujica, the Broad Front presidential candidate, won the presidential election on November 29, 2009. In July 2010, Broad Front legislators announced plans to submit a bill to legalise same-sex marriage. Michelle Suárez Bértora, the first transgender attorney in Uruguay, assisted in drafting the same-sex marriage legislation as part of her work with the LGBT rights organization Black Sheep (Ovejas Negras). Debate on the legalization of same-sex marriage gained traction in July 2010 following legalization in Argentina. In April 2011, Sebastián Sabini, a legislator of the Movement of Popular Participation, one of the parties consisting the Broad Front, presented a bill allowing same-sex couples to marry. It was formally submitted to the Chamber of Representatives on September 6, 2011. The proposal was supported by most government lawmakers and some opposition members, including former President Julio María Sanguinetti from the Colorado Party. Former President Luis Alberto Lacalle from the National Party stated his opposition to the legalization of same-sex marriage. The Roman Catholic Church also issued a public statement opposing the proposed law.

In June 2012, Judge María Cristina Crespo of the Family Court of Appeals recognized a same-sex marriage conducted in Spain, ruling that local laws permitted same-sex marriage and that same-sex couples who had married abroad could have their marriage recognized under Uruguayan law. Judge Cristina Crespo overturned a lower court ruling from 2011 that had denied the recognition. However, the ruling was appealed. The issue was mooted upon Uruguay's legalization of same-sex marriage in August 2013, and recognition of foreign same-sex marriages was explicitly codified into law in 2020, ensuring that same-sex marriages conducted abroad may be recognized in Uruguay.

In June 2012, Minister of Education and Culture Ricardo Ehrlich announced that the same-sex marriage bill would be debated in the Parliament before the end of 2012. On July 4, the Chamber of Representatives' Constitutional and Legislative Affairs Committee began debating the legislation. The committee preliminarily approved the legislation on November 28, and amended it and gave final approval on December 5. On December 12, the Chamber of Representatives approved the bill by a vote of 81–6 with no abstentions. All present Broad Front and Colorado Party lawmakers voted in favor, as did 25 National Party representatives. Although the Broad Front called for the Senate to approve the bill by the end of 2012, it agreed to postpone the final vote until 2013 after opposition lawmakers threatened to vote against the bill if a vote was fast-tracked. The Senate's Constitutional and Legislative Affairs Committee passed the measure with some amendments on March 19, 2013. One of these amendments established a marriageable age at 16 regardless of gender and sexual orientation, while others concerned matters of adoption and filiation, including allowing married lesbian couples to access assisted reproduction technology. The Senate approved the amended bill 23–8 on April 2. Catholic groups organized a protest march against same-sex marriage on April 8, with about 200 people participating. The bill returned to the Chamber of Representatives in its amended form, where it was approved in a 71–21 vote on April 10. A majority of National Party lawmakers voted against the bill citing opposition to the Senate's modifications on filiation. The measure was signed into law by President José Mujica on May 3, and took effect on August 5, 2013.

April 2, 2013 vote in the Senate
Party	Voted for	Voted against	Abstained
G Broad Front	16: Milton Antognazza; Danilo Astori; Carmen Beramendi; Herbert Clavijo; Alberto Couriel; Gonzalo Fernández; Antonio Galicchio; Eduardo Lorier; Rafael Michelini; Daniel Montiel; Constanza Moreira; Walter Morodo; Rodolfo Nin Novoa; Enrique Obispo; Héctor Tajam; Lucía Topolansky	–	–
National Party	3: Luis Alberto Héber; Jorge Larrañaga; Gustavo Penadés	7: Sergio Abreu; Juan Chiruchi; Eber da Rosa; Francisco Gallinal; Carlos Moreira; Ana Lía Piñeyrúa; Jorge Saravia	–
Colorado Party	4: José Amorín Batlle; Ope Pasquet; Conrado Rodríguez; Tabaré Viera	1: Alfredo Solari	–
Total (Note: While the Senate has 30 seats, the President of the Senate, Danilo Astori, also cast a vote in favor of the measure.)	23	8	0
Total	74.2%	25.8%	0.0%

The law amended article 83 of the Uruguayan Civil Code to state:

El matrimonio civil es la unión permanente, con arreglo a la ley, de dos personas de distinto o igual sexo.

(Civil marriage is the permanent union, in accordance with the law, of two people of different or the same sex.)

The law contained some drafting and regulatory inconsistencies, including on registry and administrative procedures and cross-references to other laws. On July 2, 2013, the Senate voted 15–7 in favor of legislation correcting errors in the original text, harmonising the marriage law with existing legislation and ensuring that it could be legally implemented without challenges. The Chamber of Deputies followed suit 53–3 on July 24. Minister Ehrlich subsequently signed a regulatory decree on July 26 implementing the changes. Uruguay was the third country in South America, after Argentina and Brazil, and the fourteenth in the world to legalize same-sex marriage. The first same-sex marriage took place on August 5. The wedding was officiated in extremis at a hospital in Montevideo.

Presidential candidate Luis Lacalle Pou stated in an interview with El País in October 2018 that despite having voted against the same-sex marriage law as a national representative, should he be elected president his government would not overturn the same-sex marriage law. Lacalle Pou was elected president in the 2019 general election. In 2024, he attended a same-sex wedding in Maldonado as a guest.

=== Statistics ===
In the first year after the same-sex marriage law came into effect, 134 same-sex couples had married in Montevideo and the surrounding metropolitan area. Approximately 200 same-sex couples had married in the whole country during the same period.

In 2016, estimates from the Faculty of Social Sciences at the University of the Republic showed that about 60.3% of relationships in Uruguay were married opposite-sex couples, 38.4% unmarried opposite-sex couples, 0.6% opposite-sex couples in civil unions, 0.2% married same-sex couples, 0.5% unmarried same-sex couples and 0.1% same-sex couples in civil unions. These numbers remained relatively unchanged in 2017. The estimates also showed that unemployment among same-sex partners stood at 3.4% (compared to 4.7% among heterosexual partners) and that same-sex partners were more likely to have completed tertiary education (41%, compared to 19% among heterosexual partners). 2023 data from the National Statistics Institute (INE) showed that 4,759 people were married to a person of the same sex. The odd number may due to the INE not counting foreigners in the statistics.

=== Religious performance ===
The Catholic Church opposes same-sex marriage and does not allow its priests to officiate at such marriages. The Episcopal Conference of Uruguay campaigned heavily against legalization in 2013 warning of "a weakening of family values". The Bishop of Salto, Pablo Galimberti, called the law "a hard blow to marriage and the family", while the Diocese of Minas issued a statement describing the law as "a very serious injustice". These statements drew criticism from proponents of the legislation, including Representative Fernando Amado who said "it would be good for them [the Catholic Church] to call for a march of forgiveness. The Catholic Church has been a machine for violating human rights throughout its existence." In December 2023, the Holy See published Fiducia supplicans, a declaration allowing Catholic priests to bless couples who are not considered to be married according to church teaching, including the blessing of same-sex couples. The Archbishop of Montevideo, Daniel Sturla, said he would personally not offer blessings to same-sex couples. The first blessing occurred at a church in Garzón in February 2024. The couple, Carlos Perciavalle and Jimmy Castilhos, received the blessing from Father Francisco Gordalina.

Some smaller Christian denominations authorise the blessing of same-sex unions. The Waldensian Evangelical Church of the River Plate became the first denomination in Uruguay to do so in 2006. Similarly, the Evangelical Methodist Church in Uruguay allows its clergy to bless same-sex civil marriages.

== Public opinion ==
A Factum poll conducted in November 2011 found that 52% of the population supported same-sex marriage, 32% were opposed, 10% were neutral and 6% had no opinion. According to a Cifra poll conducted between November 29 and December 6, 2012, 53% of Uruguayans supported same-sex marriage, 32% were opposed and 15% had no opinion. The survey also showed that support for same-sex marriage was highest among Broad Front voters (62%), and lower among voters from the Colorado Party and the National Party (both 42%). Another Cifra poll, conducted between February 22 and March 4, 2013, found that 54% of respondents supported same-sex marriage, 32% were opposed, 9% were undecided and 4% had no opinion.

According to a Pew Research Center survey conducted between November 22, 2013, and January 8, 2014, 62% of Uruguayans supported same-sex marriage, while 31% were opposed.

According to the 2014 AmericasBarometer, 71% of Uruguayans were in favour of same-sex marriage. This level of support was the second highest among the 28 American countries polled, behind only Canada. 53% of respondents "strongly" supported same-sex marriage, while 17% "strongly" opposed it; with the remaining being "somewhat" in support or in opposition or had no opinion. Additionally, support was highest among young people: 79% and 80% of 18–25-year-olds and 26–35-year-olds supported same-sex marriage, respectively. Among people over the age of 66, support was 51%. The 2017 AmericasBarometer showed that 75% of Uruguayans supported same-sex marriage, while the 2023 Latinobarómetro showed that support had increased to 78%, while 20% were opposed and 2% were undecided or had refused to answer.

== See also ==
- LGBT rights in Uruguay
- Recognition of same-sex unions in the Americas
