= Recognition of same-sex unions in the Americas =

Many countries in the Americas grant legal recognition to same-sex unions, with almost 85 percent of people in both North America and South America living in jurisdictions providing marriage rights to same-sex couples.

In North America, same-sex marriages are recognized and performed without restrictions in Canada, Costa Rica, Cuba, Mexico, and the United States. (Note: Excluding certain Native American tribes. Same-sex marriage is legal in at least 42 of them.)

Same-sex marriages are also performed in the Dutch territories of Aruba, Curacao, Bonaire, Sint Eustatius and Saba, the Danish autonomous territory of Greenland, and in all French overseas departments and collectivities (Guadeloupe, Martinique, Saint Barthélemy, Saint Martin and Saint Pierre and Miquelon). Furthermore, Sint Maarten recognizes same-sex marriages performed in the Netherlands. The British Territories of Bermuda and the Cayman Islands also perform civil partnerships.

In South America, same-sex marriages are recognized and performed without restrictions in Argentina, Brazil, Chile, Colombia, Ecuador and Uruguay as well as the jurisdictions of French Guiana, the Falkland Islands and South Georgia and the South Sandwich Islands. Free unions that are equivalent to marriage have begun to be recognized in Bolivia.

== Maps ==
Recognition of same-sex unions in North America Marriage Other type of partnership

States, provinces, and territories performing civil unions in North America Gender-neutral civil unions. Former civil unions for same-sex couples, replaced by marriage. Civil unions never performed.

Recognition of same-sex unions in South America Marriage Other type of partnership Unrecognized Constitution limits marriage to opposite-sex couples Same-sex sexual activity illegal, though penalties not enforced

Countries performing civil unions in South America Gender-neutral civil unions. Civil unions for opposite-sex couples only. Civil unions never performed.

Homosexuality laws in Central America and the Caribbean Islands. Same-sex marriage Other type of partnership Unregistered cohabitation No recognition of same-sex couples Constitution limits marriage to opposite-sex couples Same-sex sexual activity illegal but law not enforced

Countries performing civil unions in Central America and the Caribbean Islands Gender-neutral civil unions. Civil unions for opposite-sex couples only. Civil unions never performed.

== Current situation ==
=== National level ===
Status	Country	Legal since	Country population (Last count, 2015 est.)
Marriage (11 countries)	Argentina	2010	43,590,400
Marriage (11 countries)	Brazil	2013	205,574,000
Marriage (11 countries)	Canada	2005	35,819,000
Marriage (11 countries)	Chile	2022	18,191,900
Marriage (11 countries)	Colombia	2016	48,509,200
Marriage (11 countries)	Costa Rica	2020	4,851,000
Marriage (11 countries)	Cuba	2022	11,252,000
Marriage (11 countries)	Ecuador	2019	16,278,844
Marriage (11 countries)	Mexico	2022	121,006,000
Marriage (11 countries)	United States	2015	321,234,000
Marriage (11 countries)	Uruguay	2013	3,480,222
Subtotal	—	—	829,786,566 (84.62% of the American population)
Other form of recognition	Bolivia (free unions officially recognised starting in 2020; nationwide since 2023)	2023	10,985,059
Subtotal	—	—	10,985,059 (1.12% of the American population)
Total - Countries with some form of recognition of same-sex unions	—	—	840,771,625 (85.74% of the American population)
No recognition (19 countries)	Homosexuality is legal		
No recognition (19 countries)	Antigua and Barbuda	—	89,000
No recognition (19 countries)	(The Bahamas) Bahamas	—	379,000
No recognition (19 countries)	Barbados	—	283,000
No recognition (19 countries)	Belize	—	369,000
No recognition (19 countries)	Dominica	—	71,000
No recognition (19 countries)	El Salvador	—	6,460,000
No recognition (19 countries)	Guatemala	—	16,176,000
No recognition (19 countries)	Haiti	—	10,994,000
No recognition (19 countries)	Nicaragua	—	6,514,000
No recognition (19 countries)	Panama	—	3,764,000
No recognition (19 countries)	Peru	—	31,488,700
No recognition (19 countries)	Saint Kitts and Nevis	—	46,000
No recognition (19 countries)	Saint Lucia	—	172,000
No recognition (19 countries)	Suriname	—	534,189
No recognition (19 countries)	Trinidad and Tobago	—	1,357,000
No recognition (19 countries)	Venezuela	—	31,648,930
No recognition (19 countries)	Homosexuality is illegal but legislation is not enforced		
No recognition (19 countries)	Grenada	—	104,000
No recognition (19 countries)	Guyana	—	746,900
No recognition (19 countries)	Saint Vincent and the Grenadines	—	110,000
No recognition (19 countries)	Subtotal	—	111,306,719 (11.35% of the American population)
Constitutional ban on marriage (4 countries) * Homosexuality is illegal	Dominican Republic	2010	9,980,000
Constitutional ban on marriage (4 countries) * Homosexuality is illegal	Honduras	2005	8,950,000
Constitutional ban on marriage (4 countries) * Homosexuality is illegal	Jamaica*	2011	2,729,000
Constitutional ban on marriage (4 countries) * Homosexuality is illegal	Paraguay	1992	6,854,536
Subtotal	—	—	28,513,536 (2.91% of the American population)
Total - Countries with no recognition of same-sex unions	—	—	139,820,255 (14.26% of the American population)

=== Sub-national level ===
Status	Country	Jurisdiction	Legal since
Marriage (60 jurisdictions)
Marriage (60 jurisdictions)	Denmark	Greenland	2016
Marriage (60 jurisdictions)	France	French Guiana; Guadeloupe; Martinique; Saint Barthélemy; (Collectivity of Saint Martin) Saint Martin; Saint Pierre and Miquelon	2013
Marriage (60 jurisdictions)	Netherlands	Bonaire; Sint Eustatius; (Saba (island)) Saba	2012
Marriage (60 jurisdictions)	Netherlands	Aruba; Curaçao	2024
Marriage (60 jurisdictions)	United Kingdom	South Georgia and the South Sandwich Islands; Falkland Islands	2014; 2017
Marriage (60 jurisdictions)	United States (Note: Note: While listed here under “subnational level,” US Tribes are considered Nations both in a legal sense and when it comes to preferred language. The United States Government recognizes US Tribal Nations as “Domestic Dependent Nations” under the law in a government-to government relationship. Tribal nations exercise sovereignty, though Congress has ultimate authority under the Plenary Power Doctrine which is why tribal nations are placed here under an imperfect multi-purpose umbrella term)	Puerto Rico; (United States Virgin Islands) U.S. Virgin Islands	2015
Marriage (60 jurisdictions)	United States	Ak-Chin Indian Community (2017); Bay Mills Indian Community (2019); Blackfeet Nation (2014); Blue Lake Rancheria (2013); Central Council of the Tlingit and Haida Indian Tribes of Alaska (2015); Cherokee Nation (2016); Cheyenne and Arapaho Tribes (2013); Chickasaw Nation (2022); Choctaw Nation (2023); Colorado River Indian Tribes (2019); Confederated Tribes of Coos, Lower Umpqua and Siuslaw Indians (2014); Confederated Tribes of Siletz Indians (2015); Confederated Tribes of the Colville Reservation (2013); Confederated Tribes of the Grand Ronde Community of Oregon (2015); Coquille Indian Tribe (2009); Eastern Shoshone Tribe (2014); Fond du Lac Band of Lake Superior Chippewa (2014); Fort McDermitt Paiute and Shoshone Tribes (2014); Fort McDowell Yavapai Nation (2014); Grand Portage Band of Chippewa (2013); Grand Traverse Band of Ottawa and Chippewa Indians (2022); Hannahville Indian Community (2015); Ho-Chunk Nation of Wisconsin (2017); Iipay Nation of Santa Ysabel (2013); Keweenaw Bay Indian Community (2014); Lac du Flambeau Band of Lake Superior Chippewa (2014); Leech Lake Band of Ojibwe (2013); Little Traverse Bay Bands of Odawa Indians (2013); Lummi Nation (2022); Mashantucket Pequot Tribal Nation (2010); Menominee Indian Tribe of Wisconsin (2016); Northern Arapaho Tribe (2014); Oglala Sioux Tribe (2019); Oneida Tribe of Indians of Wisconsin (2015); Osage Nation (2017); Pascua Yaqui Tribe (2014); Pokagon Band of Potawatomi Indians (2013); Ponca Tribe of Nebraska (2018); Port Gamble S’Klallam Tribe (2012); Prairie Island Indian Community (2017); Puyallup Tribe of Indians (2014); Salt River Pima-Maricopa Indian Community (2014); San Carlos Apache Tribe (2014); Sault Ste. Marie Tribe of Chippewa Indians (2015); Stockbridge-Munsee Community Band of Mohican Indians (2016); Suquamish Tribe (2011); Tulalip Tribes of Washington (2016); Turtle Mountain Band of Chippewa Indians of North Dakota (2020); White Mountain Apache Tribe (2015); Winnebago Tribe of Nebraska (2022); Yavapai-Apache Nation (2014)	Varies
Other type of partnership (2 jurisdictions)	United Kingdom	Bermuda; Cayman Islands	2018; 2020
Marriage recognized, but not performed (2 jurisdictions)	Netherlands	Sint Maarten (Dutch Kingdom and EU countries only)	2007
Marriage recognized, but not performed (2 jurisdictions)	United Kingdom	Turks and Caicos Islands (immigration purposes only)	2025
No recognition (3 jurisdictions)	United Kingdom	Anguilla; British Virgin Islands; Montserrat	—

== 2018 Inter-American Court of Human Rights advisory opinion ==
On 9 January 2018, the Inter-American Court of Human Rights issued an advisory opinion that states party to the American Convention on Human Rights should grant same-sex couples accession to all existing domestic legal systems of family registration, including marriage, along with all rights that derive from marriage. The opinion was issued after the Government of Costa Rica sought clarification of its obligations to LGBT people under the convention. The opinion sets precedent for all 23 member states, 19 of which did not recognize same-sex marriage at the time of the ruling: Barbados, Bolivia, Chile, Costa Rica, Dominica, the Dominican Republic, Ecuador, El Salvador, Guatemala, Grenada, Haiti, Honduras, Jamaica, Mexico, Nicaragua, Panama, Paraguay, Peru, and Suriname. Of these, all but Dominica, Grenada and Jamaica recognize the jurisdiction of the Court. The Supreme Courts of Honduras, Panama, Peru and Suriname have rejected the IACHR advisory opinion, while the Supreme Courts of Costa Rica and Ecuador adhered to it.

== Future legislation ==
=== Civil unions ===
==== Opposition proposals or proposals without a parliamentary majority ====
Peru: On 20 November 2024, the Justice and Human Rights Commission of the Peruvian parliament approved a proposal aimed at legalizing same-sex civil unions in the country.

== Public opinion ==
Indicates the country/territory has legalized same-sex marriage nationwide
Indicates that same-sex marriage is legal in certain parts of the country
Indicates that the country has civil unions or registered partnerships
Indicates that same-sex sexual activity is illegal

Opinion polls for same-sex marriage by country
Country	Pollster	Year	For	Against	Neutral (Note: Also comprises: Don't know; No answer; Other; Refused.)	Margin of error	Source
Antigua and Barbuda	AmericasBarometer	2017	12%	-	-		
Argentina	Ipsos	2023	70%	16% [8% support some rights]	14% not sure	±3.5%	
Aruba		2021	46%				
(The Bahamas) Bahamas	AmericasBarometer	2014	11%	-	-		
Belize	AmericasBarometer	2014	8%	-	-		
Bolivia	AmericasBarometer	2017	35%	-	-		
Brazil	Ipsos	2023	51%	29% [15% support some rights]	20% not sure	±3.5% (Note: [+ more urban/educated than representative])	
Canada	Ipsos	2023	69%	17% [7% support some rights]	15% not sure	±3.5%	
Chile	Ipsos	2023	65%	24% [18% support some rights]	12%	±3.5%	
Colombia	Ipsos	2023	49%	33% [21% support some rights]	18%		
Costa Rica	CIEP	2018	35%	64%	1%		
Cuba	Gallup	2019	63.1%	36.9%			
Dominica	AmericasBarometer	2017	10%	-	-		
Dominican Republic	CDN 37	2018	45%	55%	-		
Ecuador	AmericasBarometer	2019	22.9%	51.3%	25.8%		
El Salvador	Universidad Francisco Gavidia	2021		82.5%			
Grenada	AmericasBarometer	2017	12%	-	-		
Guatemala	AmericasBarometer	2017	23%	-	-		
Guyana	AmericasBarometer	2017	21%	-	-		
Haiti	AmericasBarometer	2017	5%	-	-		
Honduras	CID Gallup	2018	17%	75%	8%		
Jamaica	AmericasBarometer	2017	16%	-	-		
Mexico	Ipsos	2023	58%	28% [17% support some rights]	14% not sure	±4.8%	
Nicaragua	AmericasBarometer	2017	25%	-	-		
Panama	AmericasBarometer	2017	22%	-	-		
Paraguay	AmericasBarometer	2017	26%	-	-		
Peru	Ipsos	2023	41%	40% [24% support some rights]	19%	±3.5%	
Saint Kitts and Nevis	AmericasBarometer	2017	9%	-	-		
Saint Lucia	AmericasBarometer	2017	11%	-	-		
Saint Vincent and the Grenadines	AmericasBarometer	2017	4%	-	-		
Suriname	AmericasBarometer	2014	18%	-	-		
Trinidad and Tobago	AmericasBarometer	2014	16%	-	-		
United States	Marquette	2022	72%	28%	–		
United States	Selzer	2022	74% (83%)	13% (17%)	13% not sure		
United States	Quinnipiac	2022	68% (77%)	22% (23%)	10%		
United States	Ipsos	2023	54%	31% [14% support some rights]	15% not sure	±3.5%	
Uruguay	Equipos Consultores	2019	59%	28%	13%		
Venezuela	Equilibrium Cende	2023	55% (63%)	32% (37%)	13%		

== See also ==
- LGBT rights in the Americas
- Recognition of same-sex unions in Africa
- Recognition of same-sex unions in Asia
- Recognition of same-sex unions in Europe
- Recognition of same-sex unions in Oceania
- Same-sex marriage in tribal nations in the United States
