= Rainbow Alliance (disambiguation) =

Rainbow Alliance may refer to:

- Make Politicians History, a United Kingdom political party
- Rainbow Alliance of the Bahamas, LGBT advocacy group
- Rainbow Alliance (Liberia), a political alliance in Liberia
- Rainbow Alliance (Togo), a political alliance in Togo
- South African Rainbow Alliance, a political party in South Africa
