= Recognition of same-sex unions in Suriname =

Suriname does not recognize same-sex marriages or civil unions. In February 2025, a court ordered the government to register the marriages of two same-sex couples and instructed it to modify laws regarding marriage to comply with international treaties.

== Civil unions ==
Suriname does not recognize civil unions which would offer same-sex couples some of the rights and benefits of marriage. Unlike the Netherlands, it also does not offer any legal protection to couples living in unregistered cohabitation (Dutch: samenwonen, pronounced [ˈsaːmə(ɱ)ˌʋoːnə(n)]; Sranan Tongo: seti libi, pronounced [ˈseti ˈlibi]). As a result, same-sex couples do not have access to the legal rights, benefits and obligations of marriage, including protection from domestic violence, adoption rights, tax benefits and inheritance rights.

== Same-sex marriage ==
=== Background ===
The Constitution of Suriname does not explicitly ban same-sex marriage or address the institution of marriage. Article 15 of the Constitution guarantees the right to found a family:

The family is recognized and protected.

However, article 80 of the Civil Code states: "By marriage, a man can only be married to one woman, and a woman can only be married to one man." (Note: Dutch: De man kan tegelijkertijd slechts met en vrouw, de vrouw slechts met en man door het huwelijk verbonden zijn.) In a 2014 report issued to the United Nations Human Rights Committee, four LGBT advocacy groups wrote, "Family laws in Suriname define marriage as the union between a man and a woman. LGBTI persons are not allowed to marry persons of the same sex. Considering that same-sex marriage is illegal, same-sex couples cannot be granted other rights which would result from such a legal union. Among other things, they therefore cannot inherit property or goods from a deceased partner as married opposite-sex couples can. In the recent Pension Act [Wet Algemeen Pensioen 2014], married and unmarried opposite-sex couples are entitled to the pension of their deceased partner. Even though the Pension Act does not explicitly exclude same-sex partners of the same rights as opposite-sex partners, the Government has publicly stated in Parliament that the Pension Act would not include same-sex partnerships." In July 2024, Ebu Jones, an MP from the National Democratic Party, said that "Suriname society must sooner or later address" the issue of same-sex marriage. Interim Minister of Justice David Abiamofo stated in the National Assembly the same month that same-sex marriages are not allowed under Surinamese law.

=== Court cases ===
Recognition of same-sex unions in South America Marriage Other type of partnership Unrecognized Constitution limits marriage to opposite-sex couples Same-sex sexual activity illegal, though penalties not enforced

On 9 January 2018, the Inter-American Court of Human Rights (IACHR) issued an advisory opinion that parties to the American Convention on Human Rights should grant same-sex couples "accession to all existing domestic legal systems of family registration, including marriage, along with all rights that derive from marriage". The opinion states that:

The State must recognize and guarantee all rights derived from a family bond between persons of the same sex in accordance with the provisions of Articles 11.2 and 17.1 of the American Convention. (...) in accordance with articles 1.1, 2, 11.2, 17, and 24 of the American Convention, it is necessary to guarantee access to all the existing figures in domestic legal systems, including the right to marry. (..) To ensure the protection of all the rights of families formed by same-sex couples, without discrimination with respect to those that are constituted by heterosexual couples.

Suriname ratified the American Convention on Human Rights on 12 November 1987 and also recognized the court's jurisdiction that same day. LGBT activists responded to the advisory opinion by calling on the government to legalize same-sex marriage, though said they believed that the "country [was] not ready for LGBT rights".

On 31 January 2023, the Constitutional Court ruled that the ban on same-sex marriage did not violate the Constitution or Suriname's obligations under the American Convention on Human Rights. However, the court also found that the Civil Code was outdated and needed to be modernized following public debate. This lawsuit was filed by two same-sex couples who had married abroad and sought recognition of their marriages in Suriname. One of the couples, who remained anonymous, had married in Argentina in 2018 after nearly 35 years together, but the Central Bureau for Civil Affairs (Centraal Bureau voor Burgerzaken) had refused to recognize their Argentine marriage license. Following the decision, the couple said it was "very remarkable and strange that the Constitutional Court [has] ignore[d] the judgment of the American Court of Human Rights". Likewise, local human rights activist Carla Bakboord said "it is incomprehensible that the Constitutional Court [has] come to such a ruling. When the Court is abundantly clear about discrimination and the subordination of Surinamese legislation to that of international treaties, you do indeed expect the review to turn out to be different from this. I am very surprised."

On 13 February 2025, Judge Shanti Bikhari ruled that the government had to register the marriages of the two same-sex couples with the Central Bureau for Civil Affairs within seven days. The court held that the government's refusal to register the marriages conflicted with international treaties to which Suriname is a party and ordered it to begin amending legislation accordingly. Although the government could appeal the ruling, the judgment was immediately enforceable and had to be implemented within seven days. For each day the deadline was exceeded, a penalty of SR$10,000 would be payable to the couples, up to a maximum of SR$1 million. Activist Juan Pigot called the ruling "a nice, beautiful victory" and called on the Parliament to "incorporate this court ruling into the new Civil Code"; "Now that we have a court decision, and with elections coming up, we hope that political parties supporting the LGBTQI+ community will see this ruling as a standard. This is the time to bring it to the attention of the National Assembly. They now have the opportunity to correct their major mistake."

=== Native Surinamese ===
While many Indigenous cultures historically practiced polygamy, there are no records of same-sex marriages being performed in these cultures in the way they are commonly defined in Western legal systems. However, many Indigenous communities recognize identities and relationships that may be placed on the LGBTQ spectrum. Among these are two-spirit individuals—people who embody both masculine and feminine qualities. In some cultures, two-spirit individuals assigned male at birth wear women's clothing and engage in household and artistic work associated with the feminine sphere. Historically, this identity sometimes allowed for unions between two people of the same biological sex. Although there is little literature on this two-spirit structure, it is believed that the Lokono traditionally recognized two-spirit individuals, known as bian üya. Social attitudes towards homosexuality and same-sex marriages are unknown among the Wayana.

=== Religious performance ===
The Catholic Church, the largest Christian denomination in Suriname, opposes same-sex marriage and does not allow its priests to officiate at such marriages. In December 2023, the Holy See published Fiducia supplicans, a declaration allowing Catholic priests to bless couples who are not considered to be married according to church teaching, including the blessing of same-sex couples. Donald Chambers, the General Secretary of the Antilles Episcopal Conference, said in response that: "The spontaneous blessings are simply gestures that provide an effective means of increasing trust in God on the part of the person who asks. Hence the title, Fiducia supplicans literally means asking for trust." Pentecostal groups are vocally opposed to same-sex unions.

Hinduism is not opposed to sexual diversity, though Hindu leaders in Suriname have been relatively silent on the issue. Media outlets have reported that many Indo-Surinamese are forced into arranged marriages with partners of the opposite sex.

== Public opinion ==
A 2010 opinion poll carried out by Vanderbilt University showed that 10.3% of Surinamese people supported same-sex marriage. The 2023 AmericasBarometer showed that support had increased to 20%.

== See also ==
- LGBT rights in Suriname
- Recognition of same-sex unions in the Americas
