= Recognition of same-sex unions in Nicaragua =

Status of same-sex union

Nicaragua does not recognise same-sex marriages or civil unions. The Constitution of Nicaragua forbids same-sex marriage and limits de facto unions to opposite-sex couples.

== Civil unions ==
Nicaragua recognises de facto unions (Spanish: unión de hecho estable) for cohabiting opposite-sex couples. Article 83 of the Family Code defines de facto unions as "a voluntary agreement between a man and a woman". Couples in these unions are offered the same rights as married couples, but are required to have lived together for at least two years in a "stable and notorious manner" before registering. Ramón Rodríguez, a professor of criminal law and human rights at the Central American University, told El Comercio in 2015 that the provisions "establishing marriage and stable de facto unions as between a man and a woman only constitute a violation of the universal principle of equality and non-discrimination".

== Same-sex marriage ==
=== Background ===
Article 72 of the Constitution of Nicaragua states that:

Marriage and stable unions are protected by the State; they rest on the voluntary agreement between a man and a woman, and may be dissolved by mutual consent or by the shall of one of the parties. The law shall regulate this matter. (Note: In some languages of Nicaragua: Spanish: El matrimonio y la unión de hecho estable están protegidos por el Estado; descansan en el acuerdo voluntario del hombre y la mujer y podrán disolverse por el mutuo consentimiento o por la voluntad de una de las partes. La ley regulará esta materia.; Miskito: Upla Marit taki wal bri ba ban kasak kaina sunanka brisa kuntri bui; baha ba bara sa waitna bara mairin wal wilin bara sipsa wal dakbi sakaia wal aikupia laka kaka apia kaka maya kum baman luki sa kaka.; Mayangna: Marit lani dawak muih yalni kapat duwi yalahwa kidika Gabamint parasni yaklauwi tanitdakwa ki; kidika laih, al dawak yal karak yulbauwi wilin kalahwi kulnin aslah barangni kalalahna ki, dawak sip karak dakwi kalahnin witinna kulninna lani kat, awaskat as yaklauwi kapat yulwarang kat. La yaklauwi adika dini laihwi yamna karang.)

In 2012, responding to a request from human rights groups to discuss the legalisation of same-sex marriage, a deputy from the Sandinista National Liberation Front said "they had to wait another 30 years for that to happen". In June 2014, the National Assembly approved a revised family code limiting marriage, de facto unions and adoption to heterosexual couples. The new code went into effect on 8 April 2015. Article 53 of the Family Code describes marriages as "a voluntary union between a man and a woman".

=== 2018 Inter-American Court of Human Rights advisory opinion ===
Homosexuality laws in Central America and the Caribbean Islands. Same-sex marriage Other type of partnership Unregistered cohabitation No recognition of same-sex couples Constitution limits marriage to opposite-sex couples Same-sex sexual activity illegal but law not enforced

On 9 January 2018, the Inter-American Court of Human Rights (IACHR) issued an advisory opinion that parties to the American Convention on Human Rights should grant same-sex couples "accession to all existing domestic legal systems of family registration, including marriage, along with all rights that derive from marriage". The ruling states that:

The State must recognize and guarantee all rights derived from a family bond between persons of the same sex in accordance with the provisions of Articles 11.2 and 17.1 of the American Convention. (...) in accordance with articles 1.1, 2, 11.2, 17, and 24 of the American Convention, it is necessary to guarantee access to all the existing figures in domestic legal systems, including the right to marry. (..) To ensure the protection of all the rights of families formed by same-sex couples, without discrimination with respect to those that are constituted by heterosexual couples.

Nicaragua ratified the American Convention on Human Rights on 25 September 1979 and recognized the court's jurisdiction on 12 February 1991. LGBT groups applauded the decision. The Mexican newspaper Milenio reported that the advisory opinion came as a "shock" to LGBT activists. Ludwika Lega Espinoza, head of the Nicaraguan Trans Association (Asociación Nicaragüense de Transgeneras), said she was "happy" with the decision, but that "in the case of Nicaragua we are focused on priority issues such as improving the Health Law, to end discrimination, full access to education, and recognition of gender identity."

== Religious performance ==
The Catholic Church opposes same-sex marriage and does not allow its priests to officiate at such marriages. In 2010, the Archbishop of Managua, Leopoldo Brenes, reiterated his opposition to "the various projects together or alone that pretend to grant unions between members of the same sex with heterosexual marriage". He added, "The church makes a distinction between the respect for every person regardless of sexual orientation, but rejects homosexual and lesbian practices as an act objectively contrary to God's plan for the human race." The government had not announced any plans to recognize same-sex unions, but had recently created a special prosecuting unit to combat violence against LGBT people. In December 2023, the Holy See published Fiducia supplicans, a declaration allowing Catholic priests to bless couples who are not considered to be married according to church teaching, including the blessing of same-sex couples. Various Protestant groups are also firmly opposed to same-sex marriage.

== Public opinion ==
According to a Pew Research Center survey conducted between 9 November and 13 December 2013, 77% of Nicaraguans opposed same-sex marriage, 16% were in favor and 7% were undecided. The 2017 AmericasBarometer showed that 24.5% of Nicaraguans supported same-sex marriage. A survey published by the Nicaraguan Foundation for Economic and Social Development (Fundación Nicaragüense para el Desarrollo Económico y Social) in January 2021 showed that support had increased to 29%.

== See also ==
- LGBT rights in Nicaragua
- Recognition of same-sex unions in the Americas
