= Alexus D'Marco =

Bahamian LGBTQ rights activist

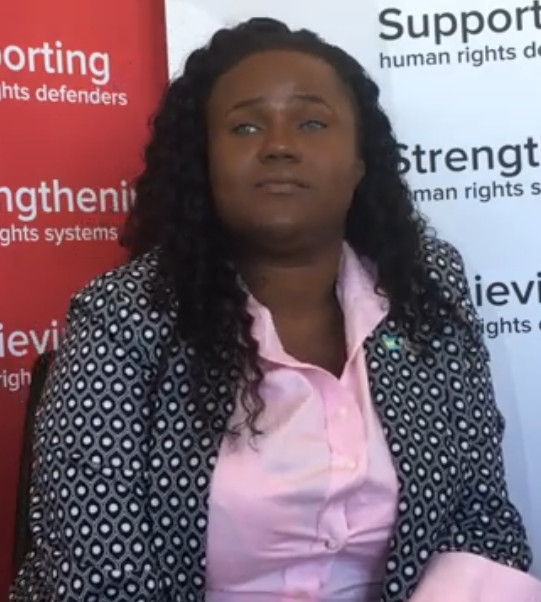
- In an ISHR video in 2019
- Born: The Bahamas
- Education: University of the West Indies
- Occupation: Human rights activist
- Years active: 2003–present
- Organization: United Caribbean Trans Network

Alexus D'Marco is a Bahamian human rights activist. She is known for her advocacy for LGBTQ people, both in the Bahamas and in the Caribbean region.

== Early life and education ==
D'Marco was born and raised in the Bahamas. She identified as a girl from a young age, for which she went through psychiatric evaluation and counselling, including at the Sandilands Rehabilitation Centre and St. Luke's Medical Centre in Nassau. Once D'Marco reached adulthood, she travelled to the United States, where she received gender-affirming care before returning to the Bahamas.

D'Marco graduated with a degree in gender studies from the University of the West Indies.

== Activism ==
By 2003, D'Marco was the mother of the House of DMARCO (Dreams Manifested Around Restoration, Change and Opportunity), providing care for young Bahamian members of the LGBTQ community who had been shunned by their biological or adopted families. In 2015, she established the DMARCO Organisation, a civil society organisation that advocated for LGBTQ people in the Bahamas and sought to elevate their visibility and acceptance within Bahamian society, in addition to linking LGBTQ people with the services they needed. Through her role with DMARCO, D'Marco noticed the high numbers of people with HIV/AIDS who did not seek medical treatment due to the social stigma against the disease, and worked with medical professionals to help them better understand and support LGBTQ patients. She has also raised awareness of services for people with HIV and AIDS in the Bahamas.

D'Marco was also the co-founder and executive director of the United Caribbean Trans Network, a network for transgender people living in the Caribbean region. It advocated for the rights, protection and healthcare of transgender people, in addition to offering support and guidance to localised movements in the area. D'Marco is also the Caribbean coordinator for Redlactrans, a transgender rights organisation; Pride Bahamas; and a member of the board of Global Black Pride.

D'Marco has called for Caribbean states to legally recognise and offer protections to LGBTQ people, as well as intersex people, due to "systemic ignorance and prejudice" against them, including from statutory services such as hospitals and the police. She has called on the Bahamian government to guarantee access to justice, education, healthcare, employment and housing in law for LGBTQ children and adults, stating that the Bahamian constitution's provisions for freedom of expression and respect for fundamental human rights should be extended in practice to the LGBTQ community. D'Marco publicly praised the Ministry of Social Services' diversity programme, which aimed to prevent LGBTQ children from being detained at juvenile detention centres on grounds of being "uncontrollable" due to their sexual identity or gender. She attended the 47th General Assembly of the Organisation of American States alongside Darren Henfield, the Minister of Foreign Affairs, to talk about civil society.

In 2023, D'Marco contributed to a pre-session of the Universal Periodic Review of the United Nations Human Rights Council in Geneva, addressing the issues of climate change and LGBTQ rights in the Bahamas.

In 2026, following the separate murders of two men in Nassau, D'Marco called for hate crime legislation to be passed by the Bahamian government. The Attorney General, Wayne Munroe, rejected D'Marco's call, stating he had received "no information" that either men's deaths were attributable to their sexualities.
