= Recognition of same-sex unions in Paraguay =

Paraguay does not recognize same-sex marriage or civil unions. The Constitution of Paraguay has explicitly prohibited same-sex marriage since 1992, and de facto unions are only available to opposite-sex couples. Support for same-sex marriage remains low in comparison to neighboring Argentina and Brazil.

== Civil unions and limited rights ==
Paraguay does not recognize civil unions (Spanish: unión de hecho; pronounced [uˈnjon de ˈetʃo]; Guarani: jeiko oñondive, pronounced [ᵈjeiˈko oɲoⁿdiˈʋe]). The Constitution of Paraguay recognizes de facto unions with similar legal rights to marriage, but only for opposite-sex couples. Article 51(2) of the Constitution states:

A de facto union between a man and a woman, having no legal impediments to getting married and being characterized by stability and monogamy, produces a similar effect to that of a legal marriage, in accordance with the provisions established by law.

In August 2011, Itaipu Binacional, the company operating the Itaipu Dam, began recognizing the same-sex partners of employees for the purpose of private health insurance benefits, provided the couples had been living together for at least six months. A company official stated that the measure aimed solely to include same-sex partners as eligible beneficiaries under the employee health insurance plan.

== Same-sex marriage ==
Recognition of same-sex unions in South America Marriage Other type of partnership Unrecognized Constitution limits marriage to opposite-sex couples Same-sex sexual activity illegal, though penalties not enforced

=== Background ===
Article 140 of the Civil Code expressly prohibits marriage between persons of the same sex. Likewise, Article 52 of the Constitution of Paraguay states that "The union in marriage by a man and woman is one of the fundamental factors in the formation of a family". (Note: In the official languages of Paraguay: Spanish: La unión en matrimonio del hombre y la mujer es uno de los componentes fundamentales en la formación de la familia.; Guarani: Kuimba'e ha kuña joaju, menda rupigua, ha'e ñemoñanga yta tee peteĩva ha tenondetegua.) The Constitution has limited marriage to "a man and a woman" since 1992. Article 51(1) further states that "the law will establish the formalities to be observed for the marriage between a man and a woman, the requirements for contracting it, and the causes for separation or dissolution and its effects, as well as property management provisions and other rights and obligations between spouses". (Note: In the official languages of Paraguay: Spanish: La ley establecerá las formalidades para la celebración del matrimonio entre el hombre y la mujer, los requisitos para contraerlo, las causas de separación, de disolución y sus efectos, así como el régimen de administración de bienes y otros derechos y obligaciones entre cónyuges.; Guarani: Léipe oĩva'erã mba'éichapa ojejapóta omenda hag̃ua kuimba'e kuña ndive, mba'épa oñekotevẽta upevarã, mba'éichapa ikatu ojueja jey hikuái, ha oparei jeýrõpa mba'e hapykuere; oĩva'erã avei léipe mba'éichapa ojeporúta mba'e oguerekóva hikuái; he'íva'erã avei mba'e mba'épa hembiaporã katu ha hembiaporã tee mokõivéva.)

In September 2023, a same-sex couple, Beto Leiva and Felipe Rojas, held a symbolic marriage ceremony at the Alta Gracia Parque Hotel in Caacupé. The marriage lacks legal recognition, and the ceremony was labelled as "outrageous" on the front pages of national newspapers.

=== Developments in 2010–present ===
Following the legalisation of same-sex marriage in Argentina in July 2010, the non-profit organization SOMOSGAY announced its intention to advocate for a same-sex marriage bill in the Congress of Paraguay. In May 2017, Santiago Peña, a presidential candidate for the ruling Colorado Party, announced his support for same-sex marriage. His stance was criticised by President Horacio Cartes, who in 2013 was quoted as saying that he would "shoot a bullet into his testicles were his son to express interest in marrying another man." In March 2019, the Senate of Paraguay approved a draft declaration identifying itself as "pro-life and pro-family", expressing opposition to same-sex marriage and abortion. The move was criticised by many lawmakers, who argued that the state is secular and cannot impose moral principles or values linked to religion. While running for president in the April 2023 election, Peña expressed opposition to same-sex marriage, as did his main opponent, Efraín Alegre.

In 2013, Simón Cazal and Sergio López, Paraguayan nationals who had legally married in Argentina in March 2012, attempted to register their marriage in Paraguay. After their request was denied, they filed a legal challenge seeking recognition of their marriage. However, the lawsuit was dismissed on 4 April 2013, with the judge ruling that the Paraguayan Constitution does not recognize same-sex marriages. Media outlets have reported on other couples who married abroad—in Argentina, Costa Rica or Spain—being denied recognition in Paraguay, including the inability of a foreign partner to obtain a residence permit.

=== Court cases ===
On 9 January 2018, the Inter-American Court of Human Rights (IACHR) issued an advisory opinion that parties to the American Convention on Human Rights should grant same-sex couples "accession to all existing domestic legal systems of family registration, including marriage, along with all rights that derive from marriage". The advisory opinion states that:

The State must recognize and guarantee all rights derived from a family bond between persons of the same sex in accordance with the provisions of Articles 11.2 and 17.1 of the American Convention. (...) in accordance with articles 1.1, 2, 11.2, 17, and 24 of the American Convention, it is necessary to guarantee access to all the existing figures in domestic legal systems, including the right to marry. (..) To ensure the protection of all the rights of families formed by same-sex couples, without discrimination with respect to those that are constituted by heterosexual couples.

Paraguay ratified the Convention on 24 August 1989 and recognized the court's jurisdiction on 11 March 1993. On 12 January 2018, SOMOSGAY announced its intention to file a petition with the Supreme Court of Justice to legalize same-sex marriage in Paraguay. Government officials reacted negatively to the IACHR opinion, with some opponents also falsely claiming that it did not apply to Paraguay. Mario Abdo Benítez said in March 2018 that he would veto any same-sex marriage bill passed by Congress if elected president in the April 2018 election, which he subsequently won.

=== Religious performance ===
The Catholic Church, the largest Christian denomination in Paraguay, opposes same-sex marriage and does not allow its priests to officiate at such marriages. During Secretary-General Ban Ki-moon's official visit to Paraguay in February 2015, the Archbishop of Asunción, Edmundo Valenzuela, called on the United Nations to stop "pushing" the legalization of same-sex marriage in Paraguay; "Unfortunately, various recommendations from the U.N. on human rights for Paraguay and other countries include supposedly new rights such as those proclaimed by radical groups that are dedicated to promoting the legalization of abortion, euthanasia, homosexual and other kinds of unions, with the possibility that these couples can adopt children." Later that same year, Pope Francis met with Simón Cazal, a married gay man, during a visit to Paraguay. In January 2020, Archbishop Valenzuela called for all families to be "welcomed in the [C]hurch and accompanied to live virtuously": "Today we find that there are gay couples who form their families; we cannot ignore that reality. We are accompanying these people to be able to give them mercy and understanding. It is true that it is a morally irregular situation, but we do not gain anything by denigrating or accusing." In December 2023, the Holy See published Fiducia supplicans, a declaration allowing Catholic priests to bless couples who are not considered to be married according to church teaching, including the blessing of same-sex couples.

== Public opinion ==
According to a Pew Research Center survey conducted between 26 November 2013 and 8 January 2014, 15% of Paraguayans supported same-sex marriage, while 81% were opposed. The 2017 AmericasBarometer found that 26% of Paraguayans supported same-sex marriage. The 2023 Latinobarómetro estimated that support for same-sex marriage stood at 15%, while 83% were opposed and 2% were undecided or had refused to answer. According to the 2023 AmericasBarometer, support had increased to 17%.

== See also ==
- LGBTQ rights in Paraguay
- Recognition of same-sex unions in the Americas
