= Erin Greene =

Bahamian human rights advocate

- Known for: LGBT+ advocacy

Erin Greene is a Bahamian human rights advocate. She is considered a leading advocate for LGBT rights in the Bahamas, having been described as "arguably the country’s most outspoken LGBT activist."

== Early and personal life ==
As a teenager, Greene worked as a councilor at a Methodist Youth Summer Camp, at bible schools, and in the Police Force Summer Youth Program. After attending Queen's College in the early 1990s, she began identifying as gay in her twenties, which coincided with her increasing political engagement.

== Career and advocacy ==
Greene is a longtime advocate for human rights, including for women, immigrants, and the incarcerated, but particularly for LGBT Bahamians. LGBT rights in the Bahamas are extremely limited: There are no laws that address discrimination or harassment due to sexual orientation or gender identity, nor does the country recognize same-sex unions in any form, whether it be marriage or partnerships.

She began her work as an activist in earnest in the late 1990s and early 2000s, helping organize the first Pride event in the country in 2001. In 2000, she joined the Caribbean Association for Feminist Research and Action (CAFRA), becoming its Bahamas representative in 2002 and eventually becoming regional chairperson. When the Rainbow Alliance of the Bahamas coalesced in 2003, Greene became the organization's spokesperson, eventually serving as the group's president before it shut down in 2008.

Greene joined the Caribbean Forum for Liberation and Acceptance of Genders and Sexualities (CARIFLAG) and the Bahamas Human Rights Network in 2007, and she has also been involved in the Bahamian-Haitian Solidarity Group for immigration rights. She later served as director of advocacy at the Society Against STIs and HIV (SASH) Bahamas in 2013–2014.

Greene has faced significant backlash to her activism, including a series of death threats and stalking incidents. In 2019, she was the subject of violent threats and harassment on social media after she called for the Jamaican musical artist Buju Banton to refrain from performing his controversial song "Boom Bye Bye," which has been interpreted as supporting the murder of gay men, during a regional concert tour.

In 2014, she was nominated for a Community Titan Award as part of Bahamas Pride Freedom Weekend.

Greene has hosted the radio shows "The Culture of Things" and "On the Clock." She also works as a fish distributor and does stand-up comedy.
