= United Caribbean Trans Network =

Transgender network in the Caribbean

- Abbreviation: UCTRANS
- Formation: 2018; 8 years ago
- Legal status: Active
- Region served: Caribbean countries
- Executive Director: Alexus D'Marco
- Affiliations: GiveOut (UK); COC Nederland; Synergia; CVC; ECADE; OutRight Action International
- Website: uctrans.org

The United Caribbean Trans Network (UCTRANS) is the first regional transgender network in the Caribbean. It works with and on behalf of the transgender community across the region to advocate for their rights, protection, and healthcare. It also offers support and guidance to local movements.

UCTRANS and OutRight conducted a holistic study titled Over-Policed, Under Protected in 2020, published at the end of March 2021. It identified the issues faced by trans and gender diverse people in the Caribbean using feedback collected from surveys, focus groups and interviews in 11 countries.

== Origins and leadership ==
The United Caribbean Trans Network was formed in February 2018. It officially launched in April 2019 with support from LGBT+ organisations both in the Caribbean and abroad such as GiveOut, COC Nederland, and OutRight Action International.

From their website, UCTRANS envision a "Caribbean where Trans people are free from stigma and discrimination, can enjoy supportive Human Rights-based policy frameworks, Gender Identity recognition laws as well as progressive and efficient Transgender-focused healthcare." The network has a board of directors and a secretariat team.
