= Rainbow Alliance of the Bahamas =

The Rainbow Alliance of The Bahamas was a support and advocacy group for persons in the gay, lesbian, bisexual and transgender community.

== History ==
The group was established in May 1999 during a social event hosted by members of other LGBTQ groups. The members of those groups, BGLAD (Bahamian Gays and Lesbians Against Discrimination) and Hope TEA (Hope Through Education and Awareness), decided it would be better to pool their resources together and create one national gay rights organization. They named it “The Rainbow Alliance of The Bahamas.” Erin Greene was one of the organisers of the Alliance, becoming a spokesperson on behalf of the group.

At that time RAB was essentially a support group, organizing LGBT socials and the annual, low-key gay pride event in The Bahamas. However, in 2004 when Bishop Sam Greene threatened to blow up parliament if the government had followed Canada and legalized gay marriage in The Bahamas, group members felt the need to stand up against him and other forms of bigotry and discrimination in the country.

The activist arm of the group placed it in the public spotlight between 2004 and 2008. The group eventually disbanded in 2008 due to a lack of resources.

== Legal fight ==
There is no legislation in The Bahamas that addresses basic human rights concerns of LGBT (Lesbian, Gay, Bisexual, and Transgender) people. In fact, discrimination can be found in existing laws on same-sex relationships. One example is the law regarding the age of consent.

Homosexual relations between consenting adults have been legal in The Bahamas since May 1991, but the age of consent is two years higher than that for heterosexuals – 18 vs. 16. Adult heterosexual men can legally engage in sexual activity with 16-year-old girls, though these teens are considered minors. Homosexual men however, have been charged before the courts for having consensual sex with 16- and 17-year-old males.

LGBT Bahamians are also subject to discrimination in employment. The Employment Bill of 2001, which had a clause barring discrimination in the workplace based on sexual orientation, was passed with that clause removed. The law was amended again in 2002, still without protecting LGBT Bahamians.

In addition to protesting these laws, RAB spoke out strongly against its lack of inclusion in the former government's Constitutional Reform Commission. The commission, which included outspoken anti-gay Bishop Sam Greene, had been reviewing the country's unamended 1973 constitution between 2003 and 2006. It failed to consider a person's sexual orientation as an attribute deserving of protection from discrimination in a preliminary report it presented to the Cabinet on March 21, 2006.

== See also ==
- LGBT rights in the Bahamas
- List of LGBT rights organisations
