= LGBTQ rights in the Bahamas =

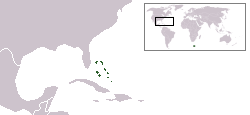
- The Bahamas
- Legal status: Legal since 1991, age of consent not equal
- Gender identity: Transgender people are not legally allowed to change gender
- Military: LGBT people are allowed to serve openly
- Discrimination protections: Limited protections based on sexual orientation (see below)

Family rights
- Recognition of relationships: No recognition of same-sex couples
- Adoption: Not allowed

Lesbian, gay, bisexual and transgender (LGBT) people in the Bahamas have limited legal protections. While same-sex sexual activity is legal in the Bahamas, there are no laws that address discrimination in broad terms or harassment on the account of sexual orientation or gender identity, nor does it recognize same sex unions in any form, whether it be marriage or partnerships. Households headed by same-sex couples are also not eligible for any of the same rights given to opposite-sex married couples.

== Legality of same-sex sexual activity ==
Homosexuality laws in Central America and the Caribbean Islands. Same-sex marriage Other type of partnership Unregistered cohabitation No recognition of same-sex couples Constitution limits marriage to opposite-sex couples Same-sex sexual activity illegal but law not enforced

Same-sex relationships between consenting adults became legal in the Bahamas in 1991. However, the criminal code still requires a higher age of consent for homosexual acts. The legal age of consent to engage in sexual activity is 16 for straight couples and 18 for same-sex couples.

== Recognition of same-sex relationships ==
Same-sex marriages and civil unions are not legal in the Bahamas. LGBT rights groups never challenged the country's marriage laws, and the "Bahamas Marriage Act" states that a Bahamian marriage is composed of a man and woman.

In July 2011, after the ratification of the Maritime Marriage Law, former Minister of State for Finance, Zhivargo Laing, said, "As a community in The Bahamas we believe that a marriage must and should be and is between a man and a woman. A marriage is void if it took place between persons who were male and male or female and female. So, in this Maritime Marriage Bill we are stating this fact in the clear positive – a marriage must take place between a male and a female and we want that to be abundantly clear that, that is so and that is keeping with our community standard".

In 2013, former Bahamian Chief Justice Michael L. Barnett stated: "I have no doubt that it is only a matter of time when the courts of The Bahamas will address the issue of same sex marriage. I also have no doubt that in deciding the issue we will have respect for the decisions that emanate not only from the Commonwealth countries like Canada and Australia, but also from decisions of the courts of the United States of America. But our references to the views of justices of the United States are not limited to referring to those decisions in our own judgments".

In 2013, former Prime Minister Perry Christie said the Bahamas would not consider same-sex marriage saying "It’s something I don’t believe in".

In 2016, campaigning for the 2016 Bahamian constitutional referendum the former Prime Minister Perry Christie reiterated his opposition to same-sex marriage saying: "I repeat: this referendum will not cause same-sex marriage to become legal in the Bahamas. Marriage in the Bahamas will be legal only if it is between a man and a woman, and male and female are determined at birth".

== Discrimination protections ==
Since 2003, Section 1 of the Data Protection (Privacy of Personal Information) Act includes “sexual life” among the protected sensitive personal data.

The Communications Act (2009) on "Content Regulation" states that The Utilities Regulation and Competition Authority (URCA) may by determination issue regulatory and other measures to regulate content services intended for reception by subscribers of carriage services or by broadcasting. URCA shall issue codes of practice which will be taken into account the matter that is likely to incite or perpetuate hatred against, or vilifies, any person or group on the basis of ethnicity, nationality, race, gender, sexual preference, age, religion or physical or mental disability.

On 17 June 2011, the Bahamian Government expressed support for the UN declaration on sexual orientation and gender identity. However, no government action has been taken to ensure that LGBT citizens are included in non-discrimination clauses in statute laws.

Discrimination in areas such as employment, education, housing, healthcare, banking, and public businesses on the basis of sexual orientation or gender identity is not illegal. Likewise, there are no national hate crime laws to prevent or punish violence directed toward people in the LGBT community.

In 2001, the government proposed an Employment Bill, which included a clause that banned workplace discrimination based on sexual orientation. The clause was removed shortly after the bill was passed.

=== Constitutional protections ===
The Bahamian Constitution provides various civil liberties, but its prohibition against discrimination does not include sexual orientation or gender identity. Efforts to include sexual orientation in a newly proposed Constitution have been blocked by members of a government-appointed commission which opposes homosexuality based on religious motivations.

On 21 March 2006, the Constitutional Reform Commission presented a preliminary report to a previous Progressive Liberal Party (PLP) government. The Commission indicated that citizens must be treated equally regardless of religion, political affiliation, race, sex and gender. However, despite recommendations, it did not regard sexual orientation as an attribute deserving protection from discrimination.

== Military service ==
There are no prohibitions on LGBT citizens serving in the Bahamian police or military forces. In May 1998, National Security Minister and Deputy Prime Minister Frank Watson declared that the Bahamian military, prison service, and police force did not discriminate based on sexual orientation.

== Social conditions ==
Many Bahamians adhere to socially conservative Christian denominations, which generally promote the belief that homosexuality and cross dressing are signs of decadence and immorality. Politicians have been leery of publicly supporting LGBT-rights legislation.

While there are no exclusively gay bars or clubs in the Bahamas, there is an underground gay scene in Nassau, as well as many gay-friendly resorts, cafes, and bars throughout various parts of the country.

The Bahamas has a tourist-based economy and the government targets a variety of markets, but not the growing LGBT tourism market. Individual and small groups of homosexual tourists typically face no issues, but groups of LGBT visitors have been protested on various occasions. However, the Rainbow Alliance of The Bahamas held a counter-protest during the 2004 demonstrations, welcoming the LGBT visitors.

Today the Bahamas is noted as becoming increasingly gay-friendly. However, locals warn that homophobia is still a prominent social issue and recommend that tourists exercise discretion.

In December 2018, the Canadian Government has issued new travel advice warning gay couples about the risk of homophobia in The Bahamas. Bahamian LGBT activist Erin Greene told the Bahamas Tribune newspaper: "I think it is a sound, a reasonable advisory to LGBTQ Canadians. Alexus D’Marco told the newspaper: "We should acknowledge that LGBT people do exist in The Bahamas that they have been stigmatised and discriminated against". However, in February 2019, it was reported that more than half of the 5,400 men on board the exclusively gay "Allure Caribbean Cruise that disembarked" in Nassau with many of them saying that they felt "safe" and "comfortable" which activist Alexus D’Marco says is a good indication the capital is viewed as "safe" for the LGBT community.

There have even been several high-profile situations of discrimination directed at LGBT citizens as well as tourists in the Bahamas:

- In July 2004, church groups protested the arrival of Rosie O'Donnell's R Family Vacations cruise.
- In September 2005, an 18-year-old beauty queen had her crown stripped after confirming rumours that she was a lesbian.
- In March 2006, the Bahamas Plays and Films Control Board banned the American gay-themed movie, Brokeback Mountain.
- In September 2007, the Bahamas Christian Council formed an anti-gay committee to fight against a gay group after it asked the local cable company to offer Logo, a channel catering to the LGBTQ community.
- On 6 October 2007, police raided a gay party in downtown Nassau but could not arrest anyone, as no crime was committed. Guests of the party demanded an apology from local police. The Bahamas Ministry of Tourism issued an apology to the cruise company. This incident mirrors a public protest to a lesbian cruise which docked in Nassau on 14 April 1998.
- In a 2009 case, a jury acquitted a man charged with murdering a homosexual, HIV-positive male. The man used the so-called "gay panic defence", claiming that the gay male attempted to rape him. However, the prosecution denied this and said the gay man – who was a shop owner and son of a politician – was robbed before he was killed. The prosecution also questioned why the man went to the gay man's apartment around 11 pm, charging that it was with the intent to commit a robbery. But the defence attorney said his client was "protecting his manhood" and the killing of the gay man was justified. The story sparked international outrage.
- On 10 June 2010, in a similar gay panic defense case, a convicted killer received a very lenient sentence in the shooting death of a gay man. The convict claimed the gay man had made a "homosexual advance" towards him. Joan Sawyer, the President of the Court of Appeal, was quoted as saying, "One is entitled to use whatever force is necessary to prevent one's self-being the victim of a homosexual act."
- On 24 June 2011, The Bahamas Plays and Films Control Board attempted to block the showing of the Bahamian-produced, gay-themed movie Children of God in the public square in downtown Nassau. However, on this occasion, the government overruled the board and allowed the movie to be shown.

=== Anti-LGBT violence ===
There have been numerous cases involving the murder of a homosexual man, and none of them have been solved.

The names of the victims, their professions, and dates of death are as follows:

- Kevin Williams, Policeman, 15 May 2001
- Thaddeus McDonald, Lecturer, 16 November 2007
- Harl Taylor, Designer, 18 November 2007
- Wellington Adderley, Activist, 26 May 2008
- Marvin Wilson, Waiter, 3 June 2008
- Paul Whylly, Dancer, 19 October 2008
- Shavado Simmons, Photographer, 17 July 2011
- Elkin Moss, Waiter, 20 July 2013
- Devince Smith, Banker, 25 December 2015

Accused in 2007 for the slaying of handbag designer Harl Taylor, Troyniko McNeil was found not guilty.

Events and instances where Anti-LGBT violence occur:

- An American man who was allegedly attacked by a group of persons during a concert at Bahamas Junkanoo Carnival early Saturday morning is alleging that he was "targeted and beat up" because he is gay.

== LGBT rights movement in the Bahamas ==
Due to a lack of confidence in the judicial system, legal inequalities, and homophobia in the Bahamas, many LGBT people keep their sexual orientation or gender identity private. While LGBT rights organizations have been permitted to exist, LGBT groups are often pressured to keep their social events hidden. The former LGBT rights group, the Rainbow Alliance of The Bahamas, launched a public campaign against discrimination and participated in talk shows on the subject. Today, Bahamas LGBT Equality Advocates and the DMARCO Foundation are speaking out against homophobia through social media.

A new day of advocacy came for the LGBT community of the Bahamas when transgender women started taking the lead on LGBT issues. The Bahamas Transgender Intersex United (BTIU) launched its multi-level equality campaign, "Bahamian Trans Lives Matter" on 26 April 2016, which seeks to secure equal rights for transgender Bahamians. BTIU President and Founder of the DMARCO Foundation, Alexus D'Marco, stepped up and engaged the national conversation at a press conference held in Nassau, Bahamas, where she was joined by other women to bring awareness to the overlooked issues transgender people often face. These women sparked controversy as an Equality Referendum was about to take place in the country.

The Prime Minister stated, "I want to be clear: these bills do not propose radical change. Instead, this is about making sure that the supreme law of the land reflects our values and our commitment to fairness." The bill did not legalize same-sex marriage in the Bahamas nor was it inclusive to the transgender or intersex community. This movement sparked outrage from a member of the government, Leslie Miller, who publicly called for the "Exile of Transgender out of the Bahamas." Miller had forcefully denounced the growing transgender community in this country, while urging people to financially contribute to having this sect of society exiled to their own private island to ensure "they stay out of the way". He pledged to give the group its first $1,000 toward this relocation.

In 2019, the "Bahamas Organisation of LGBTI Affairs" was formed. It aims to formalize a means of public sensitization and education of LGBTI issues.

== Public opinion ==
In 2013, Foreign Affairs Minister Fred Mitchell said that Bahamians should accept a gay or lesbian politician. However a survey revealed that his views are not shared by the population with only 12% showing positive feelings towards a gay or lesbian person running for office. Over 84% all respondents said they strong disapproved of the idea of a gay or lesbian politician.

In 2015, a survey published in The Nassau Guardian reports that 85.5% of respondents strongly disapprove of same-sex marriage, with only 10.6% approving of it.

== Summary table ==
Same-sex relationships legal	Yes Since 1991
Equal age of consent	Yes
Anti-discrimination laws in employment	No
Anti-discrimination laws in the provision of goods and services	No
Anti-discrimination laws in all other areas (incl. indirect discrimination, hate speech)	Yes / No Limited protection on incitement to hatred
Same-sex marriage(s)	No
Recognition of same-sex couples	No
Step-child adoption by same-sex couples	No
Joint adoption by same-sex couples	No
Gays and lesbians allowed to serve openly in the military	Yes
Right to change legal gender	No
Access to IVF for lesbians	No
Commercial surrogacy for gay male couples	No
MSMs allowed to donate blood	Yes

== See also ==
- Politics of Bahamas
- LGBT rights in the Commonwealth of Nations
- LGBT rights in the Americas
- LGBT rights by country or territory
