= LGBTQ rights in Dominica =

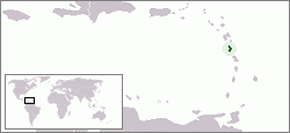
- Dominica
- Legal status: Legal since 2024
- Gender identity: No
- Military: Has no military
- Discrimination protections: None

Family rights
- Recognition of relationships: No recognition of same-sex unions
- Adoption: No

Lesbian, gay, bisexual, transgender, and queer (LGBTQ) people in Dominica face legal challenges not experienced by non-LGBTQ residents. Homosexuality has been legal since 2024, when the High Court struck down the country's colonial-era sodomy law. Dominica provides no recognition to same-sex unions, whether in the form of marriage or civil unions, and no law prohibits discrimination on the basis of sexual orientation or gender identity.

== Legality of same-sex sexual activity ==
Recognition of same-sex unions in the Lesser Antilles and Puerto Rico Same-sex marriage Unregistered cohabitation Island subject to IACHR advisory opinion No recognition of same-sex couples Constitutional ban on same-sex marriage Same-sex sexual activity illegal but penalties not enforced

The Dominica High Court ruled that Dominica's laws against sodomy between consenting adults were unconstitutional on 22 April 2024.

Prior to that ruling, both male and female types of same-sex sexual activity were illegal in Dominica, as was anal intercourse between persons of the opposite sex.

Between 1995 and 2000, 35 people were arrested by local authorities and charged with buggery. The courts sentenced all the offenders to fines and prison sentences up to ten years. Some were sent to local psychiatric hospitals for "treatment". In 2001, 15 women were arrested and sentenced to five years' imprisonment. The charge brought against them was gross indecency. Ten men were also sentenced to five years' imprisonment for "engaging in gross indecency with people of the same sex."

The Sexual Offenses Act 1998, as amended in 2016, had two sections dealing with same-sex sexual activity, both of which were partially struck down by the court.

Section 14. (1) Any person who commits an act of gross indecency with another person is guilty of an offence and liable on conviction to imprisonment—

(a) if the complainant is a person sixteen years of age or more, for twelve years;
(b) if the complainant is a minor under sixteen years of age, for fourteen years for a first offence and to imprisonment for twenty years for a subsequent offence.”;
(2) Subsection (1) does not apply to an act of gross indecency committed in private between an adult male person and an adult female person, both whom consent.
* * * *
(4) In this section, "gross indecency" means—
(a) an act other than sexual intercourse (whether natural or unnatural) by a person involving the use of the genital organ for the purpose of arousing or gratifying sexual desire...

Section 16. (1) A person who commits buggery is guilty of an offence and liable upon conviction to imprisonment for -
(a) twenty-five years, if committed by an adult on a minor;
(b) ten years, if committed by an adult on another adult;
(c) five years, if committed by a minor;
and if the Court thinks it fit, the Court may order that the convicted person be admitted to a psychiatric hospital for treatment.
(2) Any person who attempts to commit the offence of buggery, or is guilty of an assault with intent to commit the same, is guilty of an offence and liable to imprisonment for four years, and, if the Court thinks it fit, the Court may order that the convicted person be admitted to a psychiatric hospital for treatment.
(3) In this section, "buggery" means sexual intercourse per anum by a male person with a male person....

The court ruled that section 14(2) shall be read as "Subsection (1) does not apply to an act of gross indecency committed in private between adult persons both whom consent." and section 16(1)(b) shall be read as "ten years, if committed by an adult on another adult, save and except where the act which would otherwise constitute the offence is done in private between consenting adults."

=== Decriminalisation efforts ===
In 2013, Catholic Bishop Gabriel Malzaire called for the repeal of the law, saying,

I wish to make it clear that the Catholic Church in Dominica adheres to the call of the Holy See in its statement to the 63rd session of the General Assembly of the United Nations on the Declaration of Human Rights, sexual orientation and gender identity, "to condemn all forms of violence against homosexual persons as well as to urge all States to take necessary measures to put an end to all criminal penalties against them. …" The Catholic Church maintains that free sexual acts between adult persons must not be treated as crimes to be punished by civil authorities.

In 2014, Prime Minister Roosevelt Skerrit said that "Dominica does not enforce its law against homosexual activity, at least in private homes, and has no plans to do so."

In June 2019, a gay man in Dominica who wishes to remain anonymous announced plans to challenge the country's buggery law, with the help of the Canadian HIV/AIDS Legal Network, a Toronto-based advocacy group, the University of Toronto's International Human Rights Program, Minority Rights Dominica (MiRiDom), an LGBTQ advocacy group, and Lawyers Without Borders. The gay man has faced homophobic hostility, discrimination, harassment, threats, and physical and sexual assaults fueled by this law. In one instance, he was viciously attacked in his own home, yet police refused to investigate and allowed his attacker to remain free because of his sexuality, arguing that under Dominican law gay people are considered criminals. The man officially filed the lawsuit with Dominica's High Court of Justice in July 2019, challenging two provisions of the Sexual Offenses Act that criminalises anal sex and "gross indecency" with up to 10 years and 12 years in prison, respectively.

In April 2024, the High Court of Dominica ruled that sections 14 and 16 of the Sexual Offences Act, that criminalised consensual same-sex activity between adults, were unconstitutional.

== Official support of LGBT rights ==
In 2011, the Dominican delegation to the United Nations signed onto the "Joint statement on ending acts of violence and related human rights violations based on sexual orientation and gender identity". It is the only UN member state in the Lesser Antilles to have done so.

== Social conditions ==
=== Opposition to gay tourists ===
Bill Daniel, president of the Evangelical Association speaking on behalf of the group, made the following statement in 2009: "We want the government to ensure that gay tourists do not come to the island and conduct themselves in any immoral way." The association protested against allowing gay cruises to visit the island and promoting Dominica as a "gay tourist destination".

=== Anti-LGBT violence ===
There have been suspected hate crimes against individuals believed to be homosexuals in Dominica. Persons in a dispute may use derogatory words like "buggerman" or "battyman" to refer to "effeminate" men.

In 2010, a Portsmouth man, Clement James, was stabbed to death after being accused of "watching" his male assailant in a public place. The accused, Davis St Jean, allegedly had a habit of singing and preaching aloud in the street about killing gay people. Before stabbing Clement, he reportedly said "all battie boi must dead".

=== LGBT culture ===
A 2011 academic submission to the United Nations stated that LGBTQ groups in Dominica are forced to operate underground because of fear that their members will be victimised. Members who are openly gay complain of acts of vandalism committed against their property. Reports made to the police are not taken seriously and the victims are sometimes ridiculed.

=== LGBT associations ===
Minority Rights Dominica (MiRiDom) is an LGBTQ advocacy group in Dominica, working to advance LGBTQ rights in the country. Its founder is Darryl Philip.

== Summary table ==
Same-sex sexual activity legal	Yes (Since 2024)
Equal age of consent (16)	Yes (Since 2024)
Anti-discrimination laws in employment only	No
Anti-discrimination laws in the provision of goods and services	No
Anti-discrimination laws in all other areas (incl. indirect discrimination, hate speech)	No
Same-sex marriages	No
Recognition of same-sex couples	No
Step-child adoption by same-sex couples	No
Joint adoption by same-sex couples	No
Gays and lesbians allowed to serve openly in the military	Has no military
Right to change legal gender	No
Access to IVF for lesbians	No
Commercial surrogacy for gay male couples	No
MSMs allowed to donate blood	No

== See also ==
- Politics of Dominica
- LGBT rights in the Commonwealth of Nations
- LGBT rights in La Francophonie
- LGBT rights in the Americas
- LGBT rights by country or territory
