= Timeline of LGBTQ history in Venezuela =

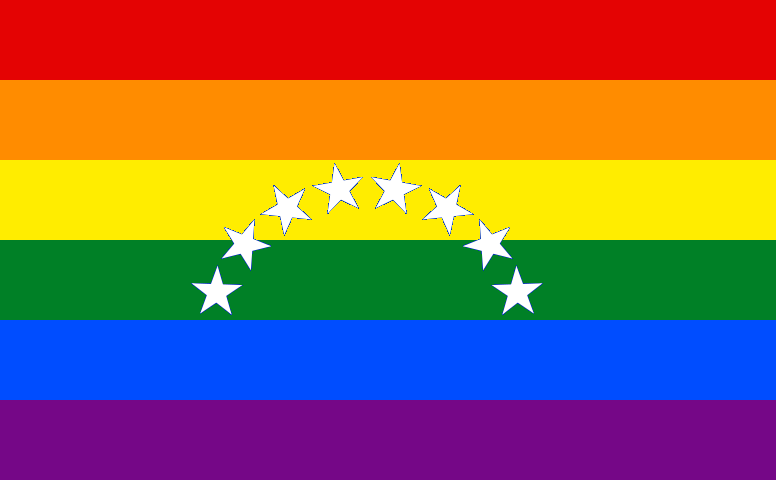
Flag of the Venezuelan LGBTQ Community

This chronology documents some of the most important events in the history of the LGBTQ community in Venezuela

== 18th Century ==
=== 1765 ===
- Joseph Díaz, a soldier in Puerto Cabello, imprisoned in the San Juan de Ulúa prison for sodomy with an eighteen-year-old boy.

=== 1772 ===
- A decree is issued by the Province of Venezuela prohibiting crossdressing.

=== 1774 ===
- Mariano Martí, Bishop of Caracas, publicly condemned two women for "liv[ing] badly with another" (i.e. in a Lesbian relationship).

== 19th Century ==
=== 1836 ===
- With the implementation of Venezuela's first Penal Code, homosexual activity is not subject to criminal penalties.

== 20th Century ==
=== 1923 ===
- Vice President of Venezuela, Juan Crisóstomo Gómez was assassinated in Caracas. Gómez died from being stabbed 27 times. One theory for the motive of the assassination is linked to speculation that Gómez was having a homosexual affair with a military cadet.

=== 1939 ===
- The Law on Vagrants and Criminals was first introduced. While not banning same-sex activity, it was used as a pretext to detain and re-educate homosexual people deemed dangerous.

=== 1957 ===
- The Law on Vagrants and Criminals was reformed, making it easier to imprison homosexuals and transvestites.

=== 1960s ===
- Actress Karla Luzbel became one of the first Venezuelan celebrities to undergo gender-affirming surgery.

=== 1971 ===
- Novelist and playwright, Isaac Chocrón, generated controversy over two works, La revolución and Pájaro de mar por tierra, published that year dealing with homosexuality and transvesticism.

=== 1972 ===
- The Caracas Metropolitan Police carry out a raid on a residency in the Petare neighbourhood of Caracas where an unofficial LGBTQ edition of the Miss Venezuela competition was being held.

=== 1976 ===
- Demonstrations are held by members and supporters of the homosexual community against the series of songs by musicians Simón Díaz and Hugo Blanco called Las Gaitas de las Locas containing homophobic and offensive jokes.

=== 1980 ===
- The first publication about LGBTQ issues, Entendido, is first circulated. The magazine ran until 1983.

=== 1983 ===
- The short documentary Trans about the lives of the LGBTQ community in Caracas was premiered at the Cinemateca Nacional de Venezuela.

=== 1993 ===
- Venezuela's Environmental Movement (MAV), the first non-governmental organization focused on LGBTQ issues was founded by activist Oswaldo Reyes.

=== 1995 ===
- Canada accepts José Luis Ortigoza as a refugee after he had been tortured and raped multiple times by the Venezuelan security forces on the basis of his homosexuality.

=== 1997 ===
- MAV organises the first pride parade on June 27 in Caracas on the Sabana Grande boulevard.
- The Supreme Court of Justice of Venezuela rules the Law on Vagrants and Criminals unconstitutional.

=== 1997 ===
- The Lambda Alliance of Venezuela was founded by dissidents of MAV. It has since become one of the largest sexual diversity organisations in Venezuela.

=== 1999 ===
- MAV presented its founder, Oswaldo Reyes, as the first openly gay candidate for the 1999 Venezuelan Constituent Assembly election. However, he was not elected.

== 21st Century ==
=== 2000 ===
- The Affirmative Union of Venezuela is founded.

=== 2001 ===
- The first official Caracas Pride is held, organised by the Lambda Alliance of Venezuela, the Affirmative Union of Venezuela and others.

=== 2002 ===
- The leftist Gay Revolutionary Movement of Venezuela is founded to present an alternative for supporters of Hugo Chavez.

=== 2005 ===
- In an event organised by the Metropolitan District of Caracas, the Pride flag is flown, for the first time, in Bolívar Square.

=== 2006 ===
- A male couple register their marriage in the British Embassy in Caracas under British law, making them the first same-sex couple to register their union in Venezuela.

=== 2008 ===
- The Supreme Tribunal of Justice ruled that the denial of recognition to same-sex couples is not unconstitutional.
- The Gay Revolutionary Movement of Venezuela is dissolved and replaced with the United Socialist Bloc for Homosexual Liberation. It follows the same ideals of its predecessor but is more closely integrated into the United Socialist Party of Venezuela.

=== 2009 ===
- The Network of Lesbians, Gays, Bisexuals, Trans and Intersexuals of Venezuela is founded as an umbrella group for sexual diversity activist groups. Founding members include the Lambda Alliance of Venezuela and the Affirmative Union of Venezuela

=== 2011 ===
- The municipality of El Hatillo and the Metropolitan Council of Caracas voted to recognize May 17 as International Day Against Homophobia, Biphobia and Transphobia.

=== 2013 ===
- Deputy of the United Socialist Party of Venezuela, Pedro Carreño called the Governor of Miranda Henrique Capriles a faggot during a debate in the National Assembly.
- The LGBTQ+ awareness campaign No Soy Tu Chiste is started by artivist Daniel Arzola.

=== 2014 ===
- Over 40 organisations present a bill with over 20,000 signatures that would allow for same-sex marriage to the National Assembly of Venezuela. The bill would, however, never enter into consideration.
- The film Blue and Not So Pink, which deals with many controversial topics in Venezuela including homophobic violence and transsexualism, wins the Goya Award for Best Ibero-American Film, the first time a Venezuelan film to do so.

=== 2015 ===
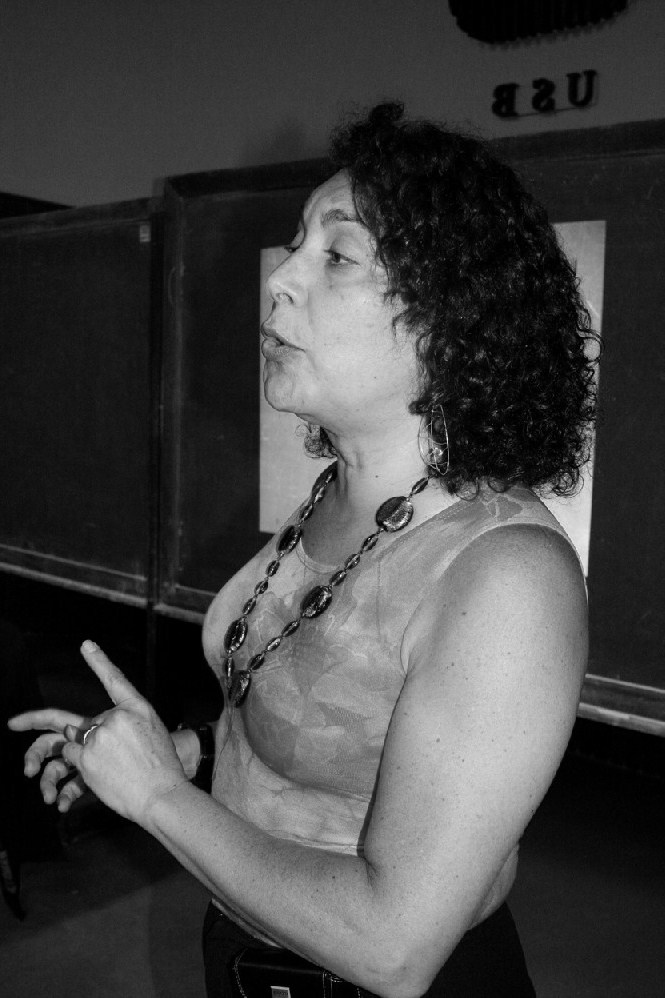
Tamara Adrián, the first transgender elected to a national office in Venezuela

- In the 2015 Venezuelan parliamentary election, Tamara Adrián and Rosmit Mantilla were elected as Alternate Deputies of the National Assembly of Venezuela as members of the Popular Will party. They are the first transgender and openly gay politicians, respectively, elected to national office in Venezuela.

=== 2016 ===
- The Supreme Tribunal of Justice rules to recognise the double maternity of a son conceived by assisted reproductive technology by Migdely Miranda Rondón and Giniveth Soto. The Tribunal also rules that same-sex couples could form families and should have the same rights as a heterosexual couple.

=== 2018 ===
- The first organisation dedicated entirely to the rights and recognition of intersex people, Intersex Venezuela is founded.

=== 2022 ===
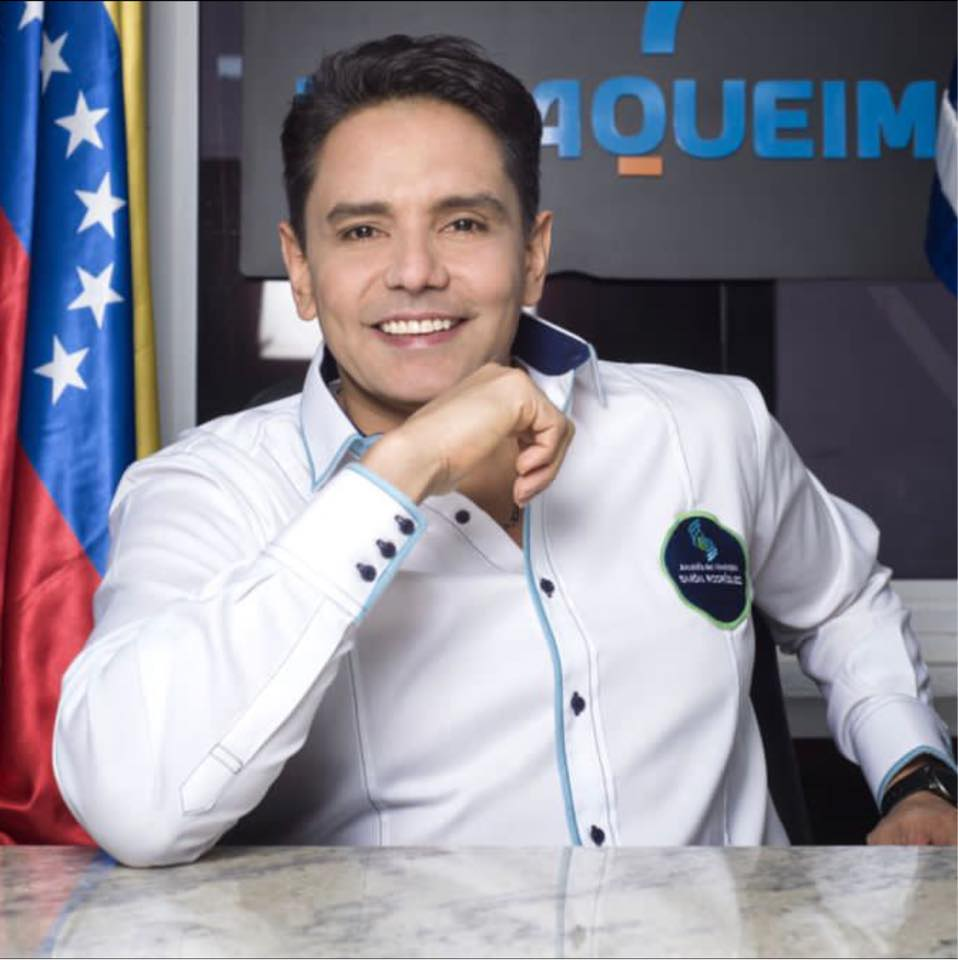
Ernesto Paraqueima, mayor of the city of El Tigre

- Mayor of the city of El Tigre and opposition politician, Ernesto Paraqueima announced a decree establishing symbolic cohabitation contracts for same-sex couples. The event did not materialize and instead tourist packages were established for LGBTQ+ couples that included an "agreement of wills", but without legal validity.

=== 2023 ===
- The Supreme Tribunal of Justice strikes down Article 565 of the Organic Code of Military Justice which prohibits members of the Bolivarian National Armed Forces of Venezuela from engaging in "sexual acts against nature."
- 33 gay men are arrested in the Avalon Club Raid, where police forces raided a gay nightclub for public indecency.

=== 2026 ===
- A raid is carried out on a LGBTQ+ sauna in the city of Barquisimeto. Over 28 people were arrested by police. The raid was condemned by many LGBTQ+ activist groups as an act of extortion and discrimination.

== See also ==
- LGBTQ rights in Venezuela
- Human rights in Venezuela
- Recognition of same-sex unions in Venezuela
- LGBTQ History in Venezuela
