= Venezuelan Observatory of LGBTIQ+ Violence =

Venezuelan LGBTQ+ organization

- Formation: 7 October 2022
- Founded at: Venezuela
- Type: Non-governmental organization
- Coordinator: Yendri Velásquez
- Key people: Glorielys Pérez; Jeffrey Rodríguez
- Website: nomasdiscriminacion.org

The Venezuelan Observatory of LGBTIQ+ Violence is a non-governmental organization dedicated to “collect, document, systematize and make visible data and information on discriminatory acts” of the LGBT community in Venezuela.

== History ==
Founded on 7 October 2022, the observatory counted in its first bulletin “31 cases of discrimination or violence against LGBTIQ+ people” during the first three quarters of the same year.

By 2024, the organization documented 137 transfemicides since 2008, and the same year published the 2023 annual report in which it recorded 461 cases of discrimination or violence against the LGBT community in the country: discriminatory speeches (235), discriminatory incidents (160), crimes based on prejudice (50), intra-gender violence (8), extreme violence (4), self-inflicted violence (3) and disappearances (1). Among the events denounced by the observatory were the raid of the Avalon Club in Valencia and the arbitrary detention of 33 LGBTIQ+ people, as well as the detention of trans activist Zikiu Rivas in Anzoátegui state.

== See also ==
- LGBTQ rights in Venezuela
- Recognition of same-sex unions in Venezuela
- Venezuelan Observatory of Social Conflict
