= Venezuela's Environmental Movement =

Defunct Venezuelan LGBTQ rights organization

- Movimiento Ambiente de Venezuela
- Abbreviation: MAV
- Formation: December 9, 1993; 32 years ago
- Dissolved: September 2005; 21 years ago
- Type: LGBTQ rights group
- Headquarters: Caracas
- Publication: Igual Género

Venezuela's Environmental Movement (Spanish: Movimiento Ambiente de Venezuela, MAV) was a Venezuelan LGBTQ rights group founded by veteran LGBTQ rights campaigner, Oswaldo Reyes in 1993. It was the first LGBTQ rights organization registered in the country.

== History ==
The MAV was founded by former activists of the group behind the Entendido magazine, including Oswaldo Reyes, Richard Gómez, Cesar Sequera Nuñez, María Peña, Ángel Vivas, Carmen Rodríguez, and Marianela Ruiz, in response to “La televisión, homosexualismo y agresividad,” a letter accusing homosexuals of corrupting children. They met weekly in El Silencio to discuss human rights, repression against LGBTQ people and political oppression.

They published a magazine called Igual Género (Gender Equality) from 1994 until 1997. It was the first sexuality focused publication in Venezuela.

MAV led campaigns against police abuse of LGBTQ people and carried out activities to help prevent sexually transmitted infections, especially HIV/AIDS-related groups. They also helped organise the first Caracas Pride, on June 29, 1997, at Sabana Grande.

In January 1998, several members of the MAV left the organisation to form the Lambda Alliance of Venezuela, which came to be one of the leading forces in the LGBTQ rights movement in Venezuela. Later the Affirmative Union of Venezuela also split from MAV.

In 1998, founder Oswaldo Reyes ran for the 1999 Venezuelan Constituent Assembly election He was the first openly gay candidate to run for election in Venezuela. However, he was not elected.

After Reyes' death in September 2005, the movement fell inactive. However, it is seen as the progenitor of the Venezuelan LGBTQ movement. MAV was succeeded by a total of 14 organisations.

== See Also ==
- LGBTQ rights in Venezuela
- Timeline of LGBTQ history in Venezuela
- Gay Revolutionary Movement of Venezuela
