= Gay Revolutionary Movement of Venezuela =

- Movimiento Gay Revolucionario de Venezuela
- Abbreviation: MGRV
- Successor: United Socialist Bloc for Homosexual Liberation
- Formation: November 6, 2002; 23 years ago
- Dissolved: 2008
- Type: LGBTQ rights group

The Gay Revolutionary Movement of Venezuela (Spanish: Movimiento Gay Revolucionario de Venezuela, MGRV) was a left-wing and Chavista LGBTQ rights group in Venezuela founded in 2002.

== History ==
The MGRV was founded in November 2002 by LGBTQ supporters of president Hugo Chávez and his Fifth Republic Movement (Later the United Socialist Party of Venezuela). Its spokesperson was also the spokesperson Youth Commission for Sexual Minorities of the Youth of the Fifth Republic Movement, Heisler Vaamonde.

In 2005, the Movement presented Vaamonde as their candidate for the 2005 Venezuelan parliamentary election in the Libertador Municipality of Caracas under the label of the Partido Verdad Libre. He was not elected, however.

Earlier in 2005, the movement issued a communique denying the publication of a pamphlet called ¡¡¡Bolívar era gay!!!! (Bolivar was gay!) which was being credited to the movement.

The movement provided and operated seminars, LGBTQ entrepreneur support programs, discussions, debates and sporting events, amongst others.

With the formation of the United Socialist Party of Venezuela (PSUV), in 2008 the movement was dissolved and reformed into the Bloque Socialista Unido de Liberación Homosexual which was more closely incorporated into the framework of PSUV.

== See also ==
- Lambda Alliance of Venezuela
- Venezuela's Environmental Movement
- Timeline of LGBTQ history in Venezuela
- LGBTQ rights in Venezuela
- LGBT History in Venezuela
