= Avalon Club police raid =

On 23 July 2023, a police raid happened in the Avalon Club in the city of Valencia, Venezuela, in which 33 homosexual men were arrested by the Venezuelan police. The raid was purportedly conducted after an anonymous call tipped the police. The prosecution later charged the arrested men with outrage of modesty amongst other crimes. On 26 July 2023, 30 of the 33 people who were detained earlier were released after a court hearing, while the other three people including the owner of the club were not released.

== Background ==
The Avalon Club is located in the Los Sauces sector of the city of Valencia in the state of Carabobo. On 23 July 2023, the Bolivarian National Police conducted a raid on the club, and arrested 33 homosexual men. The arrested belonged to various age groups ranging from 21 to 57 years, and the officials seized cell phones, condoms, and other recording devices from the detainees.

== Aftermath ==
The prosecution charged the arrested men with outrage of modesty and noise pollution, among other crimes. As per reports, the arrest occurred after an anonymous call came to the police in which it was reported that some people were practicing group sex at the club and some of them allegedly were HIV infected. As per Venezuelan law, consensual sex between adults in not a crime. However, officials of the Bolivarian National Police said that the detainees were recording the events with the aim of marketing the material as pornography, which is a crime.

The detainees were initially transferred to the police facility located in Los Guayos. The police later released the photographs of the arrested members. The detainees were then transported to the Palace of Justice of Valencia in pickup trucks by the police. On 26 July 2023, 30 of the 33 people who were detained earlier were released after a court hearing. the other three people, which included the owner of Avalon Club and two masseurs, were held sent to prison.

== Reactions ==
Amnesty International called for the release of the 33 men and denouncing homophobia in Venezuela, and for peaceful protests calling for the release of detainees and trial of those involved in the detention. As per local media, sections of the public considered that the act of releasing the photographs and identities of the detainees indicated a lack of respect towards the homosexual community, and was a discriminatory measure done purely due to their sexual orientation.

The Civil Association Venezuela condemned the action of the police against the LGBTQ community and called for the Attorney General to fairly investigate the matter.

== See also ==
- LGBT rights in Venezuela
