= Aleksandr Baranov =

Aleksandr Baranov may refer to:

- Alexander Andreyevich Baranov (1746–1819), first Chief Manager of the Russian America Company
- Aleksandr Baranov (actor) (1914–1995), Soviet actor; see The Adventures of Buratino (1959 film)
- Aleksandr Baranov (general) (1946–2025), Russian Army Colonel General
- Aleksander Baranov (director) (born 1955), Russian film director and screenwriter of Catherine
- Aleksandr Baranov (skater), Soviet former 5000m speed skating world record holder
- Alyaksandr Baranaw (born 1974), Belarusian footballer

== See also ==
- Alexander Barankov (born 1981), Belarusian whistleblower
