= Nixon Moreno =

Venezuelan activist

- Born: February 9, 1974 (age 52)
- Education: Los Andes University

Nixon Moreno (February 9, 1974) is a Venezuelan who studied at Los Andes University (ULA); he was leader of the M-13 student group, and former president of the Student Federation.

== Legal troubles and asylum ==
Moreno has been accused of an attempt to rape a local police woman, Sofía Aguilar, and leaving several policemen wounded in a confrontation during a student protest in 2006. The protest was led by Moreno against a court decision that suspended the election of the Student Federation. Venezuelan justice has been looking for Moreno since then.

Aguilar identified Moreno as her attacker in a statement to state media (Venezolana de Television). In June, 2006, a National Assembly commission, presided by Deputy Obdulio Camacho, concluded that the accusations were untrue. The ULA President, other authorities, and TV footage indicate that at the hour of the events reported by Aguilar, Moreno was in a clinic at another end of the city, receiving treatment for a face wound caused by a plastic shot (which Aguilar did not mention).

On October 7, 2008, Aguilar said in a TV interview that she was "humiliated by the attitude the Church has taken" by granting asylum to Moreno "without a Church authority asking me first about the events," but she "now does not want the Church to ask anything." In September, 2008, Aguilar was postulated as candidate for the Mérida State Legislature by the group Tupamaro, which firmly supports Chávez's government. Chávez opponents claim Aguilar is being paid to incriminate Moreno.

Moreno is the only person indicted for the accusations, even though many other persons were implicated. He has been publicly presumed guilty by Chávez. For example, in his Annual Address of the Presidency at the National Assembly in January 2008, Chávez said, "Mr Ambassador... you have a delinquent [Moreno] protected there [in the Embassy]; you should turn him to the authorities."

On March 13, 2007, he asked for asylum in the Apostolic Nunciature (Holy See) to avoid capture. On November 12, 2007, Moreno was granted a ULA degree as a politician. The graduation ceremony was performed at the nunciature. Asylum was granted confidentially on June 11, 2008 and made public in September, 2008. Chávez's government did not issue the corresponding safe conduct for Moreno to travel out of Venezuela.

On March 9, 2009, Moreno left the Apostolic Nunciature and is currently living in Peru, where he was granted political asylum.

== See also ==
- List of people granted political asylum
