= Ilyas Akhmadov =

Chechen diplomat (born 1960)

Ilyas Khamzatovich Akhmadov
- Ilyasaŋ Aẋmad-k̇ant Ẋamzat; Ильясан Ахьмад-кlант Хьамзат
- Akhmadov in 1999

Minister of Foreign Affairs of the Chechen Republic of Ichkeria
- In office 1999–2004
- President: Aslan Maskhadov
- Preceded by: Akhyad Idigov
- Succeeded by: Usman Ferzauli

Personal details
- Born: December 19, 1960 (age 65) Kazakh Soviet Socialist Republic, Soviet Union
- Relations: Khamzat Akhmadov (father)

Military service
- Allegiance: Chechen Republic of Ichkeria
- Branch/service: Armed Forces of the Chechen Republic of Ichkeria
- Years of service: 1991–2004
- Rank: Colonel (Polkovnik)
- Battles/wars: First Chechen War: Battle of Grozny (1994–1995); Second Chechen War

Ilyas Khamzatovich Akhmadov (Chechen: Ilyasaŋ Aẋmad-k̇ant Ẋamzat/Ильясан Ахьмад-кlант Хьамзат, Russian: Ильяс Хамзатович Ахмадов; born December 19, 1960) served as the foreign minister of the Chechen Republic of Ichkeria. He currently resides in the United States, where he was granted political asylum.

== Biography ==
Akhmadov was born on December 19, 1960, in Kazakhstan, where most of the Chechen nation—including his family—had been exiled by Stalin's government in 1944. The Akhmadovs returned to Chechnya in 1962.

From 1978 to 1981 Ilyas Akhmadov studied in the Polytechnic University of Volgograd. After graduation, he served for four years as a sergeant major in the Red Army's Strategic Missile Forces. He left the army in 1985 as a Third Lieutenant, and in 1991 he graduated with distinction in political science from the Rostov University.

Returning to Chechnya, which had declared independence from Russia in the aftermath of the dissolution of the Soviet Union in 1991, he took a job in the political department of the Chechen Ministry of Foreign Affairs. In August 1994 Akhmadov was wounded during the fighting with forces of the warlord Ruslan Labazanov in Argun.

After the First Chechen War broke in 1994, Akhmadov fought against the Russian federal forces, serving first as a volunteer fighter and then as the public affairs officer to Aslan Maskhadov, the Chechen headquarters' chief of staff. In 1996 he retired to private life.

=== Exile ===
On July 29, 1999, a month before the beginning of the Second Chechen War, the President of Ichkeria Aslan Maskhadov appointed Ilyas Akhmadov as Foreign Minister. Soon, Akhmadov and his colleagues in the separatist government dispersed and went into hiding, with some again taking up arms against the Russians. Akhmadov himself left Chechnya.

In his appeals and meetings with the representatives of UN, OSCE, PACE, European Parliament, UNHCR, U.S. Congress, the U.S. presidential administration and international NGOs, he called for observance of human rights during the conflict. In January 2000, Akhmadov visited the United States, where he met with officials of the State Department. He embarked on a tour of Western capitals, returning twice to the United States in 2000 and again in 2001. This provoked complaints from Russia, which alleged that he was involved in terrorism in Chechnya and elsewhere in Russia.

In 2002 Akhmadov claimed asylum in the United States but his initial bid was turned down after opposition from the United States Department of Homeland Security. However, he gained support from members of the U.S. Congress and peace campaigners, who saw him as a moderate (indeed, Akhmadov has repeatedly criticised suicide bombings and hostage-takings by Chechen extremists and has campaigned for peace talks to end the war). In April 2004 an Immigration Judge in Boston issued an order granting Akhmadov asylum in the United States; that ruling became effective in August 2004 following the U.S. Government's abrupt withdrawal of its notice of appeal of the Immigration Judge's decision.

== See also ==
- List of people granted political asylum

== Bibliography ==
- Ilyas Akhmadov, Miriam Lanskoy. The Chechen Struggle: Independence Won and Lost. - Palgrave Macmillan, 2010. ISBN 0-230-10534-3
