= List of people granted asylum =

This is a list of people granted political asylum for individual and publicly known reasons. They were persecuted because of their actions as individuals, not because they were members of a persecuted group. Individual reasons for persecution can be found in the notes column of the table.

== People granted asylum ==
Year	Name	Citizenship or Persecuting power or Country refusing protection	Country which granted asylum	Occupation	Notes / References
1849	Karl Marx	Prussia	United Kingdom	German philosopher, economist, sociologist, journalist and revolutionary socialist	In exile in London from 1849.
1929	Leon Trotsky	Soviet Union	Turkey	Soviet politician, and the founder and first leader of the Red Army	In exile in Turkey from 1929 to 1933, in France 1933–1935, in Norway 1935–1937, in Mexico 1937–1940.
1929	Leon Trotsky	Soviet Union	France	Soviet politician, and the founder and first leader of the Red Army	In exile in Turkey from 1929 to 1933, in France 1933–1935, in Norway 1935–1937, in Mexico 1937–1940.
1929	Leon Trotsky	Soviet Union	Norway	Soviet politician, and the founder and first leader of the Red Army	In exile in Turkey from 1929 to 1933, in France 1933–1935, in Norway 1935–1937, in Mexico 1937–1940.
1929	Leon Trotsky	Soviet Union	Mexico	Soviet politician, and the founder and first leader of the Red Army	In exile in Turkey from 1929 to 1933, in France 1933–1935, in Norway 1935–1937, in Mexico 1937–1940.
1954	Peter Norwood Duberg	United States	Switzerland	United States citizen, United Nations official, employed in Paris at UNESCO	For reasons of his early adulthood membership in the Communist Party, Duberg, along with several other U.S. citizens working in international organizations, became the subject of U.S. official investigation in the early 1950s. This led to a loyalty investigation by the U.S. State Department in 1953, also his name being discussed in the U.S. Congress House Committee on Un-American Activities. During 1953, while living in France, and working as an official at UNESCO (the United Nations Education and Scientific Organization) Mr. Duberg refused to answer a series of loyalty-related questionnaires. This resulted in decisions taken which led to termination of his professional employment at the United Nations in 1954. France refused to protect the Duberg family, leading to their need for political asylum. They applied for, and were granted asylum in Switzerland.
1954	Peter Norwood Duberg	France	Switzerland	United States citizen, United Nations official, employed in Paris at UNESCO	
1956	József Mindszenty	Hungary	United States (embassy)	Cardinal of the Catholic Church as the Archbishop of Esztergom in Hungary	
1956	József Mindszenty	Hungary	Austria	Cardinal of the Catholic Church as the Archbishop of Esztergom in Hungary	
1959	The 14th Dalai Lama, Tenzin Gyatso	Tibet	India	Head monk of the Gelugpa lineage of Tibetan Buddhism (Dalai Lama)	In exile in India since 1959. Currently residing in McLeod Ganj, Dharamshala from where he established the Tibetan Government in Exile.
1964–1976	João Goulart	Brazil	Uruguay	24º President of Brazil, deposed by the 1964 Brazilian coup d'état.	He sent a letter requesting the right of asylum on 3 April 1964 (Note: His wife, Maria Thereza Goulart, and his son João Vicente Goulart and his daughter Denize, were sent to Uruguay on 3 April with a letter asking for asylum. With that, the first-lady Maria Thereza Goulart became the first exiled Brazilian during the Military Dictatorship.) and went in exile on 4 April 1964. On 21 April he was conceded the asylum and only waived it on 9 November 1976, with the goal of returning to his home country, but died on 6 December.
1964–1979	Leonel Brizola	Brazil	Uruguay	Federal deputy from Guanabara (1963–1964).	Part of the opposition against the military dictatorship in Brazil, he had asylum from Uruguay from 3 May 1964 until his expulsion in 1977 and then had US asylum from 1977 to 1979.
1964–1979	Leonel Brizola	Brazil	United States	Federal deputy from Guanabara (1963–1964).	Part of the opposition against the military dictatorship in Brazil, he had asylum from Uruguay from 3 May 1964 until his expulsion in 1977 and then had US asylum from 1977 to 1979.
1967	Svetlana Alliluyeva	Soviet Union	United States	Writer and lecturer; daughter of Joseph Stalin	
1979	Mohammad Reza Pahlavi	Iran	Egypt	Shah of Iran	
1979	Mohammad Reza Pahlavi	Iran	Morocco	Shah of Iran	
1979	Mohammad Reza Pahlavi	Iran	Bahamas	Shah of Iran	
1979	Mohammad Reza Pahlavi	Iran	Mexico	Shah of Iran	
1979	Mohammad Reza Pahlavi	Iran	United States	Shah of Iran	
1979	Mohammad Reza Pahlavi	Iran	Panama	Shah of Iran	
1979	Mohammad Reza Pahlavi	Iran	Egypt	Shah of Iran	
1979–1980	Anastasio Somoza Debayle	Nicaragua	Paraguay	President of Nicaragua Anastasio Somoza Debayle	
1984	Assata Shakur	United States	Cuba	United States citizen, African-American activist, member of the Black Panther Party (BPP) and Black Liberation Army (BLA).	Escaped prison escapee in 1979, two years after being convicted in 1977 of the 1973 first degree murder of New Jersey State Trooper Werner Foerster.
1985	Walter Polovchak	Soviet Union	United States	Soviet-born Ukrainian youth who in 1980 then at age 12 was the youngest person to announce that he wanted to leave the Communist world and not return with his parents to what was then Soviet Ukraine. In 1985, after five years of court battles on October 3-his 18th birthday-he was able to stay permanently in the U.S. when he was sworn in as a U.S. citizen.	
1986	Choi Eun-hee	South Korea	United States	South Korean actress	
1986	Shin Sang-ok	South Korea	United States	South Korean film producer and director	
1992	November 1992 Venezuelan coup d'état attempt participants	Venezuela	Peru	Military officers	After the failure of the November 1992 Venezuelan coup d'état, most of its participants fled to Peru, where they were received by dictator Alberto Fujimori as political asylees. Carlos Andrés Pérez's government had previously severed diplomatic relations with Peru in April after Fujimori carried out a self-coup the same year.
1997	Christoph Meili	Switzerland	United States	National of Switzerland, bank-security guard and whistleblowers at the Union Bank of Switzerland (now UBS)	Mr. Meili was a security guard at UBS, where he witnessed the destruction of documents related to World War II accounts of Jews. He reported the destruction, and was subjected to prosecution, also death threats. The family fled to the United States and were granted political asylum via a private law passed specifically for the Meili family. Unhappy in the United States, Mr. Meili later returned to Switzerland safely.
1997/8	Nury Turkel	China	United States	Graduate student, later Commissioner on the United States Commission on International Religious Freedom	
1999–2004, 2007	Alex Konanykhin and his wife	Russia	United States	Russian entrepreneur, former banker	
2001	Mohamed El Ghanem	Egypt	Switzerland	Former officer of the Egyptian Ministry of Interior, lawyer, Doctor of Law and Professor.	Several years after receiving refugee status in Switzerland, Dr. El Ghanem later was arbitrarily detained without charge for refusing to collaborate with Swiss Federal Police in a spying project on local Muslim community. He remained detained without trial for six years. He was released into a hospital in Geneva, under control of the Prosecutor's office: He had brain damage from forced drugging in prison. As of 2023, his whereabouts are unknown.
2001	Alexander Litvinenko	Russia	United Kingdom	Former officer who served in the Soviet KGB and its Russian successor, the Federal Security Service (FSB)	
2002	Pedro Carmona	Venezuela	Colombia	Venezuelan businessman, declared interim President of Venezuela during the 2002 Venezuelan coup d'état attempt	
2003	Akhmed Zakayev	Russia	United Kingdom	Former Deputy Prime Minister and the current Prime Minister of the Chechen Republic of Ichkeria	
2003	Boris Berezovsky	Russia	United Kingdom	Former Russian government official, businessman and mathematician, member of Russian Academy of Sciences	
2004	Ilyas Akhmadov	Russia	United States	Former politician and foreign minister of the Chechen Republic of Ichkeria	
2005	Bobby Fischer	United States	Iceland	Chess Grandmaster and the 11th World Chess Champion, chess author	
2007	John Robles	United States	Russia	Leak site owner, English teacher, investigative journalist, writer, US foreign policy critic, publisher.	John Anthony Robles II is a Taino Indian born in Puerto Rico. He was the first and reportedly only ex-US citizen granted full asylum (along with his children) in the Russian Federation. In 2007 after being told to close his site, his US Passport was revoked by then Ambassador William Burns using the false claim that he owed the USA child support for his children in Russia and thus he was left stateless. John worked for the Russian Government and was granted asylum along with his two US born American children. John left the US in 1995 after attempting to expose CPS child trafficking and initiating the formation of a Grand Jury. On the day the Grand Jury was to convene with Robles providing testimony John was detained but not charged and accused of working for the KGB and the Russians. He was forced to leave the US with his children of whom he had full custody and to seek asylum. Robles was a correspondent, newsreader and political commentator for the Voice of Russia and quoted worldwide "Romney and his promise of 'Republican hell'". Foreign Policy. After 17 years he was granted Russian citizenship by President Putin in a decree signed on October 21, 2024.
2007	John Robles	Puerto Rico	Russia	Leak site owner, English teacher, investigative journalist, writer, US foreign policy critic, publisher.	
2007	Irakli Okruashvili	Georgia	France	Georgian politician	
2008	Chere Lyn Tomayko	United States	Costa Rica	United States citizen	Chere Lyn Tomayko, wanted in the United States for parental kidnapping, was granted asylum in June 2008 by Costa Rica. Tomayko's claims that her actions were justified by domestic violence she suffered were taken into account by the Costa Rican authorities.
2008	Nixon Moreno	Venezuela	Holy See		
2009	Manuel Rosales	Venezuela	Peru	Venezuelan educator and politician	
2010	Virginia Vallejo	Colombia	United States	Colombian writer, journalist, columnist, media personality, television anchorwoman, and socialite	Biography of the political asylee
2011	Savva Terentyev	Russia	Estonia	Russian blogger and musician	
2011	Al-Saadi Gaddafi	Libya	Niger	Third son of former Libyan leader Muammar Gaddafi; Libyan former association football player	
2012	Julian Assange	Australia	Ecuador (embassy)	Australian editor, activist, publisher and journalist	Assange was granted asylum in 2010 by Ecuador while in the U.K.: He was harbored in the Ecuadorian embassy in London. Ecuador rescinded Assange's asylum status and citizenship in 2019. Between April 2019-June 2024 Assange was imprisoned in HMP Belmarsh prison fighting extradition to the United States. In June 2024, Assange agreed to a plea deal with U.S. prosecutors. He pleaded guilty to an Espionage Act charge of conspiring to obtain and disclose classified U.S. national defence documents in return for a sentence of time served.
2012	Julian Assange	Sweden	Ecuador (embassy)	Australian editor, activist, publisher and journalist	
2012	Julian Assange	United Kingdom	Ecuador (embassy)	Australian editor, activist, publisher and journalist	
2012	Julian Assange	United States	Ecuador (embassy)	Australian editor, activist, publisher and journalist	
2012	Alexander Barankov	Belarus	Ecuador	Belarusian former policeman or army captain	
2012	Safia Farkash	Libya	Oman	Widow of former Libyan leader Muammar Gaddafi and former First Lady of Libya	
2012	Muhammad Gaddafi	Libya	Oman	Eldest son of the former Libyan leader Muammar Gaddafi; chairman of the General Posts and Telecommunications Company	
2012	Ayesha Gaddafi	Libya	Oman	Fifth child and only daughter of former Libyan Leader Muammar Gaddafi; Libyan mediator and military official, former UN Goodwill Ambassador, and lawyer	
2012	Hannibal Muammar Gaddafi	Libya	Oman	Fifth son of former Libyan leader Muammar Gaddafi; first consultant to the Management Committee of the General National Maritime Transport Company (GNMTC) of Libya	
2013	Edward Snowden	United States	Russia	United States citizen; CIA Officer. Former Booz Allen Hamilton employee worked as a system administrator under an NSA contract.	Granted temporary asylum in Russia. Granted Russian citizenship in 2022.
2014	Denise Harvey	United States	Canada	United States citizen	Granted asylum in Canada after being sentenced to 30 years in prison by a Florida court for having consensual sex with a 16-year-old teenage boy. The crime she was convicted of is not a crime in Canada (i.e., consensual sex between a 16-year-old and an adult not in a position of authority with respect to the teen) and the Canadian Immigration and Review Board ruled that the 30-year sentence was "cruel and unusual punishment".
2014	Suren Gazaryan	Russia	Estonia	Russian citizen, Green activist	Goldman Prize recipient in 2014
2014	Ali Abd Jalil	Malaysia	Sweden	Malaysian citizen, student activist	Granted asylum in Sweden after being detained by Royal Malaysia Police and served 22 days in prison for insulting royalty.
2014	Tamara Sujú	Venezuela	Czech Republic	Venezuelan lawyer and human rights activist	Granted international protection status for a period of ten renewable years.
2016	Mohamed Nasheed	Maldives	United Kingdom	Former President of the Maldives	
2017	Amos Yee	Singapore	United States	Singaporean blogger	Charged by the State Courts of Singapore after posting videos critical of religious communities in Singapore, and of Lee Kuan Yew. Later granted asylum in the United States.
2018	Nikola Gruevski	Macedonia	Hungary	Macedonian citizen, former Prime minister of Macedonia	
2018	Rosmit Mantilla	Venezuela	France	National Assembly deputy	
2019	Evo Morales	Bolivia	Mexico	Bolivian citizen, former President of Bolivia	
2020	Christopher Mark Doyon aka Commander X	United States	Mexico	US Citizen, Activist/Author	First US citizen in history to receive political asylum in Mexico. Granted refugee status for acts associated with Anonymous, and his support of Julian Assange & WikiLeaks. Doyen was granted humanitarian protection status, but Mexico did not provide real protection from U.S. removal-requests for Doyen: In 2021, a multi-agency team of American, Mexican and intergovernmental authorities (including the Mexican National Police, the U.S. FBI, U.S. Department of Homeland Security, the US State Department and Interpol) stormed the compound in which he resided in Mexico city and deported him without a hearing. He was presented to U.S. authorities in Northern California, where he pled guilty (via plea-deal) to hacking the city of Santa Cruz, was imprisoned for about a year; he was released, in 2022.
2021	Nathan Law	China	United Kingdom	Hong Kong resident, politician and activist	Self Exiled in United Kingdom after China's increasing control over Hong Kong.
2021	Tuhin Das	Bangladesh	United States	Bengali Writer, Activist	Exiled in 2016 for speaking out against Islamic fundamentalism. Granted Asylum in the United States.
2022	Rafael Correa	Ecuador	Belgium	Former President of Ecuador	In 2022, Ecuador's Court President began extradition request seeking the return of former President Rafael Correa, who lives in Belgium and in 2020 was sentenced in absentia to eight years in prison on bribery allegations. His extradition was refused and he was granted asylum in Belgium.
2024	Jorge Glas	Ecuador	Mexico	Former Vice President of Ecuador	Jorge Glas was granted political asylum by Mexico just hours before authorities in Ecuador raided their embassy and took Glas into custody. This event triggered a diplomatic crisis which was condemned by other countries in the Americas.
2024	Sheikh Hasina	Bangladesh	India	Former Prime Minister of Bangladesh	Hasina resigned and fled to India on 5 August 2024 following Bangladesh's July Revolution and was granted political asylum by the Indian government.
2025	Nadine Heredia	Peru	Brazil	Former First Lady of Peru	Heredia was granted political asylum by Brazil on April 15, 2025. She was allowed to leave the country, which she did the following day.
2025	Betssy Chávez	Peru	Mexico	Former Prime Minister of Peru	Chávez was granted political asylum by Mexico on November 3, 2025. The Peruvian government responded by severing relations.

== See also ==
- List of people who took refuge in a diplomatic mission
- American fugitives in Cuba
