= Alexander Barankov =

Belarusian blogger and police officer

Alexander Nikolaevich Barankov Аляксандр Баранкоў
- Born: 28 October 1981 (age 44); Minsk
- Occupation: policeman or army captain in Belarus before his exile in Ecuador
- Known for: claiming Belarus police corruption, political asylum in Ecuador, comparison with Julian Assange

Alexander Nikolaevich Barankov (Аляксандр Баранкоў, also Aliaksandr) is a Belarusian former policeman or army captain. Barankov made claims of corruption by Belarusian police, faces Belarusian charges of bribery and fraud, and was awarded political refugee status in Ecuador on the grounds of being persecuted in Belarus. Barankov was detained in Ecuador in 2010 and 2012 while Belarusian requests for his extradition were considered by the Ecuadorian National Court of Justice (CNJ). Both requests were rejected.

== Career ==
Prior to his exile in Ecuador starting in 2008 or July 2009, Alexander Barankov was a Belarusian policeman or army captain. He held a position of financial crimes investigator.

== Points of view ==
Barankov claims that while he was a policeman in Belarus, he found evidence of corruption in police agencies and commercial organisations. He attributes Belarusian court cases against him as a response to his claims. Barankov's claims were initially published in a blog. On 17 August 2012, Barankov said that he had "exposed a petroleum-smuggling ring involving senior officials of President Alexander Lukashenko's government, including relatives of the leader." He described his information as "explosive".

== Legal proceedings ==
In mid-2009, the State Security Committee of the Republic of Belarus (KGB) charged Barankov with the receipt of bribes and fraud. Barankov left Belarus in 2008, before the charges had been laid, according to Time, or in July 2009, after the two criminal cases had been filed, according to the United Democratic Forces of Belarus (UDF). Ecuadorean files related to the case state that Barankov allegedly "attempted to extort employees of Total Oil, demanding payments of up to $60,000 on at least eight occasions."

In November, he was accused by Belarusian authorities of treason.

=== Ecuador ===
In 2010, Belarus applied for the extradition of Barankov from Ecuador, requesting preventive detention. Barankov was detained from 1 June 2010 to 22 July 2010 on the grounds of having overstayed his visa. Interpol described Barankov's 2010 arrest as an example of the "international success" of its operations.

The 2010 extradition request was rejected by the National Court of Justice (CNJ) president Carlos Ramírez on 28 October 2011, citing procedural irregularities and lack of guarantees that Barankov would not undergo treatment that was cruel, inhuman or degrading. The ruling left open the possibility that Belarus could apply again.

Barankov was detained again on 7 June 2012, several weeks before a visit by the Belarusian president Alexander Lukashenko on 28 June. A court hearing was held on 21 June. Time stated that Barankov was detained after Lukashenko's visit. Barankov's partner, Mabel Andrade, described the second detention as a serious violation of the right to asylum, and stated that Barankov risks the death penalty if extradited. Late in July, Barankov carried out a hunger strike in protest against his possible loss of refugee status and extradition. The Inter-American Commission on Human Rights considered a request for precautionary measures that would "prevent irreparable harm". On 23 August, prior to the CNJ's decision, the Ecuadorian Deputy Foreign Minister Marco Albuja stated, "Ecuador will put the emphasis on not extraditing a citizen whose life is at risk, from facing the death penalty or life in prison". Extradition would have required approval by Ecuadorian President Rafael Correa, who stated that if the CNJ allowed the extradition, then he could refuse the extradition "as a last resort." He stated, "We reject any attack on human rights (or) political persecution".

On 29 August 2012, the CNJ stated that Barankov's refugee status was justified and rejected the Belarusian extradition request.

== Political asylum ==
Barankov was given political refugee status in Ecuador on 23 July 2010 on the grounds of being persecuted in Belarus "for his discovery of corruption of President Alexander Lukashenko". Barankov's refugee status was confirmed by the CNJ on 29 August 2012 in response to a Belarusian request for his extradition. Barankov's political refugee status and possible extradition from Ecuador was compared by The Guardian, Time and Associated Press to that of Julian Assange, who was given political refugee status by Ecuador in August 2012.

== See also ==
- Whistleblower
- List of people granted political asylum
