= Venezuelan labour law =

Venezuelan labour law is covered by the Ley Orgánica del Trabajo, los Trabajadores y las Trabajadoras (2012), and underpinned by parts of the Constitution of Venezuela which cover labour rights.

== History ==
The first Venezuelan labour law, the Ley del Trabajo, was enacted on 23 July 1928, and the second on 16 July 1936. This second Ley del Trabajo was amended repeatedly (1945, 1947, 1966, 1974, 1975 and 1983) before being replaced in 1991 by the Ley Orgánica del Trabajo of 1 May 1991. This was reformed on 19 June 1997.
