= Rosmit Mantilla =

Venezuelan politician

Alternate Deputy of the National Assembly of Venezuela
- In office 5 January 2016 – 5 January 2021
- Constituency: Táchira

Personal details
- Born: 13 December 1982 (age 43) Petare, Miranda, Venezuela
- Party: Popular Will (until 2020); Civic Encounter (since 2020)
- Occupation: Activist

Rosmit Mantilla (born 13 December 1982) is a Venezuelan politician, who was elected to the National Assembly of Venezuela in the 2015 Venezuelan parliamentary election. He is noted as the first openly gay politician ever elected to the National Assembly.

== Detention ==
He is a member of the Voluntad Popular party. An LGBT rights activist, Mantilla was arrested in May 2014 during the 2014–15 Venezuelan protests against the government of Nicolás Maduro. He was detained at El Helicoide.

He was declared a prisoner of conscience by Amnesty International, which lobbied for his release. Along with Renzo Prieto and Gilberto Sojo, he was one of three people elected to the National Assembly in the 2015 election who were still in jail on election day due to charges stemming from the 2014 protests.

On November 11, 2016, it was reported that he was transferred to the Military Hospital because of a delicate health condition. A few months earlier it had been reported he had gallstones and was very ill. On November 15, 2016, his mother, Ingrid Flores, reported he had been transferred once again but this time to the Urólogico San Román to treat a stomach infection that was affecting his pancreas. On November 17, 2016, he was finally released after two and a half years in prison. In an interview with the digital site Panorama he said he would take a few days off to be with his family and was quoted as saying, "I am filled with hope and my commitment to Venezuela is stronger than ever. I will continue to fight for human rights and to achieve freedom for Venezuela and other prisoners of conscience. This is why I want to thank those that helped me be here today".

In 2020, he left Popular Will citing differences with the party's leadership. He has been a member of the centre-right Encuentro Ciudadano party since then.

== See also ==
- LGBT rights in Venezuela
- List of the first LGBT holders of political offices
- List of people granted asylum
- Political prisoners in Venezuela
