= Caracas Pride =

Annual LGBTQ event in Caracas, Venezuela

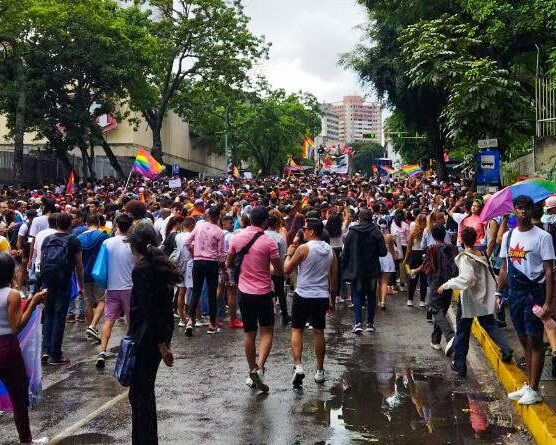
- The Caracas Pride March in 2022.
- Frequency: Annually
- Location: Caracas
- Country: Venezuela
- Years active: 2001-present

Caracas Pride, also known as the Caracas LGBTQ+ Pride March, is a Pride event held annually since 2001 in Caracas, the capital of Venezuela, to demand equal rights for the country's LGBT communities.

== History ==
The first Caracas Pride March took place on June 29, 1997, at Sabana Grande. It was organized by the Movimiento Ambiente de Venezuela (Venezuelan Environmental Movement, also known as MAV).

The first march, called Gay Pride, was organized in June 2001 by the GLBT Network, a group of organizations created in March of that year and consisted of the Lambda Alliance of Venezuela, Amazonas of Venezuela, Church of the Metropolitan Community of Venezuela, Citizen Action against AIDS, the Venezuelan Network of Positive People RGV+, the Wills Wilde Society, and Affirmative Union of Venezuela. The route of this first Pride Day celebration began at Plaza Brión in Chacaito and continued along Sabana Grande Boulevard to Plaza Morelos in Los Caobos.

Over the years, the march has changed its route. In 2022, the event began with a rally at Francisco de Miranda Park, where more than 20,000 people from the Venezuelan LGBTQ+ community attended under the slogan "No more, no less, the same rights."
