= Recognition of same-sex unions in Venezuela =

Venezuela does not recognize same-sex unions. In 2008, the Supreme Tribunal of Justice ruled that the Constitution of Venezuela does not prohibit or require the recognition of same-sex marriage. A lawsuit seeking to legalise same-sex marriage in Venezuela was filed with the Supreme Tribunal in January 2015. The court announced in April 2016 that it would hear oral arguments in the case, though no decision has yet been issued. On 24 February 2022, a deputy of the opposition Cambiemos Movimiento Ciudadano party introduced a same-sex marriage bill to the National Assembly.

== Civil unions ==
On July 14, 2006, a dual Venezuelan-English same-sex couple entered into a civil partnership at the British embassy in Caracas, in what the media described as the "first homosexual civil union" in Venezuela. The partnership was performed under British law and lacks legal recognition in Venezuela.

On 20 March 2009, Deputy Romelia Matute from the ruling United Socialist Party of Venezuela introduced an amendment to a bill on gender equality to legalize same-sex civil unions under the name "association by cohabitation" (asociación de convivencia). However, later that same month, Marelys Pérez, the chair of the Family, Women and Youth Commission, denied that such language was being considered as part of the gender equality bill. She added that although the Commission would debate the same-sex partnership initiative, it would be excluded from the current bill and likely wait for inclusion in a future civil code reform or update to anti-discrimination measures. The changes to the law were postponed multiple times. In June 2016, the Democratic Unity Roundtable announced it would work on a civil union bill granting same-sex couples many of the rights and benefits of marriage. The draft stalled and did not receive a reading in the National Assembly.

== Same-sex marriage ==
=== Legislative proposals ===
Recognition of same-sex unions in South America Marriage Other type of partnership Unrecognized Constitution limits marriage to opposite-sex couples Same-sex sexual activity illegal, though penalties not enforced

On 31 January 2014, during a debate on a civil code reform bill, the Civil Association Equality Venezuela (ACVI; Asociación Civil Venezuela Igualitaria) submitted a measure to legalize same-sex marriage to the National Assembly. The proposal was accompanied with 21,000 signatures and supported by the state governments of Barinas, Falcón, Mérida, Monagas, Táchira, Yaracuy and Zulia. The measure sought to modify article 44 of the Civil Code to legalize same-sex marriages in Venezuela. Elvis Amoroso, the president of the Internal Policy Commission, said that any discussion on the bill was unlikely to occur in 2014. The proposal was opposed by religious groups, including the Episcopal Conference of Venezuela, which stated that "God created marriage as between a man and a woman", while also arguing that churches "should defend and promote the dignity of every human being". Spokespeople for the ACVI responded that Venezuela was a secular state and that the measure would not compel religious denominations to perform same-sex marriages. As with the civil union bills, the legislation stalled and was not voted on by the Assembly.

In November 2017, President Nicolás Maduro said: "I think everyone should be able to get married, even if they're homosexual", adding that the Constituent Assembly would agree to discuss the legalization of same-sex marriage. In September 2018, Hermann Escarrá, a member of the Constituent Assembly, said there were active discussions on including provisions recognizing same-sex marriage in a new draft constitution, and suggested that the move had majority support in the Assembly. Discussions on a new constitution were expected to begin at the end of 2018 or early 2019, though this was postponed due to the presidential crisis. On 24 February 2022, Vanessa Robertazzo, a deputy of the opposition Cambiemos Movimiento Ciudadano party, introduced a same-sex marriage bill to the National Assembly.

In February 2022, Mayor Ernesto Paraquima of the Simón Rodríguez Municipality in Anzoátegui announced that the municipality would perform same-sex marriages. Article 4 of a municipal decree issued by Paraquima "order[s] the celebration and registration of marriages without discrimination based on race, sex, creed, social status, nationality, sexual orientation, gender identity, and gender expression." Paraquima said the marriages were private contracts granting same-sex couples some legal rights and responsibilities. "If the State does not want to become involved due to registration and notarization, then we will endorse it and do it as a private document. That would also work and we would be the first," said Paraquima. The marriages have no legal standing, as the definition of marriage is a federal matter under Venezuelan law, and are entirely symbolic. The cost to register is $400, which was criticised by activists as unaffordable in light of the hyperinflation in Venezuela. The first three marriage contracts for same-sex couples were issued on 8 March 2022.

=== Court cases ===
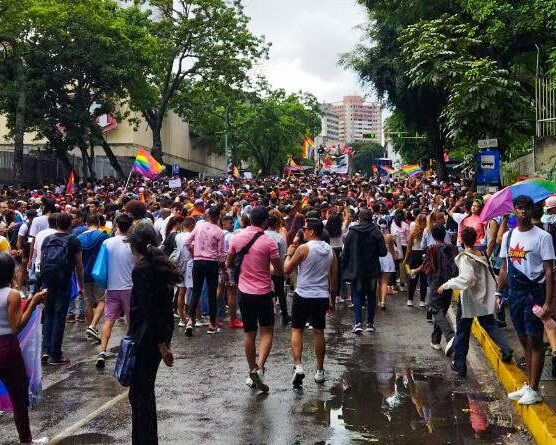
Protest in favor of LGBT rights and same-sex marriage in Caracas, June 2022

==== Early lawsuits ====
Article 77 of the Constitution of Venezuela, adopted in 1999, states that "marriage between a man and a woman is protected". It was unclear if the wording explicitly outlawed same-sex marriage. In February 2008, the Supreme Tribunal of Justice ruled in favor of Affirmative Union (Unión Afirmativa), a group advocating for same-sex marriage, who had requested clarification on the wording. The group had argued that the sentence was unclear and did not prevent same-sex couples from enjoying economic and social rights, including property rights in case of separation or death, alimony, adoption rights, social security benefits, protection from domestic violence or the possibility to acquire the nationality of a partner. The court ruled that the National Assembly "could", but was not bound to, legislate in order to protect such rights for same-sex partners. The court ruled that Article 77 does not prohibit same-sex civil unions or marriages, but also does not require their recognition. Article 77 of the Constitution states that:

Marriage between a man a woman, which is based on free consent and absolute equality of rights and obligations of the spouses, is protected. A stable de facto union between a man and a woman which meets the requirements established by law shall have the same effects as marriage. (Note: In some languages of Venezuela: Spanish: Se protege el matrimonio entre un hombre y una mujer, fundado en el libre consentimiento y en la igualdad absoluta de los derechos y deberes de los cónyuges. Las uniones estables de hecho entre un hombre y una mujer que cumplan los requisitos establecidos en la ley producirán los mismos efectos que el matrimonio.; Wayuu: Aa'inmajünajatü sukua'ipa tü kawayuusekaa süka sukua'ipa alijuna, jee müsüja'a shia achekalaainjatü sukua'ipa sümaa wanaawaa aa'in süpüla tü naa'inrajatükaa wayuu napüshua'a ka'wayuuseren. Eere wanee ka'wayuusee anashaanain sukua'ipa laülaain aa'in kajutsüya'asa.)

On 15 August 2016, a Venezuelan citizen and his American husband, Carlos and Patrick Holder Wendell, filed a lawsuit in the U.S. District Court of Massachusetts challenging the Venezuelan Government's refusal to recognize their legal marriage after multiple petitions to the Venezuelan consulate in Boston. Their lawsuit alleged that the refusal to recognize their marriage violated the Venezuelan Constitution, the Civil Code and the Vienna Convention on Consular Relations, a treaty to which both the United States and Venezuela are parties. Judge Indira Talwani dismissed the case in May 2017, holding that U.S. courts lacked standing to rule on the policies and laws of foreign states.

==== Supreme Tribunal case ====
In January 2015, a lawsuit challenging the constitutionality of article 44 of the Civil Code, which states that marriage is only legally valid between "a man and a woman", was filed with the Supreme Tribunal of Justice. On 28 April 2016, the court announced it would hear oral arguments. On 9 January 2018, the Inter-American Court of Human Rights (IACHR) issued an advisory opinion that parties to the American Convention on Human Rights should grant same-sex couples "accession to all existing domestic legal systems of family registration, including marriage, along with all rights that derive from marriage". The advisory opinion states that:

The State must recognize and guarantee all rights derived from a family bond between persons of the same sex in accordance with the provisions of Articles 11.2 and 17.1 of the American Convention. (...) in accordance with articles 1.1, 2, 11.2, 17, and 24 of the American Convention, it is necessary to guarantee access to all the existing figures in domestic legal systems, including the right to marry. (..) To ensure the protection of all the rights of families formed by same-sex couples, without discrimination with respect to those that are constituted by heterosexual couples.

Venezuela ratified the American Convention on Human Rights on 9 August 1977 and recognized the court's jurisdiction on 24 June 1981. Venezuela under President Hugo Chávez withdrew from the Convention in 2013. In May 2019, the National Assembly controlled by the Venezuelan opposition and recognizing Juan Guaidó as president nullified the withdrawal.

In January 2022, activists protested in front of the Supreme Tribunal building in Caracas, criticising the seven years of inaction by the court. More demonstrations occurred in October 2026.

=== Native Venezuelans ===
While many Indigenous cultures historically practiced polygamy, there are no records of same-sex marriages being performed in these cultures in the way they are commonly defined in Western legal systems. However, many Indigenous communities recognize identities and relationships that may be placed on the LGBT spectrum. Among these are two-spirit individuals—people who embody both masculine and feminine qualities. In some cultures, two-spirit individuals assigned male at birth wear women's clothing and engage in household and artistic work associated with the feminine sphere. Historically, this identity sometimes allowed for unions between two people of the same biological sex. The Warao, who inhabit the Orinoco Delta region, refer to them as tida wena. They tend to the home, cook and care for children and elders, and participate in the harvest of important crops. Historically, they were sometimes the second or third wives of polygamous men. They also occasionally performed the role of a shaman. Though traditionally integrated and respected within their communities, encroaching social norms have caused the tida wena to experience discrimination today, "threatening the relative well-being that [they] have enjoyed for centuries".

=== Religious performance ===
The Catholic Church, the largest Christian denomination in Venezuela, opposes same-sex marriage and does not allow its priests to officiate at such marriages. In 2006, the Archbishop of Maracaibo, Ubaldo Ramón Santana Sequera, released a statement calling for respect for the "moral patrimony" of marriage, urging lawmakers to reject legislation recognizing same-sex unions. He added, "Whether or not a law is passed in Venezuela, we are going to pay attention. And not only do the bishops need to be heard on this; the voice of the people needs to be heard. We don't think this is something that should be thrown overboard just because a few lawmakers decide to approve this type of law." The Episcopal Conference of Venezuela reiterated its opposition in 2014 when debate on legislation to legalize same-sex marriage was ongoing in the National Assembly. In December 2023, the Holy See published Fiducia supplicans, a declaration allowing Catholic priests to bless couples who are not considered to be married according to church teaching, including the blessing of same-sex couples.

Evangelical groups are also firmly opposed to same-sex marriage. On the other hand, the Metropolitan Community Church in Caracas supports and solemnises same-sex marriages.

== Public opinion ==
According to a Pew Research Center survey conducted between November 8, 2013 and February 12, 2014, 28% of Venezuelans supported same-sex marriage, while 61% were opposed. The 2014 AmericasBarometer published in June 2015 showed that 30% of Venezuelans were in favour of same-sex marriage, whereas the 2017 AmericasBarometer showed that support had increased to 39%.

A 2023 poll by the Equilibrium – Center for Economic Development (Equilibrium CenDE) found that 55% of Venezuelans supported same-sex marriage (41% "totally" and 14% "somewhat"), while 32% opposed it (25% "totally" and 7% "somewhat"). 48% of respondents also supported adoption by same-sex couples (34% "totally" and 14% "somewhat"), while 39% were opposed (28% "totally" and 11% "somewhat"). The 2023 Latinobarómetro estimated that support for same-sex marriage stood at 30%, while 69% were opposed and 1% were undecided or had refused to answer.

== See also ==
- LGBTQ rights in Venezuela
- Recognition of same-sex unions in the Americas
