= LGBTQ rights in Venezuela =

- Venezuela
- Legal status: Legal since 1997
- Gender identity: No
- Military: Legal (since 2023) (see below)

Family rights
- Recognition of relationships: No recognition of same-sex unions
- Restrictions: Same-sex marriage and de facto union constitutionally illegal, proposed
- Adoption: Single parent adoption legal, joint parent adoption illegal

Lesbian, gay, bisexual, transgender and queer (LGBTQ) people in Venezuela face legal challenges not experienced by non-LGBTQ residents. Both male and female types of same-sex sexual activity are legal in Venezuela, but same-sex couples and households headed by same-sex couples are not eligible for the same legal protections available to opposite-sex married couples. Also, same-sex marriage and de facto unions have been constitutionally banned since 1999.

== Legality of same-sex sexual activity ==
Homosexuality has never been punishable since Venezuelan independence, Venezuela being together with Bolivia the only two countries in South America that have not criminalized homosexuality since their formation as sovereign states. However, within the framework of the "law on lazy people and thugs" (pre-criminal behavior laws as in Europe and Latin America during the 20th century) the situation changed slightly; In Venezuela, unlike Spain, this law did not expressly refer to homosexuals, although it was occasionally applied to homosexuals, transgender and/or transsexuals who practiced prostitution, as well as to sex workers in general, as reported by Amnesty International. People subjected to this legislation by "administrative acts" could be placed under "reeducation programs" in "special places of confinement" without trial, as has also happened in many other countries, including Spain. This law was declared unconstitutional by the Supreme Court of Justice in 1997.

The universal age of consent is equal at 16.

== Recognition of same-sex relationships ==
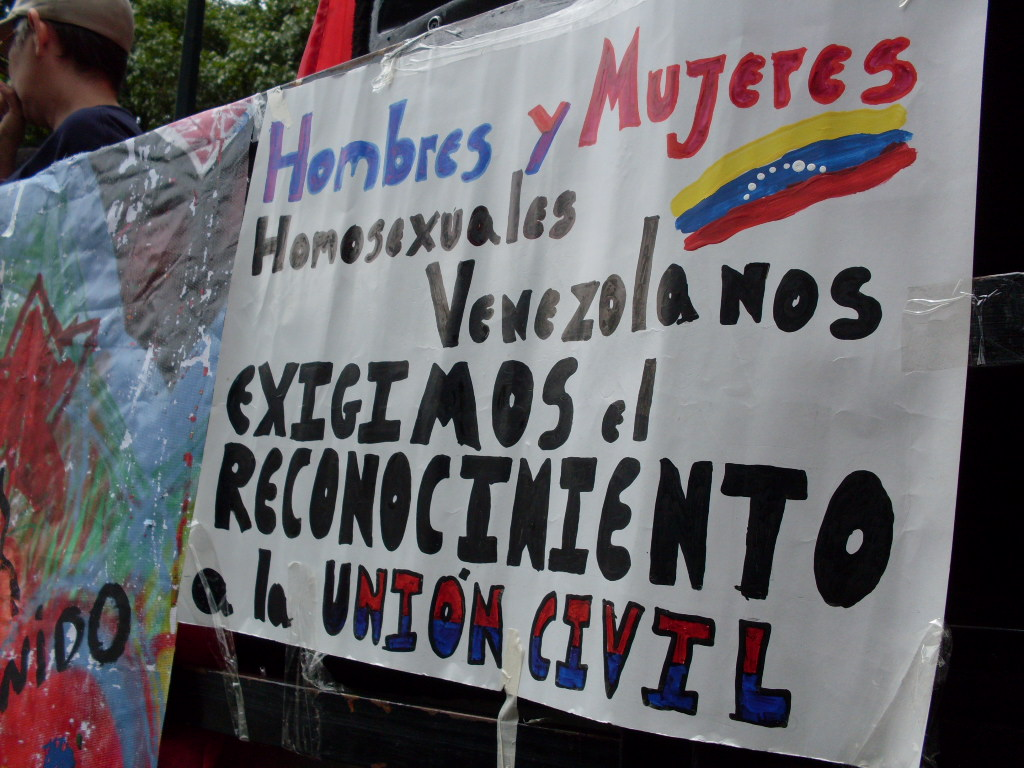
Poster demanding same-sex union recognition in Venezuela.

The Constitution of Venezuela, adopted in 1999, defines marriage as a union between a man and a woman, thus constitutionally banning same-sex marriage. Article 77 of the Constitution reads as follows:

Marriage between a man a woman, which is based on free consent and absolute equality of rights and obligations of the spouses, is protected. A stable de facto union between a man and a woman which meets the requirements established by law shall have the same effects as marriage.

Also, there is no legal recognition of same-sex couples explicitly in Venezuelan law.

In 2003, an LGBT NGO called Unión Afirmativa (Affirmative Union) submitted an appeal to the Supreme Court for legal recognition of economic rights (pensions, inheritance, social security, common household, etc.) for same-sex partners. The ruling, issued on 28 February 2008 despite recognizing that "same sex partners enjoy all of the rights, civil, political, economic, social and cultural rights- they do not have special protection similar to concubinage or marriage between a man and a woman, that is, in the same terms than heterosexual partners have. Notwithstanding this, the National Assembly is the government body with the mandate to legislate to protect such rights for same-sex partners." The decision also indicated that these rights were covered under the Constitution of the Bolivarian Republic of Venezuela.

On 20 March 2009, Chamber of Deputies member Romelia Matute announced that the National Assembly would explicitly legalize same-sex unions and recognize them as asociaciones de convivencia (association by cohabitation) as part of the Gender and Equity Organic Law. This initiative was never discussed. Further other initiatives concerning this subject and recognition of identity of transgender people were submitted by the civil society to the National Assembly, but no formal discussion has ever taken place.

On 31 January 2014, during a debate on a civil code reform bill, LGBT activists submitted a proposal seeking to legalize same-sex marriage.

In January 2015, a lawsuit for the right to marry was filed before the country's Supreme Court. On 28 April 2016, the Supreme Court announced it would hear the case. The lawsuit sought to declare Article 44 of the Civil Code unconstitutional because it stated that marriage was only legally valid between a man and a woman in Venezuela.

In June 2016, Venezuela's opposition announced that it would work on a civil union bill. A prominent committee member said that the new Registry Law would allow couples to seek some benefits.

In November 2017, President Nicolás Maduro expressed his personal support for same-sex marriage, and said that the Constituent Assembly would agree to discuss legalising same-sex marriage. In September 2018, Hermann Escarrá, a member of the Constituent Assembly, said that there are currently discussions to allow same-sex marriage under the new Constitution of Venezuela, and that there is majority support in the Assembly. Discussion on the new Constitution was expected to begin at the end of 2018 or early 2019, but has been postponed since then.

== Adoption and parenting ==
Same-sex couples in Venezuela are unable to legally adopt children. However, lesbian couples are allowed to access IVF.

On 15 December 2016, the Supreme Tribunal of Justice ruled that a baby boy can be registered in the Venezuelan Civil Registry with the surnames of both his mothers. Basing its ruling on Article 75 of the Constitution, the court declared that the state shall provide protection without distinction to all families, including to children and teenagers born into same-sex families. Additionally, such children must enjoy all the rights and guarantees enshrined to other children born into opposite-sex families. From now on, children with same-sex parents in Venezuela may be registered with the surnames of both their parents, regardless of whether the parents are biological or not.

== Discrimination protections ==
In Venezuela, few legal instruments, in some specific areas (workplace, rental housing, and banking system), protect LGBT people from discrimination. However, even when protections do exist these laws lack mechanisms to implement real and effective strategies to prevent discrimination and inequality.

Since 2012, the Organic Labor Law, prohibits discrimination based on sexual orientation. Previously, discrimination in labor on the basis of "sexual option" was outlawed in 1996.

Article 4 of the Organic Law of the People's Power (2010), states that "The Popular Power is designed to ensure the life and welfare of the people, by creating mechanisms for their social and spiritual development, ensuring equal conditions for everyone freely develop their personality, direct their destination, enjoy human rights and attain the supreme social happiness; without discrimination on grounds of ethnic origin, religion, social status, sex, sexual orientation, gender identity and expression, language, political opinion, national origin, age, economic status, disability or any other personal, legal or social circumstance which has the effect of nullifying or impairing the recognition, enjoyment or exercise of human rights and constitutional guarantees."

Article 173 of the Law for Banking Sector Institutions (2010), includes "gender identity or expression" as protected categories against discrimination.

Article 5 of the Law for the Regulation and Control of Housing Leasing, enacted in 2011, bans discrimination and provides protection to those who are especially vulnerable, or vulnerable to discrimination on the basis of sexual orientation and gender identity, among others.

In the process leading up to the adoption of the new 1999 Venezuelan Constitution, anti-discrimination provisions were proposed; however, due to forceful opposition from the Roman Catholic Church, they were dropped from the final draft. In 2001, there were renewed attempts to include them in the Constitution. In 2002, then-President Hugo Chávez voiced his regret for their exclusion, signaling that they may be included in future rounds of constitutional reform.

The Venezuelan constitutional referendum in 2007 would have outlawed discrimination based on sexual orientation but both of the two reform packages, which covered a wide range of social and economic measures, were narrowly defeated.

Many LGBT groups have proposed to the National Assembly to legislate on equality since 2009 to 2015, the proposed anti-discrimination laws have never been considered in the agenda.

== Gender identity and expression ==
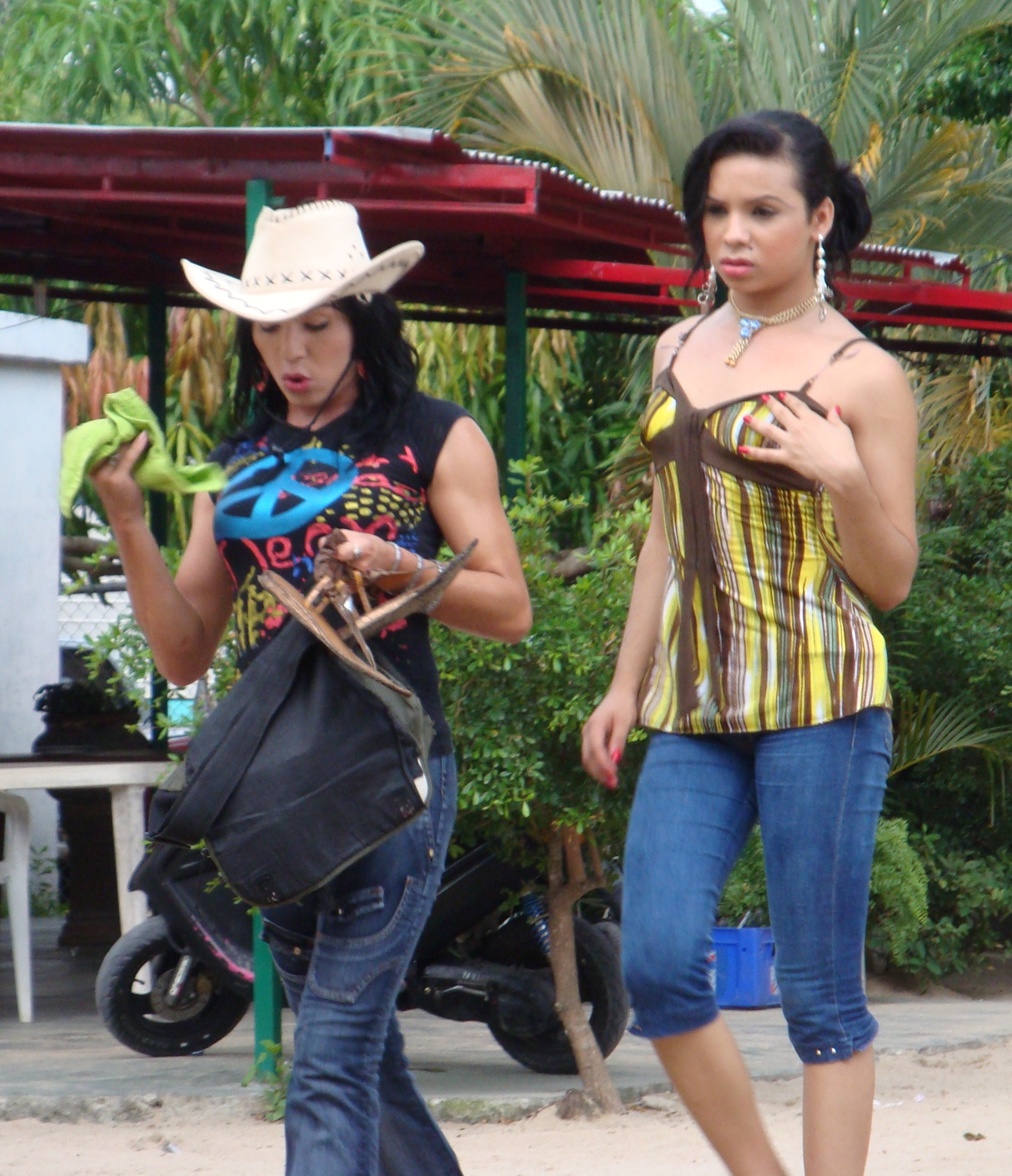
Transgender women in Bobure beach, state of Zulia

In September 2016, the Administrative Service of Identification and Migration Affairs (SAIME), through a petition by the Public Ministry, announced that transgender people may request a new identity card according to their gender identity. The photograph on the identity card will be adequate to the gender that manifests the person, regardless of biological sex. However, there's currently no administrative procedure or mechanism to enact article °146, leaving trans people still unable to change their information on their identity card.

In 2017, Venezuela's Supreme Justice Tribunal admitted a constitutional action that intends to allow changing the name and gender of a group of people. Each case will be individually assessed, and all parties involved will need a certified copy of birth certificates and a psychiatric and psychological report submitted by a specialist that demonstrates the veracity of the intended sexual identity. However, the Tribunal still has not granted the change of name and gender to the people involved in the constitutional action.

== Military service ==
LGBT people can serve openly in the military since a 16 March 2023 ruling by the Supreme Court of Justice annulled section 565 of the Military Justice Code, in force since 1998, which previously banned same-sex sexual activity. The court found that the law was unconstitutionally vague and that banning non-reproductive sex was incompatible with the Constitution and international agreements on human rights.

Article 565 stated "The official who commits acts that affront or debase their dignity or allow such acts without trying to stop it by means authorized by law, shall be punished with imprisonment of one to three years and separation of the Armed Forces. The same penalty shall apply to any military who commit sexual acts against nature."

Previously, a number of cases had been known where members of the military have been harassed or dismissed for being gay.

== Living conditions ==
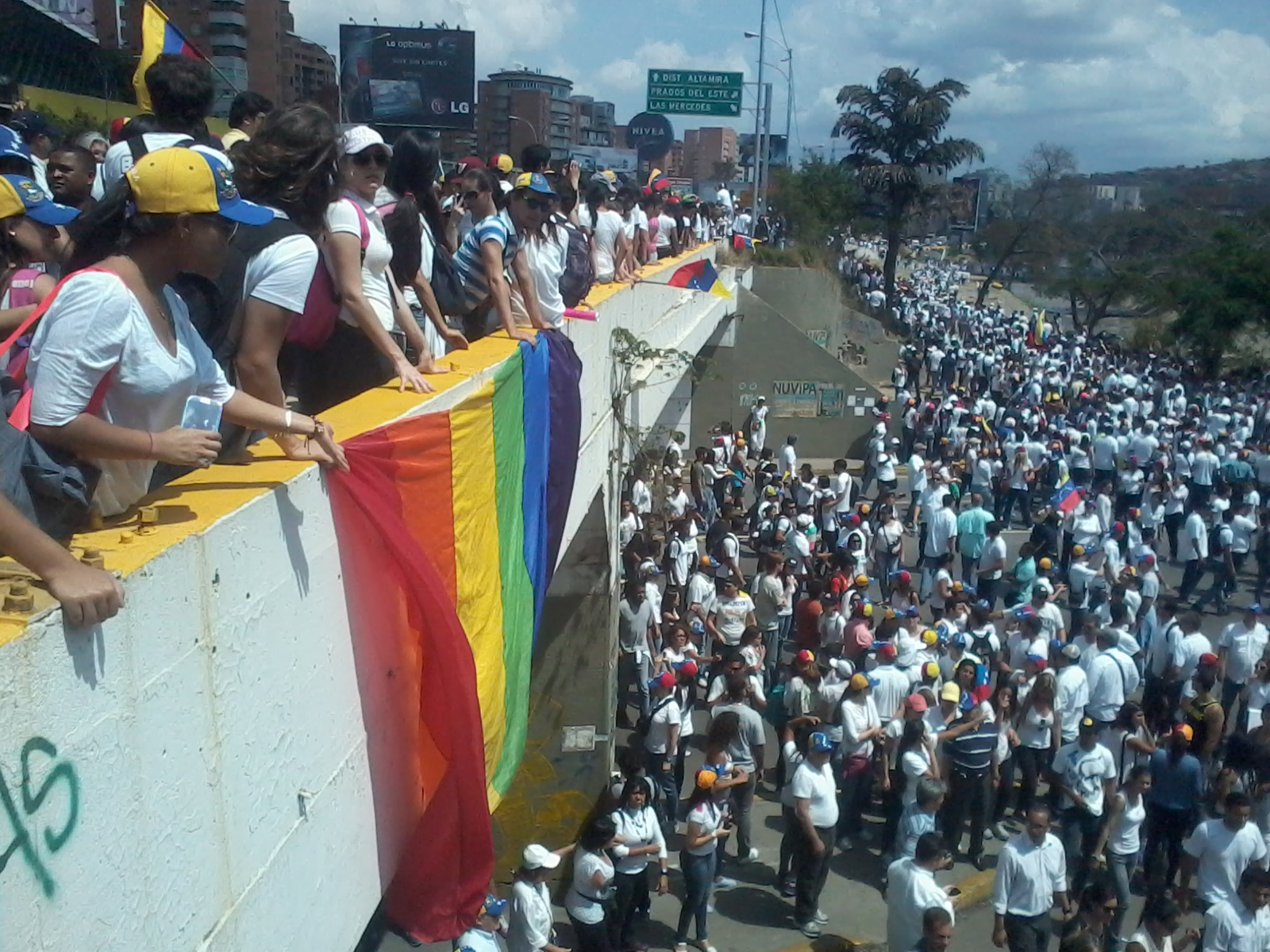
LGBT supporters at an anti-government march in 2014 shortly after the arrest of Leopoldo López

Since 2000, the International Day Against Homophobia has been marked, while recently the government has begun participating in Pride events for the first time. However, police harassment and homophobia in the workplace remain serious problems.

During the 2015 parliamentary election, transgender activist Tamara Adrián was elected as Alternate Deputy to the National Assembly for the Popular Will party, becoming the second transgender member of a national legislature in Latin America, after Uruguay's Michelle Suárez Bértora. Adrián has stated in various occasions she intends to push forth legislation to legalize same-sex marriage and enhance the state's protection of LGBT people. Rosmit Mantilla, also an LGBT rights activist from Popular Will and openly gay, was elected as an Alternate Deputy in the 2015 election as well; the two are the first-ever LGBT members of Venezuela's Legislature.

In May 2016, the National Assembly unanimously approved a resolution establishing 17 May as the International Day Against Homophobia, Transphobia and Biphobia, in order to raise awareness in society and to promote the fight against discrimination, stigmatization, violence and denial of rights to individuals on the basis of their sexual orientation or their gender identity or expression. In August 2016, however, the Supreme Court suspended the resolution.

In May 2026, Venezuelan human rights organizations denounced the detention of around 30 people following a police raid on an LGBTQ+ entertainment venue in Barquisimeto, Lara state. According to NGOs including the Observatorio Venezolano de Violencias LGBTIQ+, Caleidoscopio Humano and Movimiento SOMOS, officers allegedly entered the establishment without proper warrants, carried out acts of extortion, and accused detainees of “committing the crime of homosexuality”, despite homosexuality being legal in Venezuela. The incident sparked renewed criticism from activists, who argued that arbitrary police harassment and discrimination against LGBTQ+ people continue despite existing constitutional and labor protections.

== Public opinion ==
According to a Pew Research Center survey, conducted between 8 November 2013 and 12 February 2014, 28% of Venezuelans supported same-sex marriage, 61% were opposed.

A 2013 Pew Research Center opinion survey showed that 51% of Venezuelans believe homosexuality should be accepted by society, while 42% believe it should not. 57% of people between 18 and 29 believe it should be accepted, 51% of people between 30 and 49 and 45% of people over 50.

In May 2015, PlanetRomeo, an LGBT social network, published its first Gay Happiness Index (GHI). Gay men from over 120 countries were asked about how they feel about society's view on homosexuality, how do they experience the way they are treated by other people and how satisfied are they with their lives. Venezuela was ranked 45th, just above Suriname and below Ecuador, with a GHI score of 48.

A 2023 poll by the Equilibrium – Center for Economic Development (Equilibrium CenDE) found that 55% of Venezuelans supported same-sex marriage (41% "totally" and 14% "somewhat"), while 32% opposed it (25% "totally" and 7% "somewhat"). 48% of respondents also supported adoption by same-sex couples (34% "totally" and 14% "somewhat"), while 39% were opposed (28% "totally" and 11% "somewhat").

== Summary table ==
Flag of the LGBT community of Venezuela

Same-sex sexual activity legal	Yes (Since 1997)
Equal age of consent (16)	Yes (Since 1997)
Anti-discrimination laws in employment only	Yes (Since 1996 based on "sexual option", since 2012 based on sexual orientation)
Anti-discrimination laws in the provision of goods and services	Yes (Since 1996 based on "sexual option", since 2012 based on sexual orientation)
Anti-discrimination laws in all other areas (incl. indirect discrimination, hate speech)	No / Yes (In the state of Mérida only)
Same-sex marriages	No (Proposed)
Recognition of same-sex couples	No (Proposed)
Adoption by single LGBT persons	Yes
Stepchild adoption by same-sex couples	No
Joint adoption by same-sex couples	No
Automatic parenthood on birth certificates for children of same-sex couples	Yes (Since 2016)
LGBT people allowed to serve openly in the military	Yes (Since 2023)
Right to change legal gender	No
Access to IVF for lesbians	Yes
Conversion therapy banned on minors	No
Commercial surrogacy for gay male couples	No
MSMs allowed to donate blood	No

== See also ==
- Human rights in Venezuela
- LGBTQ rights in the Americas
- Recognition of same-sex unions in Venezuela
- Same-sex union court cases
