= Recognition of same-sex unions in Mozambique =

Mozambique does not recognize same-sex marriages or civil unions. The Family Code of Mozambique recognizes de facto unions but only for opposite-sex couples and bans same-sex marriage. Some protests for the legal recognition of same-sex marriage occurred in 2006, as discussions on this issue were ongoing in South Africa.

== Legal history ==
=== Developments in 2006 ===
In July 2006, a few months before same-sex marriage was legalised in neighbouring South Africa, the Agência de Informação de Moçambique newspaper reported that a group of gay men in Maputo would petition the Assembly of the Republic to legalise same-sex marriage. In October 2006, human rights activist Alice Mabota urged Mozambique's gay and lesbian citizens "to organise and fight for their rights", but added that her organisation, the Mozambique Human Rights League, would not campaign on specific issues such as the legalisation of same-sex marriage. "It would be gay people themselves who should raise such a demand, if they wanted to marry", Mabota said. Activist Danilo de Sousa stated at the time "that few Mozambican gays are open about their sexuality. Many lead a semi-open (or semi-closed) life, while the majority keep their sexual orientation completely clandestine, or even deny it. One often finds homosexuals married to members of the opposite sex, merely to please their family and society." Activist Danilo da Silva, founder of the LGBT advocacy group Lambda, also said that "Mozambican gays should concentrate on removing any clause from the country's laws that might be used to criminalise gays, and to introduce measures that ban discrimination on the base of sexual orientation." Silva did not call for the legalisation of same-sex marriage but rather suggested a "gradual recognition of the rights of gay partners living in de facto unions".

While same-sex marriage remains illegal, Mozambique has made significant strides on LGBT rights. Reforms to the employment law were passed in 2007 forbidding employment discrimination on the basis of sexual orientation, and in 2015 the Criminal Code was amended to remove vague references to "practices against nature", which were interpreted as banning same-sex sexual relations. Nevertheless, LGBT people still face discrimination and violence, and laws do not permit or recognise same-sex marriages or civil unions.

=== Restrictions ===
Same-sex sexual activity legal Same-sex marriage Limited recognition (foreign residency rights) No recognition of same-sex couples Same-sex sexual activity illegal Prison but not enforced Prison Death penalty on books but not enforced Enforced death penalty

Article 8 of the Family Code of Mozambique, passed by the Assembly of the Republic in 2019 and published in the Boletim da República on 11 December 2019, defines marriage as the "voluntary and singular union between a man and a woman, for the purpose of starting a family, through a full communion of life". (Note: Portuguese: O casamento é a união voluntária e singular entre um homem e uma mulher, com o propósito de constituir família, mediante comunhão plena de vida.) The Code further defines the family as "the fundamental element and the basis of every society", and article 2 states that the "singular, stable, free and notorious union between a man and a woman is recognized as a family entity". As a result, same-sex couples are unable to marry in Mozambique. The Family Code also introduced de facto unions (Portuguese: união de facto, pronounced [uˈnjɐ̃w̃ dɨ ˈfaktu]) for opposite-sex couples after three years of continuous cohabitation. A de facto union is defined in the Family Code as a "singular connection existing between a man and a woman, with a stable and lasting character" between partners who are legally capable of marrying but have chosen not to.

The Constitution of Mozambique does not explicitly address same-sex marriages, but Article 119, which defines the family as "the fundamental unit and the basis of society", states that:

The State shall, in accordance with the law, recognise and protect marriage as the institution that secures the pursuit of family objectives. (Note: In some official and indigenous languages of Mozambique: Portuguese: O Estado reconhece e protege, nos termos da lei, o casamento como instituição que garante a prossecução dos objectivos da família.; Makhuwa: Epooma ennaakhulela ni onnikhapelela, ntoko silamuliwaaya, othelaniwa okhalaka mwiiraano onlipiherya orowiha ohoolo sootthuneya sa amusi.; Tsonga: Mfumu wuyamukela ni kusirhelela, hi kulandza nawu, vukati tani nhlanganu lowutiyisisaka kulandziwa ka minkongometo ya njangu.)

== Historical and customary recognition ==
While many modern-day Mozambican cultures historically practiced polygamy, there are no records of same-sex marriages being performed in local cultures in the way they are commonly defined in Western legal systems. However, there is evidence for identities and behaviours that may be placed on the LGBT spectrum. Contemporary oral evidence suggests that same-sex relationships were "common" and "prevalent" among Tsonga miners in South Africa and southern Mozambique in the early 20th century. In 1912, Swiss-born missionary Henri-Alexandre Junod described "elaborately organized homosexual relationships among miners". The younger partner, known as nkhonsthana in the Tsonga language, was "used to satisfy the lust" of the older partner (nima). "He received a wedding feast, and his elder brother received a bride price." Junod described a dance in which the nkhonsthana donned wooden or cloth breasts, which they removed when paid to do so by their nima. A Tsonga local told Junod at the time: "Each of these nima would propose a boy for himself, not only for the sake of washing his dishes, because in the evening the boy would have to go and join [him] on his bed. In that way he had become a wife. The husband would make love with him. The husband would penetrate his manhood between the boy's thighs. Fidelity was expected, and jealousy on occasion led to violence." He added that male couples "would quarrel just as husbands and wives do", and when asked whether the nkhonsthana wished to become someone's partner, he replied, "Yes, for the sake of security, for the acquisition of property and for the fun itself."

These "mine marriages", which also occurred among miners in South Africa and Zimbabwe, were "accepted, indeed taken for granted by women (including wives) and elders at home, and relationships might extend beyond a single work contract". However, these relationships differed strongly from the Western understanding of same-sex marriages, as men who entered these "mine marriages" continued to marry women and "conform, or appear to conform, to gender expectations", and would not consider themselves as homosexual or bisexual, or "unfaithful to [their] marriage vows". This practice gradually disappeared as Mozambique became more modernized and exposed to Western culture and homophobia in the 20th century.

== Religious performance ==
The Catholic Church opposes same-sex marriage and does not allow its priests to officiate at such marriages. In December 2023, the Holy See published Fiducia supplicans, a declaration allowing Catholic priests to bless couples who are not considered to be married according to church teaching, including the blessing of same-sex couples. The Episcopal Conference of Mozambique issued a statement that "irregular unions and same-sex unions should not be blessed in Mozambique", but encouraged "all ordained ministers to show closeness and accompaniment to those living in irregular unions".

As the Anglican Church of Southern Africa was discussing the possibility of blessing same-sex unions, dioceses in Angola and Mozambique split to "form a more conservative Anglican province" in 2021. Known as the Anglican Church of Mozambique and Angola, it does not offer blessings to same-sex unions.

== Public opinion ==
A September 2013 Lambda Mozambique survey of people in the cities of Maputo, Beira and Nampula found moderate levels of support for the legal recognition of same-sex unions: 37% of Maputo residents, 18% of Beira residents and 28% of Nampula residents supported same-sex marriage. A Lambda 2017 survey found that support for same-sex marriage had increased in all three cities; 47% in Maputo, 38% in Beira and 42% in Nampula.

== See also ==
- LGBT rights in Mozambique
- Recognition of same-sex unions in Africa
- Same-sex marriage in South Africa
- Recognition of same-sex unions in Angola
