= Recognition of same-sex unions in Eswatini =

Eswatini does not recognise same-sex marriages or civil unions. The Marriage Act, 1964 does not provide for the recognition of same-sex unions.

== Legal history ==
=== Background ===
Same-sex sexual relations are outlawed in Eswatini under Roman-Dutch common law. Although the Minister of Justice has repeatedly stated that their policy is not to prosecute consenting adults, discrimination and abuse "severely impact the lives of LGBT people in [Eswatini]". In 2009, activists from the Eswatini AIDS Support Organisation reported that many LGBT people were forced into opposite-sex "marriages of convenience". "These people cheat on their spouses because they are not allowed to marry partners of the same sex", said Vusi Matsebula, a spokesperson for the organisation, who argued that "same-sex couples should be legally recognised and become involved in combating the disease."

In 2009, a lesbian couple, Pitseng Vilakati and Thuli Rudd, were publicly engaged in a ceremony held in Manzini. The couple quickly made headlines, attracting significant media coverage. There was a massive public reaction which was "largely hostile, insulting and deeply disrespectful".

=== Restrictions ===
Same-sex sexual activity legal Same-sex marriage Limited recognition (foreign residency rights) No recognition of same-sex couples Same-sex sexual activity illegal Prison but not enforced Prison Death penalty on books but not enforced Enforced death penalty

Eswatini law does not recognise same-sex marriages. The Marriage Act (Act 47 of 1964; Swazi: uMtsetfo weMshado) does not expressly forbid same-sex marriages and does not contain a definition of marriage. However, it generally refers to married spouses as "bridegroom" and "bride". The Constitution of Eswatini also does not explicitly address same-sex marriages. Article 27(1) of the Constitution states that "[m]en and women of marriageable age have a right to marry and found a family." Human rights attorney Sibusiso Nhlabatsi has argued that the article constitutionally bans same-sex marriage; however, the wording has not been challenged in court. Nhlabatsi has called on activists to challenge the laws, "Therefore, the LGBTI community should push for the amendment of the Constitution so that they are accommodated. After all the constitution guarantees the right to equality, the right to dignity and the freedom of choice or conscience." Article 27(2) of the Constitution further states that:

Marriage shall be entered into only with the free and full consent of the intending spouses. (Note: Swazi: Umshado uyangenelwa kuphela uma ngabe labobantfu bakhululekile kantsi futsi banemvume yabo lephelele yekushada lomuntfu labamshadako.)

Additionally, customary marriages are recognised through traditional unwritten Swazi law, allowing for polygamous marriages in Eswatini. Civil unions, which would offer some of the rights, benefits and obligations of marriage, are also not recognised in Eswatini. In May 2022, a spokesperson for the Communist Party of Swaziland, banned by King Mswati III in 2011 and headquartered in Mpumalanga, South Africa, criticised the government's opposition to LGBT rights. "The fact of the matter is that the Government is relying on colonial laws and colonial morality to deny the LGBTI community their fundamental rights. The laws still discriminate against all groups outside heterosexual relations, marriages of LGBTI people remain banned", the spokesperson said. They accused the government of "hiding the truth as the progressive Swazi society had long accepted the LGBTI community but it was Mswati's autocracy that was refusing to accept them as human beings." King Mswati III reiterated the government's opposition to same-sex marriage in April 2026, stating that "Eswatini's approach to marriage is guided by moral principles that have shaped Swati society for generations".

== Religious performance ==
The Anglican Church of Southern Africa, which has one diocese in Eswatini, does not permit same-sex marriages. Its marriage policies state that "holy matrimony is the lifelong and exclusive union between one man and one woman". In 2016, the synod voted against blessing same-sex unions. The decision split the Church, with several dioceses deciding to nonetheless proceed with the blessing of same-sex relationships, notably the Diocese of Saldanha Bay in South Africa. Archbishop Thabo Makgoba expressed disappointment with the decision not to bless same-sex unions, but added that "all is not lost", expressing hope that the matter would be debated again in the future. Former Archbishop Njongonkulu Ndungane also expressed his disappointment with the decision. In early 2023, the Church once again refused to allow its clergy to bless same-sex unions, but directed the synod to develop "guidelines for providing pastoral ministry to those in same-sex relationships". In May 2024, Archbishop Makgoba released a document recommending prayers for same-sex couples, which the synod rejected in September 2024. In September 2026, the Church again rejected a motion relating to a proposed "ministry of inclusion" for parishioners in same-sex relationships.

The Catholic Church, which has one diocese in Eswatini, opposes same-sex marriage and does not allow its priests to officiate at such marriages. In December 2023, the Holy See published Fiducia supplicans, a declaration allowing Catholic priests to bless couples who are not considered to be married according to church teaching, including the blessing of same-sex couples. The Southern African Catholic Bishops' Conference, representing bishops in Botswana, South Africa and Eswatini, released a statement saying that "the document offers suggestions for when and how the blessings might be given. The Southern African Catholic Bishops Conference will guide further on how such a blessing may be requested and granted to avoid the confusion the document warns against. In the meantime, the suggestions offered by the declaration may be taken as a guide with prudence." In 2015, the synod of the Evangelical Lutheran Church in Southern Africa discussed same-sex unions but concluded that "a marriage is understood as a union only between a man and a woman. Furthermore the valid and unchanged position of our Church is that the blessing of same sex unions is rejected." In 2020, the Methodist Church of Southern Africa voted to allow members, including ordained clergy, to enter into same-sex unions, while retaining the denomination's teaching that marriage is a union "between a man and a woman".

In 2015, the General Synod of the Dutch Reformed Church voted by a 64% majority to recognise same-sex marriages, bless the relationships of same-sex couples and allow gay ministers and clergy (who are not required to be celibate). The decision applies to 9 of the 10 synods; with the Namibia Synod being excluded, but it does apply to the Eastern Synod, which includes all of Eswatini. The decision caused backlash and objections, resulting in it being reversed a year later. A dozen church members subsequently took the denomination to court to restore the 2015 decision. In 2019, the North Gauteng High Court reversed the decision, ruling that while religious organizations have the freedom to define marriage the 2016 decision to ban same-sex marriage was not made in accordance with the church's proper process. A freedom of conscience clause allows pastors with objections to opt out of performing same-sex weddings, so that individual pastors are free to choose whether to bless same-sex marriages.

== Public opinion ==
A 2024 survey by The Other Foundation showed that approximately 20% of Swazi people supported same-sex marriage.

== See also ==
- LGBT rights in Eswatini
- Recognition of same-sex unions in Africa
- Same-sex marriage in South Africa
