= Recognition of same-sex unions in Zambia =

Zambia does not recognize same-sex marriages or civil unions. The Marriage Act does not provide for the recognition of same-sex unions.

== Legal history ==
=== Background ===
Same-sex sexual relations are outlawed in Zambia under a colonial-era law inherited when Zambia was a protectorate of the British Empire. This law, which Zambia retained upon independence, stipulates a penalty of fourteen years' imprisonment for consensual, private sexual relations between people of the same sex, and has resulted in numerous arrests and imprisonments. LGBT rights are greatly restricted in the country, with gays and lesbians experiencing severe societal and legal discrimination.

=== Restrictions ===
Same-sex sexual activity legal Same-sex marriage Limited recognition (foreign residency rights) No recognition of same-sex couples Same-sex sexual activity illegal Prison but not enforced Prison Death penalty on books but not enforced Enforced death penalty

The Marriage Act (Chapter 50; Bemba: Ifunde lya Cupo; Nyanja: Lamulo la Maukwati; Tonga: Mulawo wa Lukwatano; Lozi: Mulao wa Linyalo; Kaonde: Mizhilo ya Masongola; Luvale: Jishimbi ja Kulimbata; Lunda: Nshimbi ya Maluwi) does not expressly forbid same-sex marriages and does not contain a definition of marriage, but it generally refers to married spouses as "husband" and "wife". In 2006, Home Affairs Minister Ronnie Shikapwasha said that Zambia would "never" legalise same-sex marriage, calling it a "sin" that goes against the country's Christian values.

In February 2010, the Zambian National Constitutional Conference (NCC), a forum established in 2007 to debate, examine, and adopt proposals to amend the Constitution of Zambia, unanimously agreed to adopt a clause to expressly forbid marriage between people of the same sex. The forum proposed to add a constitutional provision that "a person who is eighteen years of age or older has the right to freely choose a spouse of the opposite sex and marry". The measure was supported by Minister for the Southern Province Daniel Munkombwe, who during testimony also incorrectly stated that homosexuality did not exist in non-human animals. Foreign Minister Kabinga Pande also expressed support for the clause, stating, "I think let's adopt this clause in view of what's happening in the world. We have people in some other countries that think that same sex marriage is a right. If we are not clear on this one, the same situation could come down to this country some day. It's a very progressive clause that I urge all to support." However, the clause was not passed into law. The most recent modifications to the Constitution, which were assented by President Edgar Lungu on 5 January 2016, did not contain this clause. The Constitution does not contain any provision on marriage and does not explicitly forbid marriages between people of the same sex.

== Historical and customary recognition ==
While many modern-day Zambian cultures historically practiced polygamy, there are no records of same-sex marriages being performed in local cultures in the way they are commonly defined in Western legal systems. However, there is evidence for identities and behaviours that may be placed on the LGBT spectrum. Luvale culture traditionally recognized "powerful diviner and medicine men" known as jimbandaa, who were "reputed to gain [their] powers by ritual sodomy". The jimbandaa "dress[ed], [sat], and [spoke] like women, and married men just as if they were women". This practice gradually disappeared with modernization and the introduction of Western culture and homophobia to Zambia during colonisation.

== Religious performance ==
The Catholic Church opposes same-sex marriage and does not allow its priests to officiate at such marriages. In December 2023, the Holy See published Fiducia supplicans, a declaration allowing Catholic priests to bless couples who are not considered to be married according to church teaching, including the blessing of same-sex couples. The Zambia Conference of Catholic Bishops issued the following statement on 20 December, "In order to avoid any pastoral confusion and ambiguity as well as not to break the law of our country which forbids same sex unions and activities, and while listening to our cultural heritage which does not accept same sex relationships, the Conference guides that the declaration from the Dicastery for the Doctrine of the Faith of December 18th 2023 concerning the blessing of same-sex couples be taken as for further reflection and not for implementation in Zambia."

The Church of the Province of Central Africa, part of the Anglican Communion, holds that "marriage, by divine institution, is a lifelong and exclusive union and partnership between one man and one woman". The Reformed Church in Zambia (RCZ) has not taken a stance on same-sex marriage, but the Dutch Reformed Church in South Africa (NGK), which the RCZ was founded from, has a complex history on the issue and voted in favour of blessing same-sex unions in 2015.

== See also ==
- LGBT rights in Zambia
- Recognition of same-sex unions in Africa
