= Recognition of same-sex unions in Zimbabwe =

Zimbabwe does not recognize same-sex marriages or civil unions. The Marriages Act does not provide for the recognition of same-sex marriage, and civil partnerships are only available to opposite-sex couples. The Constitution of Zimbabwe explicitly prohibits same-sex marriages.

== Legal history ==
=== Background ===
Although in very close proximity, South Africa and Zimbabwe have contrasting political histories in their post-colonial states with regard to LGBT rights. While South Africa's post-apartheid state entrenched LGBT rights in its constitution and legalised same-sex marriage in November 2006, making it the first African nation and the fifth in the world to recognise same-sex marriages, Zimbabwe's post-independent state has strongly opposed homosexuality and same-sex unions. Gays and lesbians experience severe societal and legal discrimination in Zimbabwe, often fleeing to South Africa "to enjoy greater freedom".

=== Restrictions ===
Same-sex sexual activity legal Same-sex marriage Limited recognition (foreign residency rights) No recognition of same-sex couples Same-sex sexual activity illegal Prison but not enforced Prison Death penalty on books but not enforced Enforced death penalty

The Marriages Act (Act 1 of 2022; Shona: Mutemo we Wanano; Northern Ndebele: uMthetho woMtshado; Tonga: Mulawo wa Lukwatano; Tsonga: Nawu wa Vukati; Venda: Mulayo wa Mbingano), enacted in 2022 by the Parliament of Zimbabwe, defines civil marriage as "[being] monogamous, that is to say, it is the lawful union of two persons to the exclusion of all others and no person may contract any other marriage during the subsistence of a marriage under the general law." Although it does not explicitly forbid same-sex marriages, it generally refers to married spouses as "man" and "woman". Civil partnerships, legalised with the passage of this new law in 2022, are explicitly defined as being between "a man and a woman" who are both over the age of eighteen years and who have lived together on a genuine domestic basis. However, Article 78 of the Constitution of Zimbabwe contains an explicit ban on same-sex marriages:

Persons of the same sex are prohibited from marrying each other. (Note: In the official languages of Zimbabwe: Chewa: Anthu ofanana (mwamuna ndi mwamuna kapena mukazi ndi mukazi) saloledwa kukwatilana.; Chibarwe: Wamuna wokha kana wakadzi wokha hawabvumiziwi kuroorana.; Kalanga: Banhu betjikadzi boga kene betjilume boga abatobvumigwa tolana (mbgwende).; Nambya: Banhulume boga boga kana banhukaji boga boaga abatovumilwa kulobolana pachabo.; Ndau: Vaisa vega kana madzimai ega aatenderwi kuroorana.; Northern Ndebele: Abantu abalobulili obufananayo kabavunyelwa ukuthi bathathane.; Sotho: Batho ba bong bo tsoanang ba thibetsoe ho nyalana.; Shona: Vanhurume vega kana vanhukadzi vega havatenderwi kuroorana.; Tonga: Baalumi/Banakazi tabakonzyi kukwatana aabalikke.; Tshwa: Tcuan ira ho tcuna e ǀui tci ua.na rah aha ra ha tcure ǀuyi hua ǀui am tcuta, mae na se tci tamiti.; Tsonga: Vanhu lava rimbewu rin’we va arisiwa ku tekanana.; Tswana: Batho ba bong jo bo tshwanang ba a kganelwa go nyalana.; Venda: Vhathu vha mbeu nthihi a vha tendeliwi u malana.; Xhosa: Abantu besini sinye abavumelekanga ukutshata.)

This ban was introduced in 2013 following the adoption of a new constitution. The previous constitution enacted in 1980 did not contain such a ban. The new constitution was presented to Parliament on 5 February 2013 and subsequently approved in a referendum on 16 March 2013. Parliament approved it on 9 May and President Robert Mugabe signed it into law on 22 May 2013.

== Historical and customary recognition ==
While many modern-day Zimbabwean cultures historically practiced polygamy, there are no records of same-sex marriages being performed in local cultures in the way they are commonly defined in Western legal systems. However, there is evidence for identities and behaviours that may be placed on the LGBT spectrum. In the 1990s, Canadian researcher Marc Epprecht wrote about pederastic marriages in colonial Zimbabwe. Contemporary oral evidence suggests that same-sex relationships were "common" and "prevalent" in Zimbabwe in the early 20th century, with research by Epprecht estimating that between 70% and 80% of men at the mines took on male sexual partners. It was during this time through the mining compounds and the influence of the Zulu language that the contemporary term ngochani, meaning "homosexual", entered the Shona language. These relationships differed strongly from the Western understanding of same-sex marriages, as men who entered these "mine marriages" continued to marry women and "conform, or appear to conform, to gender expectations", and would not consider themselves as homosexual or bisexual, or "unfaithful to [their] marriage vows". Epprecht further wrote that "enabling migrant men to conserve their health and resources against the temptations of [local] women [in towns near the mines], ngochani strengthened their ability to shore up proper, fecund marriages [back home]". This practice gradually disappeared as Zimbabwe became more modernized and exposed to Western culture and homophobia in the 20th century.

Evidence also suggests that same-sex sexual activity was previously "common and relatively accepted" by the San peoples. While the San maintain a system of simple marriage, they often practice polygamy and spousal exchange.

== Religious performance ==
The Catholic Church opposes same-sex marriage and does not allow its priests to officiate at such marriages. In December 2023, the Holy See published Fiducia supplicans, a declaration allowing Catholic priests to bless couples who are not considered to be married according to church teaching, including the blessing of same-sex couples. However, the Zimbabwe Catholic Bishops' Conference issued a statement on 22 December that "locally, many Catholics and those who look up to the Catholic Church are asking questions and wondering if the declaration marks a paradigm shift in the doctrine of the Church on marriage. While we have great appreciation of the declaration and the guidance it gives on blessings, we are also sensitive to the anxiety and confusion that has arisen. We would like to reiterate that the declaration is not about the change of the doctrine on marriage and neither is it about an approval of same sex unions in the Church. It is about blessings. In respect of the law of the land, our culture and for moral reasons we instruct pastors to desist from actions that may be deemed as the blessing of same-sex unions bringing confusion and even scandal to our people." The Church of the Province of Central Africa, part of the Anglican Communion, holds that "marriage, by divine institution, is a lifelong and exclusive union and partnership between one man and one woman".

In 2015, the General Synod of the Dutch Reformed Church voted by a 64% majority to recognise same-sex marriages, bless the relationships of same-sex couples and allow gay ministers and clergy (who are not required to be celibate). The decision applies to 9 of the 10 synods; with the Namibia Synod being excluded, but it does apply to the Northern Synod, which include parts of Zimbabwe. The decision caused backlash and objections, resulting in it being reversed a year later. A dozen church members subsequently took the denomination to court to restore the 2015 decision. In 2019, the North Gauteng High Court reversed the decision, ruling that while religious organizations have the freedom to define marriage the 2016 decision to ban same-sex marriage was not made in accordance with the church's proper process. A freedom of conscience clause allows pastors with objections to opt out of performing same-sex weddings, so that individual pastors are free to choose whether to bless same-sex marriages.

== See also ==
- LGBT rights in Zimbabwe
- Recognition of same-sex unions in Africa
