= Recognition of same-sex unions in Angola =

Angola does not recognize same-sex marriages or civil unions. The Family Code of Angola recognizes de facto unions but only for opposite-sex couples and bans same-sex marriage.

== Legal history ==
=== Background ===
Due to family pressure, many gay men "use marriage as a way of avoiding stigma, but once married, continue to have occasional sex with other men." The National Institute for the Fight Against AIDS (INLS) has reported that this taboo has impacts in the fight against HIV/AIDS in Angola, as messages about safe sex were "exclusively tailored to heterosexuals", leaving gay people "neither informed nor protected".

On 6 May 2005, a same-sex couple, Aleksander Gregório, 21, and his partner, known only as Bruno, 23, held a marriage ceremony at the Hotel Presidente in Luanda and signed a letter of commitment in the presence of a retired notary. The ceremony was labelled as "shameless" and "abominable" on the front pages of national newspapers.

=== Restrictions ===
Same-sex sexual activity legal Same-sex marriage Limited recognition (foreign residency rights) No recognition of same-sex couples Same-sex sexual activity illegal Prison but not enforced Prison Death penalty on books but not enforced Enforced death penalty

The Constitution of Angola does not explicitly forbid same-sex marriages. Article 35 deals with family, marriage and filiation, and establishes associated recognition and rights. It states that "men and women are equal within the family, society and the state, enjoying the same rights and having the same duties." It further states that:

The family is the basic nucleus of social organisation and shall be the object of special protection by the state, whether based on marriage or on a de facto union between a man and a woman. (Note: In some official and indigenous languages of Angola: Portuguese: A família é o núcleo fundamental da organização da sociedade e é objecto de especial protecção do Estado, quer se funde em casamento, quer em união de facto, entre homem e mulher.; Umbundu: Epata ohongele yavelapo pokati kowiñgi kwenda yikwete eteywilo linene lyanguvulu, nda ceci omanu vakwla ale kelitokeko lyaco, pokati kulume lukãyi.; Kimbundu: OMwiji yene okaxi ya katunda ya kisangela kya mundu anga yene kima kya kilangidilu kya katunda kya Unguvulu, ha yadite mu usakanu, ha mu usakanu wa kudibunda ngo, mukaxi ka muhatu ni diyala.; Kongo: Kanda dyana disina dyam'funu dya nkubila ya kintwadi ye yena kima kya lutaninu lwa luyaalu, kani kyavaangama muna longo, kani kyanzatwakala kweto, muna kati kya yakala ya n'kento.)

De facto unions (Portuguese: união de facto, pronounced [uˈnjɐ̃w̃ dɨ ˈfaktu]) are regulated by the Family Code and can only be recognised if "all legal requirements for the celebration of marriage are met". Article 112 of the Code defines de facto unions as the "voluntary establishment of common life between a man and a woman". Hence, these unions are available only to opposite-sex couples. In 2020, there were more de facto unions performed in Angola than marriages. Article 20 of the Family Code defines marriage as "the voluntary union between a man and a woman." The United Nations Development Programme reported in 2021 that "this regime of family law significantly curtails LGBTI peoples' fundamental rights, and also impacts other laws, resulting in the rights derived from marriage and family being denied to LGBTI persons (e.g. the right of a spouse not to testify before a court of law)." In 2013, discussions on modifications to the Family Code to recognize same-sex unions were vehemently opposed by religious groups.

== Historical and customary recognition ==
While many modern-day Angolan cultures historically practiced polygamy, there are no records of same-sex marriages being performed in local cultures in the way they are commonly defined in Western legal systems. However, there is evidence for identities and behaviours that may be placed on the LGBT spectrum. Early Europeans to visit modern-day Angola, including anthropologists, ethnologists and priests, reported "same-sex marriage ceremonies" among the Ovimbundu and the Ambundu, the two largest ethnic groups in Angola, as well as the smaller Ovambo and Herero peoples, who mostly live in neighboring Namibia. Ambundu culture traditionally recognized "powerful diviner and medicine men" known as quimbanda, who were "reputed to gain [their] powers by ritual sodomy". The quimbanda "dress[ed], [sat], and [spoke] like women, and married men just as if they were women". Queen Nzinga of Ndongo and Matamba is known to have acquired a harem of wives, who were biologically male but dressed as women and took on female gender roles. Ovimbundu society likewise recognized people fulfilling a third gender role, known as chibanda, who "[were] men attyred like women, and behave[d] themselves womanly […] and also married to men". British-American ethnologist Wilfrid Dyson Hambly reported in 1937 that an Ovimbundu informant had said that in Mbundu society, "There are men who want men, and women who want women."

These customs gradually disappeared with modernization and the introduction of Western culture and homophobia to Angola during colonisation. In 2007, a local anthropologist was quoted as saying, "Angolan society is not yet prepared to accept homosexuals. The local culture, which is influenced by Christianity, calls for the perpetuation and expansion of the family. Homosexuality is therefore viewed as an affront to the laws of nature."

== Religious performance ==
The Catholic Church opposes same-sex marriage and does not allow its priests to officiate at such marriages. In December 2023, the Holy See published Fiducia supplicans, a declaration allowing Catholic priests to bless couples who are not considered to be married according to church teaching, including the blessing of same-sex couples. However, the Episcopal Conference of Angola and São Tomé expressed "perplexity" at the declaration, and issued a statement that "regarding informal blessings for 'irregular couples' (homosexuals), although it is a sacrament different from the liturgical blessing, we consider that, in our cultural and ecclesial context, it would create enormous scandal and confusion among the faithful, so we have determined that it should not be carried out in Angola and São Tomé."

As the Anglican Church of Southern Africa was discussing the possibility of blessing same-sex unions, dioceses in Angola and Mozambique split to "form a more conservative Anglican province" in 2021. Known as the Anglican Church of Mozambique and Angola, it does not offer blessings to same-sex unions.

== See also ==
- LGBT rights in Angola
- Recognition of same-sex unions in Africa
