= Recognition of same-sex unions in Seychelles =

Seychelles does not recognise same-sex marriages or civil unions. The Civil Code of Seychelles does not provide for the recognition of same-sex unions, and the Constitution of Seychelles grants the state the power to restrict marriage to persons of the opposite sex.

== Legal history ==
=== Background ===
Same-sex sexual relations were previously prohibited in Seychelles under a British colonial-era law. This law stipulated a penalty of 14 years' imprisonment for consensual, private sexual relations between people of the same sex, although it had never been enforced. A bill repealing the criminalisation of homosexuality was enacted in 2016. Laws prohibiting discrimination on the basis of sexual orientation and a more welcoming and accepting society relative to other African nations have cemented Seychelles as one of "Africa's most LGBT-friendly countries".

In June 2015, a same-sex couple, a British national and a Seychellois national who also held British citizenship, were married by High Commissioner Lindsay Skoll at her residence in Bel Air. The marriage was performed under British law and lacks legal recognition in Seychelles. Attorney General Ronny Govinden said, "We do not consider them married and their marriage does not have any legal standing, for example if they decide to adopt they will not be able to adopt the child as a married couple. If one of them dies… the inheritance laws… the one left behind will not be considered as a surviving spouse, if there is any pension the other will not be entitled to any benefit." The marriage proved controversial, and was criticised by some religious leaders. Bishop Denis Wiehe said the wedding would cause "a state of complete confusion in the minds of our fellow citizens". The Seychelles Principal Secretary for Foreign Affairs, Maurice Loustau-Lalanne, described the marriage ceremony as "lacking in sensitivity". The British High Commission said the two men "were legally entitled to be married by an appropriate British official on British territory". "Should the government of Seychelles have declined to give permission, such a service would not have been offered. The British High Commission has complete respect for the laws, culture, beliefs and values of the Republic of Seychelles." The British High Commission "sought and has been granted permission [by the government] to provide this service."

=== Restrictions ===
Same-sex sexual activity legal Same-sex marriage Limited recognition (foreign residency rights) No recognition of same-sex couples Same-sex sexual activity illegal Prison but not enforced Prison Death penalty on books but not enforced Enforced death penalty

The Civil Code of Seychelles, enacted in 2020, governs the requirements and application process for couples wishing to marry. Although it does not contain an explicit definition of marriage, it states that a marriage is void if "the parties to the marriage [are] not respectively male and female". As a result, same-sex couples cannot marry in Seychelles and do not have access to the legal rights, benefits and obligations of marriage, including protection from domestic violence, adoption rights, tax benefits and inheritance rights, among others. Marriage in Seychelles was previously governed by the Civil Status Act (Chapter 34; French: Loi sur l'état civil; Seychellois Creole: Lalwa lo leta sivil). The act did not expressly forbid same-sex marriages and did not contain a definition of marriage. However, it generally referred to married spouses as "man" and "woman", and used gender-specific terminology with regard to married spouses. Civil unions (French: union civile, pronounced [ynjɔ̃ sivil]; Seychellois Creole: linyon sivil), which would offer some of the rights and benefits of marriage, are likewise not recognised in Seychelles.

Article 32(1) of the Constitution of Seychelles describes the family "as the natural and fundamental element of society" and recognises "the right of everyone to form a family". However, Article 32(2) states:

The right contained in clause (1) may be subject to such restrictions as may be prescribed by law and necessary in a democratic society including the prevention of marriage between persons of the same sex or persons within certain family degrees.

In July 2022, activists met President Wavel Ramkalawan to discuss the possibility of legalising same-sex marriage. "We spoke mostly about people who are already married, having done so overseas with both either being Seychellois or one Seychellois and the other an expatriate. Marriage is recognised internationally but we also want recognition here in Seychelles", said activist Sasha Alis.

== Religious performance ==
The Catholic Church, the largest Christian denomination in Seychelles, opposes same-sex marriage and does not allow its priests to officiate at such marriages. In 2015, it criticized the British High Commission for conducting a same-sex marriage as causing "a state of complete confusion in the minds of our fellow citizens". In December 2023, the Holy See published Fiducia supplicans, a declaration allowing Catholic priests to bless couples who are not considered to be married according to church teaching, including the blessing of same-sex couples. The Episcopal Conference of the Indian Ocean did not issue a public statement on the declaration.

The Church of the Province of the Indian Ocean, part of the Anglican Communion, also opposes same-sex marriage. In 2009, Bishop James Wong stated that "[t]he church should be able to welcome all the people with different tendencies but at the same time the Bible says homosexuality is a sin. In the church there are people who lie and steal. Christ died for all the sinners and we should not be judgemental. We should love and care for them but at the same time tell them the truth about the Bible". He called the marriage at the British High Commissioner's residence in 2015 a "sin". Following the Church of England's decision to allow clergy to bless same-sex civil marriages in 2023, the Church of the Province of the Indian Ocean co-signed a statement that it would "no longer [be] able to recognize" the Archbishop of Canterbury as the leader of the Anglican Communion.

== See also ==
- LGBT rights in Seychelles
- Recognition of same-sex unions in Africa
- Same-sex marriage in South Africa
