= Recognition of same-sex unions in Kenya =

Kenya does not recognise same-sex marriages or civil unions. The Constitution of Kenya does not explicitly address same-sex marriage, but was modified in 2010 to state that "every adult has the right to marry a person of the opposite sex, based on the free consent of the parties".

Although same-sex marriage is not legally recognized in Kenya, other forms of societal and symbolic recognition do take place. These cultural practices may not be common or widespread, but they have been documented in ethnographic studies and hold deep meaning for those involved in the unions.

== Legal history ==
=== Background ===
In October 2009, two men, Charles Ngengi and Daniel Chege, entered into a civil partnership in the United Kingdom. The ceremony received widespread attention in Kenya, mostly critical. Chege's relatives were harassed by residents in his home village in Murang'a County. In 2020, a Kenyan priest, John Maierepi, married his South African partner Paul Mwaura in South Africa, where same-sex marriage has been legal since 2006.

In February 2010, a rumour spread in the coastal town of Mtwapa that two men were going to marry in a local hotel. The rumour unleashed a "house-to-house witch hunt by anti-gay vigilantes, street attacks targeting gay men, the sacking of an AIDS-fighting medical center, and a widening wave of ultra-homophobic national media coverage." Five days before the date of the non-existent wedding, "many of the muftis and imams discussed the impending wedding during Friday prayers and asked the community to be vigilant against homosexuals. They told their congregants to demonstrate and to flush out homosexuals from the midst of Mtwapa and to ensure that no gay wedding took place". A press conference condemning the wedding was held by the regional coordinator of the Council of Imams and Preachers of Kenya, together with the regional representative of the National Council of Churches of Kenya. They warned that "God is about to punish the fastest-growing town in the Coast region. Come night, come day, we shall not allow that marriage to be conducted in this town tomorrow. We shall stand firm to flush out gays who throng this town every weekend from all corners of this country." They also denounced a local clinic run by the Kenya Medical Research Institute, which had a HIV/AIDS program for counseling and treating men who have sex with men; "We ask that the government shut it down with immediate effect or we will descend on its officials."

=== Restrictions ===
Same-sex sexual activity legal Same-sex marriage Limited recognition (foreign residency rights) No recognition of same-sex couples Same-sex sexual activity illegal Prison but not enforced Prison Death penalty on books but not enforced Enforced death penalty

The Marriage Act (Act 4 of 2014; Swahili: Sheria ya Ndoa; Kikuyu: Watho wa Kĩhiko; Dholuo: Chik mar Kend; Kamba: Mwĩao wa Mũtwaano), assented by President Uhuru Kenyatta on 29 April 2014, defines marriage as "the voluntary union of a man and a woman whether in a monogamous or polygamous union". The act, which entered into force on 20 May, thus bans same-sex marriage. As a result, same-sex couples cannot marry in Kenya and do not have access to the legal rights, benefits and obligations of marriage, including protection from domestic violence, adoption rights, tax benefits and inheritance rights, among others. The Constitution of Kenya describes the family as the "natural and fundamental unit of society and the necessary basis of social order, and shall enjoy the recognition and protection of the State." The Constitution was modified in 2010 to state that:

Every adult has the right to marry a person of the opposite sex, based on the free consent of the parties. (Note: Swahili: Kila mtu mzima ana haki ya kuoa mtu wa jinsia tofauti na yake na kulingana na makubaliano yao.)

In April 2026, Justice Katwa Kigen, who sits on the Court of Appeal of Kenya, argued that the "Constitution inherently allows for the recognition of same-sex family structures under its interpretation of rights and freedoms".

=== Customary marriage cases ===
The first court case on the issue of customary female same-sex marriages occurred in 1981, when in Maria Gisese v Marcella Nyomenda the High Court ruled that the lack of choice from the female "wife" on the matter of which man should have sexual intercourse with her (as the female "husband" decides with whom the female "wife" may have sex) was "repugnant to justice and an abuse of an individual freedom of choice", and thus did not "fit in with modern developments". The court also ruled that female same-sex marriages performed under Kisii customary law could not be recognized. However, the High Court ruled differently in Esther Chepkuaui v Chepngeno Kobot Chebet and Johanah Kipsang later that year, holding that, although the marriage was "an abuse and indeed repugnant to justice and morality, the practice is in force and remains to be recognised by the entire community such as the Nandi", and therefore should be recognized as a customary law practice.

The status of these marriages became uncertain following the 2010 constitutional amendment and the passage of the Marriage Act, 2014. In October 2018, a court in Machakos County ruled that it could not legally dissolve a customary iweto marriage between Josephine Ndulu and Angela Nyamai. The two women had married in 2005 according to traditional Kamba customs, but Nyamai sought a divorce in 2016. However, the court ruled that the "parties to such a union cannot move the court for dissolution of marriage. [...] The nature of the marriage is not governed by the Marriage Act. It is inconsistent with the institution of marriage as envisaged by the Marriage Act as well as Article 45 of the Constitution." Other cases have dealt with succession rights within customary female same-sex marriages. In 2011, the Mombasa High Court ruled in Monica Jesang Katam v Jackson Chepkwony and Selina Jemaiyo Tirop that the female "wife" belonged to the household of the deceased female "husband" and thus could inherit her property. In coming to this conclusion, the court referred to "scholarly writings supporting the existence and acceptance of the [customary Nandi] institution, and identified the importance attached to culture in the Constitution as a principle to guide interpretation." In 2014, the Court of Appeal also upheld succession rights for the female "wife" in Agnes Kwamboka Ombuna v Birisira Kerubo Ombuna.

== Historical and customary recognition ==
Female same-sex marriages are practiced among the Kikuyu, Luo, Kamba, Kisii, Kipsigis, Nandi, and Suba. Approximately 5–10% of women in these nations are in such marriages. However, they are not perceived as same-sex relationships in the way they are commonly defined in Western legal systems, but rather as a way for families without sons to keep their inheritance within the family. The couples are considered married, though are referred to as "mother-in-law" and "daughter-in-law". The female "husband" (the "mother-in-law") carries on the family name and property, while the female "wife" (the "daughter-in-law") bears children, with the intention of having a son. The female "husband" may be widowed, but may also have a living male husband, but he will not be a father to the female "wife's" children, and the identity of the biological father, though often kin, is kept secret. Such marriages may be polygamous; in 2010 a woman was interviewed who had taken five wives. "Cross-culturally, women take wives under three circumstances, all of which increase the status of the female husband: 1) barren women and widows take wives to obtain rights over children produced; 2) rich women accumulate wives to gain prestige and wealth in the same way men do through polygyny; and 3) in some societies where women have the right to have a daughter-in-law, women without sons can exercise their right to a daughter-in-law by marrying a woman and giving her to a non-existent son."

Among the Kikuyu, kũhikania, the process of getting married, and ũhiki, the wedding ceremony, take place in the same manner for female same-sex marriages as with different-sex marriages. There is no separate term to differentiate a female same-sex marriage from a different-sex marriage. As same-sex marriages are not sanctioned by the various Christian churches in Kenya, kũhikania and ũhiki continue to be performed through customary guidelines. Amongst the Luo, female same-sex marriages, referred to as chi mwandu, take place between a childless widow and another woman. The female "husband" belongs to the clan of her husband but the "wife" belongs to the widow and her clan. Likewise, the Kamba recognise iweto marriages which are "woman-to-woman union[s] sanctioned by Kamba customary law". The Kipsigis call this institution ketunchi toloch (literally "one marries for support"), with the female "husband" observing the same betrothal rites as a man seeking a wife. British anthropologist George Wynn Brereton Huntingford wrote with respect to the Nandi in 1973:

A Nandi widow who had no children but possessed cattle could marry a young woman and become her manong'otiot ("husband") by paying the current rate of bridewealth, whereupon the young woman became her "wife". This gave both women the legal and social status of husband and wife respectively. There was no lesbianism involved here, for the female husband could have her own men friends and the wife could have intercourse with any man of whom her "husband" approved. If she had children, not the man, but the female "husband" of the young man was the sociological father.

Historically, the Meru recognized ritual leaders who "publicly acted like women" and "would dress as women routinely and sometimes even marry other men". Known as mugwe (plural: agwe) in the Meru language, these individuals were spiritual leaders whose primary role was to "lead [their] people in dealings with God, either by offering propitiatory sacrifices (such as praying for rains and consequent good harvests and grazing) or expiatory sacrifices whenever a serious fault was committed by a group or an individual of the tribe and needed the appeasement of God or the spirits." It was believed that the agwe were "in direct contact with God". This practice gradually disappeared as Kenya became more modernized and exposed to Western culture and homophobia in the 20th century.

== Religious performance ==
Same-sex marriage is strongly opposed by Kenya's largest religious denominations. The Catholic Church opposes same-sex marriage and does not allow its priests to officiate at such marriages. In December 2023, the Holy See published Fiducia supplicans, a declaration allowing Catholic priests to bless couples who are not considered to be married according to church teaching, including the blessing of same-sex couples. The Kenya Conference of Catholic Bishops issued a statement that the declaration "does not in any way approve of 'same-sex marriages' nor try to give a back-door recognition of such a union." The statement added: "In our African context, while recognizing the confusion existing in the more developed countries, of new unchristian models of 'conjugal union' and 'styles of life', we are very clear on what a family and marriage is. The social situation of same-sex marriages does not find acceptance in our culture." On 23 December, Archbishop Philip Arnold Subira Anyolo said that "all clergy residing and ministering in the Archdiocese of Nairobi are prohibited from blessing irregular relationships, unions, or same-sex couples."

In 2015, the Anglican Church of Kenya declared a state of impaired communion with the Episcopal Church of the United States over its decision to allow blessings of same-sex unions and non-celibate gay clergy. In 2023, Archbishop Jackson Ole Sapit criticized the Church of England's decision to allow clergy to bless same-sex civil marriages: "It is ridiculous that the Church of England affirms to remain faithful to the traditional teachings of marriage yet have sanctioned the so-called prayers of love to be used in their Churches to bless unions between persons of same-sex. This is hypocritical and a blatant lie for there is only one truth and not many versions or opinions of it." The Presbyterian Church of East Africa, the Evangelical Lutheran Church in Kenya, and Quakers also oppose same-sex unions.

== Public opinion ==
A Pew Research Center poll conducted between February and May 2023 showed that 9% of Kenyans supported same-sex marriage, 90% were opposed and 1% did not know or had refused to answer. When divided by age, support was highest among 18–34-year-olds at 12% and lowest among those aged 35 and above at 5%.

== See also ==
- LGBT rights in Kenya
- Recognition of same-sex unions in Africa
