= Recognition of same-sex unions in Rwanda =

Rwanda does not recognise same-sex marriages or civil unions. The Constitution of Rwanda forbids same-sex marriage, having been modified in 2003 to state that "a civil monogamous marriage between a man and a woman is the only recognised marital union."

== Legal history ==
=== Background ===
Same-sex sexual relations are legal in Rwanda. Nevertheless, gays and lesbians continue to experience societal and legal discrimination, and social rejection remains a "daily reality for many". Some LGBT people have reported being harassed and blackmailed. In February 2017, a Rwandan TV journalist proposed to her same-sex partner, and they publicly prepared for a wedding abroad. Their engagement "sparked anger" in the media and civil society.

In 2022, John Mudakikwa, executive director of the Centre for Rule of Law Rwanda (CERULAR), said, "This community may need special rules, I mean, special laws. We may need laws on marriage, same sex marriage. We may need laws regulating or punishing anti-discrimination of all forms. Discrimination including LGBT people. We need the laws and policies to recognise LGBT persons as a distinct group of people."

=== Restrictions ===
Same-sex sexual activity legal Same-sex marriage Limited recognition (foreign residency rights) No recognition of same-sex couples Same-sex sexual activity illegal Prison but not enforced Prison Death penalty on books but not enforced Enforced death penalty

The Law governing persons and family (Kinyarwanda: Itegeko rigenga abantu n'umuryango; French: Loi régissant les personnes et la famille; Swahili: Sheria inayosimamia watu na familia) does not expressly forbid same-sex marriages and does not contain a definition of marriage. Article 166 states that "civil monogamous marriage contracted upon mutual consent before the public administration is the only marriage recognised by law." The law does not explicitly define marriage in gender-specific terms. Nevertheless, same-sex couples cannot marry in Rwanda and do not have access to the legal rights, benefits and obligations of marriage, including protection from domestic violence, adoption rights, tax benefits and inheritance rights, among others. Civil unions, which would offer some of the rights and benefits of marriage, are likewise not recognised in Rwanda.

Article 17 of the Constitution of Rwanda explicitly bans same-sex marriage:

A civil monogamous marriage between a man and a woman is the only recognised marital union. (Note: In the official languages of Rwanda: Kinyarwanda: Ugushyingiranwa k'umugabo umwe n'umugore umwe gukorewe mu butegetsi bwa Leta ni ko kwemewe.; French: Le mariage civil monogamique entre un homme et une femme est la seule union conjugale reconnue.; Swahili: Ndoa ya kiserikali ya mume mmoja na mke mmoja ndiyo muungano pekee wa ndoa unaotambuliwa kisheria.)

This constitutional ban was enacted with the adoption of a new constitution in May 2003 in a referendum. Article 18 of the Constitution further states that "the family, being the natural foundation of the Rwandan society, is protected by the State. [...] The State puts in place appropriate legislation and organs for the protection of the family, particularly the child and mother, in order to ensure that the family flourishes." Article 17 also guarantees "the right to marry and found a family", and that "spouses are entitled to equal rights and obligations at the time of marriage, during the marriage and at the time of divorce."

== Historical and customary recognition ==
In the Kingdom of Rwanda, male homosexual relations were common among young Hutus and Tutsis. In 1986, a 19-year-old Tutsi man was recorded as saying that "traditionally, in his tribe, there was an extended period during which boys lived apart from the rest of the village while they are training to be warriors, during which very emotional, and often sexual, relationships were struck up... Sometimes these relationships lasted beyond adolescence into adulthood. Watusi still have a reputation for bisexuality in the cities of East Africa." Young men served in the royal courts and provided sexual services for visitors and elites. In addition, there were traditions of "cross-dressing priests", known as ikihindu, who "carr[ied] out feminine roles and donn[ed] women's regalia" and would play the role of shamans and healers. All these practices gradually disappeared as Rwanda became more modernized and exposed to Western culture and homophobia in the 20th century.

== Religious performance ==
The Catholic Church opposes same-sex marriage and does not allow its priests to officiate at such marriages. In December 2023, the Holy See published Fiducia supplicans, a declaration allowing Catholic priests to bless couples who are not considered to be married according to church teaching, including the blessing of same-sex couples. The Episcopal Conference of Rwanda issued a statement on 21 December 2023 that the declaration "does not change the teaching of the Church regarding the blessing of the sacrament of Holy Matrimony." It concluded that "the teachings of the Church on Christian marriage have not changed. For this reason, the Church cannot bless same-sex relationships because it would contradict God's law and our culture."

== See also ==
- LGBT rights in Rwanda
- Recognition of same-sex unions in Africa
