= Recognition of same-sex unions in Mauritius =

Mauritius does not recognise same-sex marriages or civil unions. The Civil Code of Mauritius does not provide for the recognition of same-sex unions.

== Legal history ==
=== Background ===
Same-sex sexual relations were previously prohibited in Mauritius under a British colonial-era law. This law stipulated a penalty of five years' imprisonment for consensual, private sexual relations between people of the same sex. Although it was generally not enforced, instances were occasionally reported to the police, instilling fear in the LGBT community. It was struck down as unconstitutional by the Supreme Court of Mauritius in October 2023. Laws prohibiting discrimination on the basis of sexual orientation, and a more welcoming and accepting society relative to other African nations have cemented Mauritius as one of "Africa's most LGBT-friendly countries". Nevertheless, LGBT people report frequent discrimination and abuse in everyday life, particularly from family members. Media outlets have reported that many LGBT people are forced into opposite-sex "corrective marriages".

=== Restrictions ===
Same-sex sexual activity legal Same-sex marriage Limited recognition (foreign residency rights) No recognition of same-sex couples Same-sex sexual activity illegal Prison but not enforced Prison Death penalty on books but not enforced Enforced death penalty

The Civil Code of Mauritius does not expressly forbid same-sex marriages and does not contain a definition of marriage. However, it generally refers to married spouses as "man" and "woman". As a result, same-sex couples do not have access to the legal rights, benefits and obligations of marriage, including protection from domestic violence, adoption rights, tax benefits and inheritance rights, among others. In addition, a same-sex couple composed of a Mauritian and a foreign national, whose marriage was performed abroad in a country where same-sex marriage is legal, will not benefit from the same rights as a married heterosexual couple. The foreign spouse will not be able to receive a residence permit, whereas they would have benefited from one if they were of the opposite sex. The Civil Status Act (Act 23 of 1981; French: Loi sur l'état civil; Mauritian Creole: Lalwa lor leta sivil) further stipulates the requirements and application process for couples wishing to marry in either a civil marriage ceremony or a religious ceremony. Similarly, it does not contain an explicit definition of marriage and does not expressly ban same-sex marriages. Civil unions (French: union civile, pronounced [ynjɔ̃ sivil]; Mauritian Creole: linyon sivil, pronounced [liɲɔ̃ sivil]), which would offer some of the rights and benefits of marriage, are likewise not recognised in Mauritius. In 2016, the Law Reform Commission announced it "was looking into" a case to legalise same-sex marriage, but no law changes were made.

The Constitution of Mauritius does not explicitly ban same-sex marriages, but prohibits discrimination on a variety of grounds including race, creed and sex. The Supreme Court held in 2023 in Ah Seek v The State of Mauritius that the category "sex" includes sexual orientation. However, the court did not rule whether this constitutional prohibition of discrimination guarantees same-sex couples the right to marry. Several LGBT activists consider a case challenging the ban on same-sex marriages as "winnable". In 2023, activists announced they would continue to campaign for social and legal changes for LGBT people, particularly with regard to "marriage equality and the recognition of transgender people", as well as the banning of conversion therapy and the inclusion of sexual orientation and gender identity in existing hate speech and hate crime legislation. In July 2026, the National Human Rights Commission (NHRC) issued a report calling for the legalization of same-sex marriage, concluding that Mauritian law does not contain any explicit prohibition on same-sex marriage and refusal by the civil registry could constitute discrimination based on sexual orientation as per the ruling in Ah Seek. Activist Anushka Virahsawmy stated in response, "Being socially ready is one thing. Being politically ready to change the law is another. Several obstacles remain. The first is political: the issue remains sensitive, and some decision-makers hesitate to address it for fear of dividing public opinion or suffering electoral losses. Added to this are institutional resistances, with some administrative practices continuing to rely on a traditional understanding of marriage, despite the absence of an explicit prohibition in the law." In November 2026, after having been denied recognition by the Civil Status Office in Port Louis in 2024, a same-sex couple legally married in the United Kingdom filed a constitutional complaint seeking legal recognition of their marriage under Mauritian law.

== Religious performance ==
The Catholic Church, the largest Christian denomination in Mauritius, opposes same-sex marriage and does not allow its priests to officiate at such marriages. In December 2023, the Holy See published Fiducia supplicans, a declaration allowing Catholic priests to bless couples who are not considered to be married according to church teaching, including the blessing of same-sex couples. The Episcopal Conference of the Indian Ocean did not issue a public statement on the declaration.

The Church of the Province of the Indian Ocean, part of the Anglican Communion, also opposes same-sex marriage. Archbishop James Wong stated in 2009 that "[t]he church should be able to welcome all the people with different tendencies but at the same time the Bible says homosexuality is a sin. In the church there are people who lie and steal. Christ died for all the sinners and we should not be judgemental. We should love and care for them but at the same time tell them the truth about the Bible". He also called a same-sex marriage performed at the British High Commissioner's residence in Seychelles in 2015 a "sin". Following the Church of England's decision to allow clergy to bless same-sex civil marriages in 2023, the Church of the Province of the Indian Ocean co-signed a statement that it would "no longer [be] able to recognize" the Archbishop of Canterbury as the leader of the Anglican Communion.

== Public opinion ==
A 2024 survey by The Other Foundation showed that 37% of Mauritians supported same-sex marriage, while 50% opposed.

== See also ==
- LGBT rights in Mauritius
- Recognition of same-sex unions in Africa
- Same-sex marriage in South Africa
