= Carlos Fernandes (activist) =

LGBTQ+ activist (1983–2024)

Carlos Anderson Henriques Fernandes (October 12, 1983 – February 26, 2024) was a prominent Angolan LGBT activist as well as the director and a founder of Iris Angola Association, the country's first LGBT organization. His work helped lead to the decriminalisation of homosexuality in Angola and improving the country's LGBTI rights.

== Life ==
Fernandes could tell he was different by the age of five. He describes himself as "a gay child, crazy about Madonna and Michael Jackson." Though his family supported him, he felt lonely since he did not know any other LGBTQ+ people, and he regularly heard people in his community use homophobic slurs. In 1996, he moved to Portugal to live with his mother's family. He first became involved with the gay community when he was an 18 year old living in Valencia, Spain. During his time in Spain, he would visit the gay night clubs that he had never experienced in Angola and start his first public romantic relationship. Also in Spain, he developed a drug addiction that would harm him later into his adulthood.

Fernandes would revisit Portugal to introduce his partner to his family. While there, he connected with the Portuguese gay community. Fernandes eventually returned to Angola once his relationship ended. He stayed with his dad's family and worked for a construction company owned by his relatives. He eventually gained the position of director at age 23 before losing the position due to his addiction. He became depressed until he recovered from his addiction five years later.

During his recovery, Fernandes searched for support from fellow LGBTQ people. A network of people advertising gay parties called As Divas would tell people where the next party would be since the locations were not consistent. Through these parties, As Diva would come together with Population Services International (PSI) and go on to meet with Lambda (a Mozambican LGBT+ organization) and UNAIDS to form an LGBTQ+ organization. In 2013, Iris Angola Association was conceived "to contribute to a future in which sexual minorities have space, voice, participation and rights in Angolan society", as Fernandes and fellow Iris activist Paula Sebastião described it in their Dezanove interview.

Fernandes agreed to assist with the organization's project about HIV prevention aimed towards MSM (men who have sex with men.) Fernandes continued to put faith in Iris Angola even as UNAIDS withdrew their offer of financial support.

== Career ==
In his early career, Fernandes worked a variety of jobs such as advertising distribution in Portugal, construction assistance in Spain, and management of Bar Manda Fama in Luanda, Angola.

Iris Angola, UNAIDS, and other groups pushed towards the revision of Angola's penal code to legalize homosexuality in the country and sought legal protections for sexual minorities, resulting in the adoption of a new penal code 2019. The new penal code legalized same sex sexual conduct and made discrimination on the basis of sexual orientation illegal; it was signed by Angola's president in 2020 and came into effect in 2021.

Fernandes participated in a 2021 pride month celebration at the U.S. embassy in Luanda. The event, called "You Are Included", took place over Facebook live. It consisted of a discussion on LGBT+ issues with other Angolan activists including the transgender activist Immani da Silva, Liria de Castro from Arquivo de Identidade Angolano, and Michel Kouakou from the UNAIDS organization.

In 2022, Fernandes was interviewed on RTP Africa to talk about Iris Angola and LGBT issues in Angola. The same year, Fernandes served as an interlocutor for an oral history project made by GALA Queer Archive and the Arquivo de Identidade Angolano. The project focused on Angolan queer activism with the goal of creating an archive of queer life in the country. According to Caio Simões de Araújo, a leader of the project, he was aware that Fernandes was working on a documentary about LGBTQI+ activism before his death.

== Views ==
Fernandes believed that healthcare discrimination and lack of access to education caused many LGBT people in Angola to be unemployed. He said, "In schools we have some problems and sometimes sexuality cannot be acknowledged because access to health and employment is difficult, because of this, a large part of them [the LGBT community] are not working."

Fernandes did not emphasize marriage equality, saying that "Marriage is not a part of our priorities." Instead, he said his organization was focused "towards protecting the rights of sexual minorities and for the continued development of the LGBTQI community."

Fernandes also expressed concerns about family abuse towards gay and transgender children. He said of transgender children that "Our [Iris Angola's] main concerns relate to families, as we continue to receive young people and adolescents who have suffered a lot of verbal and physical abuse at home, depriving them of their freedom." He also discussed how parents often refuse to pay for gay children's education and the stigma gay people face when looking for employment.

== Death ==
Carlos Fernandes was found dead in his home on February 26, 2024. His death is a suspected homicide by asphyxiation. According to statements on Iris Angola's Facebook page, mourners attending his funeral at Benfica Cemetery were attacked. As of 2025, the investigation has not found conclusive answers about the circumstances of Fernandes' death.
