= Recognition of same-sex unions in Uganda =

Uganda does not recognise same-sex marriages or civil unions. The Constitution of Uganda forbids same-sex marriage, having been modified in 2005 to state that "marriage between persons of the same sex is prohibited."

== Legal history ==
=== Background ===
Same-sex sexual relations are outlawed under a colonial-era law inherited when Uganda was a protectorate of the British Empire. This law, which Uganda retained upon independence, was further amended by several pieces of legislation, including the Anti-Homosexuality Act (Act 6 of 2013), which severely restricts freedom of speech on LGBT topics and stipulates the death penalty for "aggravated homosexuality". This law prescribes up to twenty years' imprisonment for the "promotion of homosexuality", and life imprisonment for consensual, private sexual relations between people of the same sex. LGBT rights are greatly restricted in the country, with gays and lesbians experiencing severe societal and legal discrimination.

=== Restrictions ===
Same-sex sexual activity legal Same-sex marriage Limited recognition (foreign residency rights) No recognition of same-sex couples Same-sex sexual activity illegal Prison but not enforced Prison Death penalty on books but not enforced Enforced death penalty

The Marriage Act (Chapter 146; Swahili: Sheria ya Ndoa; Luganda: Etteeka Ly'obufumbo; Runyakitara: Eiteeka Ry'obushwere; Lusoga: Eteeka Ly'obufumbo; Acholi: Cik pa Nyom) does not expressly forbid same-sex marriages and does not contain a definition of marriage. However, it generally refers to married spouses as "husband" and "wife". As a result, same-sex couples cannot marry in Uganda and do not have access to the legal rights, benefits and obligations of marriage, including protection from domestic violence, adoption rights, tax benefits and inheritance rights, among others. The Anti-Homosexuality Act provides for ten years' imprisonment for individuals entering a same-sex marriage. The bill was passed by the Parliament of Uganda in March 2023, and signed into law by President Museveni in April. Civil unions, which would offer some of the rights and benefits of marriage, are likewise not recognised in Uganda.

On 29 September 2005, President Yoweri Museveni signed a constitutional amendment explicitly prohibiting same-sex marriage. Article 31(2a) states:

Marriage between persons of the same sex is prohibited. (Note: In some official and indigenous languages of Uganda: Acholi: Nyom ikin coo onyo mon keken pe twere.; Luganda: Obufumbo wakati w'abantu ab'ekikula ekimu (nga bombi bakazi oba nga bombi basajja) tebukkirizibwa.; Lugbara: Aje agupi pini ma eselea agupiru kaniku oku pini yi ma esela okuru 'diyi 'ba ga si.; Lusoga: Obufumbo ghagati w'abantu abekikula ekilala tibwiikiriza.; Karamojong: Akiruk alokiding ngitunga ngulu ikwaan ikwa ekile ka ekile kori aberu ka aberu inges engerikinitoe.; Swahili: Ndoa za watu wa jinsia moja ni marufuku.)

Previously, the Constitution did not explicitly forbid same-sex marriages. Article 31(3) states that "marriage shall be entered into with the free consent of the man and woman intending to marry." Further, Article 31(1) holds that "a man and a woman are entitled to marry only if they are each of the age of eighteen years and above and are entitled at that age to found a family; and to equal rights at and in marriage, during marriage, and at its dissolution."

== Historical and customary recognition ==
While many modern-day Ugandan cultures historically practiced polygamy, there are no records of same-sex marriages being performed in local cultures in the way they are commonly defined in Western legal systems. However, there is evidence for identities and behaviours that may be placed on the LGBT spectrum. The Lango traditionally recognised mudoko dako, individuals assigned male at birth but who were treated by Lango society as women and allowed to marry men. British anthropologist Jack Herbert Driberg reported in 1923 that they were "rare", but some of his Lango informants told him that the mudoko dako were "very common" among groups to the east, specially the Teso and the Karamojong. Jeremy Lawrance stated in the 1950s that among the Teso "people of hermaphroditic instincts are very numerous... The men are impotent and have the instincts of women and become women to all intents and purposes; their voices are feminine and their manner of walking and of speech is feminine. They shave their heads like a woman and wear women's ornaments and clothing. They do women's work and take women's names." However, he wrote that he knew "no cases in which they live with men as a 'wife'".

In Buganda, one of the largest traditional kingdoms in Uganda, certain forms of same-sex relations were institutionalised. Young men served in the royal courts and provided sexual services for visitors and elites. It was an open secret that Mwanga II, who ruled in the latter half of the 19th century, was bisexual. All these practices gradually disappeared as Uganda became more modernized and exposed to Western culture and homophobia in the 20th century.

== Religious performance ==
The Catholic Church opposes same-sex marriage and does not allow its priests to officiate at such marriages. In December 2023, the Holy See published Fiducia supplicans, a declaration allowing Catholic priests to bless couples who are not considered to be married according to church teaching, including the blessing of same-sex couples. The Uganda Episcopal Conference condemned the declaration, issuing a statement that "the blessing which the Declaration says could be given to everyone refers to prayers that people may request for. For those in the state of sin, the prayers are meant to lead them to conversion. Therefore, the prayers for persons in same-sex relationships are not intended to legitimize their way of life, but to lead them on the path of conversion."

The Church of Uganda, part of the Anglican Communion, is strongly opposed to same-sex unions. In 2005, Archbishop Henry Luke Orombi criticised the Church of England's acceptance of clergy in same-sex civil partnerships. Bishops Stephen Kaziimba and Stanley Ntagali expressed support for the Anti-Homosexuality Act, 2023. In 2013, Ntagali disapproved of the Church of England's decision to allow clergy in civil partnerships to become bishops. He said, "It is very discouraging to hear that the Church of England, which once brought the Gospel of Jesus Christ to Uganda, has taken such a significant step away from that very gospel that brought life, light, and hope to us." In 2023, Kaziimba criticized the Church of England's decision to allow clergy to bless same-sex civil marriages. Subsequently, the Church of Uganda co-signed a statement that it would "no longer [be] able to recognize" the Archbishop of Canterbury as the leader of the Anglican Communion. The Presbyterian Church in Uganda and the Baptist Union of Uganda also oppose same-sex unions.

== See also ==
- LGBT rights in Uganda
- Recognition of same-sex unions in Africa
