= Recognition of same-sex unions in Africa =

Same-sex sexual activity legal Same-sex marriage Limited recognition (foreign residency rights) No recognition of same-sex couples Same-sex sexual activity illegal Prison but not enforced Prison Death penalty on books but not enforced Enforced death penalty

Countries performing civil unions in Africa Gender-neutral civil unions. Civil unions never performed.

Debate has occurred throughout Africa over proposals to legalize same-sex marriage as well as civil unions.

Currently, South Africa is the only African country that performs and recognises same-sex marriage, and Namibia is the only other which legally recognizes same-sex marriages performed abroad. In addition, the Spanish regions of the Canary Islands, Ceuta and Melilla, as well as the Portuguese territory of Madeira, the French départements of Mayotte and Réunion and the British Overseas Territory of St. Helena, Ascension and Tristan da Cunha recognize and perform same-sex marriage.

Civil partnerships or de facto unions are also recognized in South Africa, and the French, Spanish and Portuguese territories.

== Current situation ==
=== National level ===
Status	Country	Legal since	Country population (Last Census count)
Marriage (1 country)	South Africa	2006	54,956,900
Subtotal	—	—	54,956,900 (4.5% of the African population)
Recognition of foreign marriage (1 country)	Namibia	2023	2,113,077
Subtotal	—	—	2,113,077 (0.17% of the African population)
Subtotal	—	—	57,069,977 (4.67% of the African population)
No recognition (44 countries) * same-sex sexual activity illegal
No recognition (44 countries) * same-sex sexual activity illegal	Algeria *	—	40,400,000
No recognition (44 countries) * same-sex sexual activity illegal	Angola	—	25,789,024
No recognition (44 countries) * same-sex sexual activity illegal	Benin	—	10,872,298
No recognition (44 countries) * same-sex sexual activity illegal	Botswana	—	2,250,260
No recognition (44 countries) * same-sex sexual activity illegal	Cameroon *	—	23,439,189
No recognition (44 countries) * same-sex sexual activity illegal	Cape Verde	—	539,560
No recognition (44 countries) * same-sex sexual activity illegal	Central African Republic	—	4,594,621
No recognition (44 countries) * same-sex sexual activity illegal	Chad *	—	13,670,084
No recognition (44 countries) * same-sex sexual activity illegal	Comoros *	—	795,601
No recognition (44 countries) * same-sex sexual activity illegal	Djibouti	—	942,333
No recognition (44 countries) * same-sex sexual activity illegal	Egypt *	—	96,474,100
No recognition (44 countries) * same-sex sexual activity illegal	Equatorial Guinea	—	1,221,490
No recognition (44 countries) * same-sex sexual activity illegal	Eritrea *	—	4,954,645
No recognition (44 countries) * same-sex sexual activity illegal	Eswatini *	—	1,343,098
No recognition (44 countries) * same-sex sexual activity illegal	Ethiopia *	—	102,403,196
No recognition (44 countries) * same-sex sexual activity illegal	(The Gambia) Gambia *	—	2,051,363
No recognition (44 countries) * same-sex sexual activity illegal	Ghana *	—	27,043,093
No recognition (44 countries) * same-sex sexual activity illegal	Guinea *	—	12,395,924
No recognition (44 countries) * same-sex sexual activity illegal	Guinea-Bissau	—	1,815,698
No recognition (44 countries) * same-sex sexual activity illegal	Ivory Coast	—	23,740,424
No recognition (44 countries) * same-sex sexual activity illegal	Lesotho	—	2,203,821
No recognition (44 countries) * same-sex sexual activity illegal	Liberia *	—	4,503,000
No recognition (44 countries) * same-sex sexual activity illegal	Libya *	—	6,293,253
No recognition (44 countries) * same-sex sexual activity illegal	Madagascar	—	24,894,551
No recognition (44 countries) * same-sex sexual activity illegal	Malawi *	—	18,091,575
No recognition (44 countries) * same-sex sexual activity illegal	Mauritania *	—	4,301,018
No recognition (44 countries) * same-sex sexual activity illegal	Mauritius	—	1,262,132
No recognition (44 countries) * same-sex sexual activity illegal	Morocco *	—	33,848,242
No recognition (44 countries) * same-sex sexual activity illegal	Mozambique	—	28,829,476
No recognition (44 countries) * same-sex sexual activity illegal	Niger *	—	20,672,987
No recognition (44 countries) * same-sex sexual activity illegal	Nigeria *	—	185,989,640
No recognition (44 countries) * same-sex sexual activity illegal	Republic of the Congo	—	5,125,821
No recognition (44 countries) * same-sex sexual activity illegal	São Tomé and Príncipe	—	199,910
No recognition (44 countries) * same-sex sexual activity illegal	Senegal *	—	15,411,614
No recognition (44 countries) * same-sex sexual activity illegal	Seychelles	—	94,228
No recognition (44 countries) * same-sex sexual activity illegal	Sierra Leone *	—	7,075,641
No recognition (44 countries) * same-sex sexual activity illegal	Somalia *	—	14,317,996
No recognition (44 countries) * same-sex sexual activity illegal	South Sudan *	—	12,230,730
No recognition (44 countries) * same-sex sexual activity illegal	Tanzania *	—	55,572,201
No recognition (44 countries) * same-sex sexual activity illegal	Togo *	—	7,965,055
No recognition (44 countries) * same-sex sexual activity illegal	Tunisia *	—	11,304,482
No recognition (44 countries) * same-sex sexual activity illegal	Zambia *	—	16,591,390
Subtotal	—	—	873,514,764 (70% of the African population)
Constitutional ban on marriage (10 countries) * same-sex sexual activity illegal	Burkina Faso *	—	20,107,509
Constitutional ban on marriage (10 countries) * same-sex sexual activity illegal	Burundi *	2005	10,524,117
Constitutional ban on marriage (10 countries) * same-sex sexual activity illegal	Democratic Republic of the Congo	2006	78,736,153
Constitutional ban on marriage (10 countries) * same-sex sexual activity illegal	Gabon	2024	1,979,786
Constitutional ban on marriage (10 countries) * same-sex sexual activity illegal	Kenya *	2010	49,125,325
Constitutional ban on marriage (10 countries) * same-sex sexual activity illegal	Mali *	2023	14,517,176
Constitutional ban on marriage (10 countries) * same-sex sexual activity illegal	Rwanda	2003	11,262,564
Constitutional ban on marriage (10 countries) * same-sex sexual activity illegal	Sudan *	—	39,578,828
Constitutional ban on marriage (10 countries) * same-sex sexual activity illegal	Uganda *	2005	41,487,965
Constitutional ban on marriage (10 countries) * same-sex sexual activity illegal	Zimbabwe *	2013	16,150,362
Subtotal	—	—	283,469,785 (23% of the African population)
Total	—	—	1,214,062,706 (99.6% of the African population)

=== Partially recognized and unrecognized states ===
Status	Country	Since	State population (last estimate)
No recognition (2 state) * same-sex sexual activity illegal	Sahrawi Arab Democratic Republic *	—	100,000
No recognition (2 state) * same-sex sexual activity illegal	Somaliland *	—	3,508,180
Subtotal	—	—	3,608,180 (0.3% of the African population)
Total	—	—	3,608,180 (0.3% of the African population)

=== Sub-national level ===
Status	Country	Jurisdiction	Legal since	Jurisdiction population (last census)
Marriage (9 jurisdictions)	France	French Southern and Antarctic Lands	2013	—
Marriage (9 jurisdictions)	France	Mayotte	2013	256,518
Marriage (9 jurisdictions)	France	Réunion	2013	865,826
Marriage (9 jurisdictions)	Portugal	Madeira	2010	289,000
Marriage (9 jurisdictions)	Spain	Canary Islands	2005	2,101,924
Marriage (9 jurisdictions)	Spain	Ceuta	2005	82,376
Marriage (9 jurisdictions)	Spain	Melilla	2005	78,476
Marriage (9 jurisdictions)	United Kingdom	Saint Helena, Ascension and Tristan da Cunha	2017	5,633
Subtotal	—	—	—	3,679,753 (0.3% of the African population)
Total	—	—	—	3,679,753 (0.3% of the African population)

== Public opinion ==
Indicates the country/territory has legalised same-sex marriage nationwide
Indicates that same-sex marriage is legal in certain parts of the country
Indicates that the country has civil unions or registered partnerships
Indicates that same-sex sexual activity is illegal

Opinion polls for same-sex marriage by country
Country	Pollster	Year	For	Against	Neutral (Note: Also comprises: Don't know; No answer; Other; Refused.)	Margin of error	Source
Kenya	Pew Research Center	2023	9%	90%	1%	±3.6%	
Mozambique (3 cities)	Lambda	2017	28% (32%)	60% (68%)	12%		
Nigeria	Pew Research Center	2023	2%	97%	1%	±3.6%	
South Africa	Ipsos	2023	57%	29% [10% support some rights]	14%	±3.5% (Note: [+ more urban/educated than representative])	

== See also ==
- LGBTQ rights in Africa
- Recognition of same-sex unions in the Americas
- Recognition of same-sex unions in Asia
- Recognition of same-sex unions in Europe
- Recognition of same-sex unions in Oceania
