= Iris Angola Association =

LGBTQ+ organization

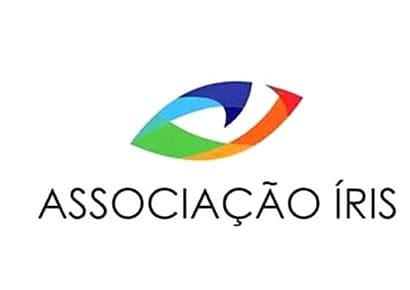
- Formation: 2013
- Founded: 2013
- Founder: Carlos Anderson Henriques Fernandes
- Type: Non-governmental organization
- Headquarters: Luanda
- Region served: Angola
- General Director: Austin Gil
- Website: https://irisangola.com/

Iris Angola Association (Portuguese: Associação Íris Angola) is the first legally registered LGBTI non-governmental organization in Angola. The organization was founded in 2013, received a certificate from the Ministry of Justice and Human Rights of Angola in 2016, and became legally registered in 2018.

The organization focuses on healthcare and human rights advocacy. Iris Angola advocated for revisions to Angola's penal code to decriminalize homosexuality; revisions that both legalized same-sex sexual conduct and outlawed discrimination on the basis of sexual orientation were made in 2019 and came into effect in 2021. The organization is headquartered in Luanda with offices in Benguela and Lubango.

== History ==
A group that advertised gay parties in Luanda called As Divas became involved with Population Services International (PSI) after they requested to hand out condoms at one of the parties. This opened communications between the two groups who went on to have discussions with Lambda (a Mozambican LGBTQ+ organization) and UNAIDS about HIV prevention in Angola's LGBTQ+ community. Together they decided to form the first LGBTQ+ organization in Angola. In 2013, the LGBTQ organization was conceived with the objective "to contribute to a future in which sexual minorities have space, voice, participation and rights in Angolan society." UNAIDS offered 8 thousand dollars to help start the organization under the working title GRACO14 (later changed to Iris Angola Association).

UNAIDS withdrew the offer after new leadership was less confident in the initiative. Carlos Fernandes, a founding member of Iris Angola, helped with Iris' HIV project aimed towards men who have sex with men. He agreed to help on the condition that Iris Angola's promotional material aimed towards the LGBT community would be done in partnership with PSI.

Two years after its creation, Iris Angola partnered with a government agency called the Instituto Nacional de Luta Contra a Sida (National Institute for the Fight Against AIDS in English). Iris Angola requested official legal recognition at the end of 2015. The organization received a certificate from the Ministry of Justice and Human Rights of Angola in 2016. According to an interview with Fernandes, there were a couple years of financial issues making the required notary process difficult. In 2018, Iris Angola became the first legally registered LGBT+ non-governmental organization in the country. Being legally recognized made the organization eligible to receive international financial aid going forward.

== Activities ==
Iris Angola is a gay rights lobbying group. It provides support through human rights advocacy as well as the prevention, treatment and care for HIV.

The organization has counselors do internships at hospitals where they educate medical staff on how to best serve LGBT patients; the counselors also serve as liaisons between patients and hospital workers. The goal is to prevent stigma and discrimination in healthcare. These counselors have worked at 5 public hospitals as of 2015. Other health-related services include mobile clinics, HIV screening, and lectures about HIV and AIDS.

Alongside other groups like UNAIDS, Iris Angola advocated for the eventual removal of Angola's penal code criminalizing same-sex sexual relationships; in 2019, the penal code was revised to outlaw discrimination based on sexual orientation and legalize homosexuality. The revision was signed by Angola's president in 2020 and came into effect in February 2021. The strategy to accomplish this was targeting policy makers rather than sparking public debate. As one member of Iris Angola said, "We did not take the issue to a public debate because our society suffers greatly from cultural prejudices. It would not have worked."

Director Carlos Fernandes participated in a Facebook live event with the U.S. embassy in 2021. With the support of the United Nations Development Program (UNDP), Iris Angola launched a photo exhibition called "See Beyond Your Prejudice" in 2022.

Iris Angola organized the first Miss Trans Angola pageant in 2024. That year, it also argued in for the inclusion on a sexual orientation questionnaire on the country's census.

In June 2025, Director Austin Gil spoke at the opening of FESTIRIS, Angola's LGBTQ culture festival. He discussed how the enactment of the new penal code has done little to combat the institutional discrimination against the LGBTQ+ community, such as police ignoring or mishandling reported assaults and incidents of discrimination. The second Miss Trans Angola pageant was held in September 2025.

== Funding ==
Iris Angola receives support from UNDP's SCALE initiative, a 2 year partnership program offering 1 million USD in grants to African organizations targeting populations vulnerable to HIV. UNDP also provides small grants for Iris Angola's support towards the Network for AIDS Service Organization. These grants funded Iris Angola's development of a 4 year plan, training on stigma and discrimination, and services targeted towards HIV vulnerable populations. Other sources of funding include USAID, PEPFAR (President's Emergency Plan for AIDS Relief), Global Fund, and the Dutch government.
