= Recognition of same-sex unions in Lesotho =

Lesotho does not recognise same-sex marriages or civil unions. The Marriage Act, 1974 does not provide for the recognition of same-sex unions.

== Legal history ==
The Marriage Act (Act 10 of 1974; Sotho: Molao wa Lenyalo) does not expressly forbid same-sex marriages and does not explicitly define marriage as being between "a man and a woman". However, it generally refers to married spouses as being of the opposite sex. Customary marriages entered into according to Sotho custom are also recognised in Lesotho. Historically, married women in Lesotho were considered "legal minors" during the lifetime of their husbands, were severely restricted in economic activities, were unable to enter into legally binding contracts without their husbands' consent, and had no legal standing in civil court. This changed with the passage of the Legal Capacity of Married Persons Act (Act 9 of 2006), which was approved by the Parliament of Lesotho in November 2006.

In 2019, the Transformation Resource Centre (TRC), an organisation advocating for justice, peace and participatory development, called on the government to legalise same-sex marriage and adoption by same-sex couples. "There is no legislative framework for protection of the rights of [LGBT] people and other sexual minorities. This omission leads to discrimination of various forms including denial of access to healthcare services, targeted assaults by the police, non-recognition of their unions as lawful marriages and their prohibition to adopt children", according to a 2019 TRC report. The report also noted that many LGBT people were being forced into heterosexual marriages. That same year, Director of Gender Matau Futho Letsatsi, working for the Ministry of Gender and Youth, Sports and Recreation, acknowledged that there was no law allowing same-sex marriage in Lesotho. In 2022, High Court Chief Justice Sakoane Sakoane said the judiciary would be a "key role player" in ensuring equal rights for LGBT people in Lesotho, "In this Kingdom of Lesotho, the [LGBT] community factually exists as part of society. […] There is no local jurisprudence yet on what these rights mean for the [LGBT] community, even though the Constitution guarantees two important rights: the right to respect for private and family life (in section 11) and freedom from discrimination (in section 18)." The Constitution of Lesotho does not expressly address same-sex marriage, but forbids discrimination on various grounds—but not sexual orientation—and states that every person shall be entitled to equal protection under the law. Article 40 of the Constitution grants foreign nationals who have married a Lesotho citizen citizenship after 5 years of cohabitation in Lesotho.

== Historical and customary recognition ==
Same-sex sexual activity legal Same-sex marriage Limited recognition (foreign residency rights) No recognition of same-sex couples Same-sex sexual activity illegal Prison but not enforced Prison Death penalty on books but not enforced Enforced death penalty

Historically, Sotho society recognised motswalle relationships formed between women during adolescence. Often, a motswalle relationship was acknowledged publicly with a ritual feast and with the community fully aware of the women's commitment to one another. Motswalle relationships differed from same-sex marriages in the way they are commonly defined in Western legal systems. Women in motswalle relationships "marr[ied] men and conform[ed], or appear[ed] to conform, to gender expectations", and did not have a different social identity even though they were in committed relationships with other women. Women in motswalle relationships also differed from the Western perspective of heterosexual female friends. Researcher William J. Spurlin wrote that "it is important not to simply translate into English [the] use of the Sesotho word motswalle [...] as lesbian." Nevertheless, Spurlin stated that "it might be possible to place motswalle relationships on the lesbian continuum to discuss, debate, and imagine them theoretically as possible sites of lesbian existence, given the close emotional and intimate bonds between the women, but with the stipulation that the relationships not be reduced to Western understandings of lesbian." As Lesotho became more modernized, it became exposed to Western culture and homophobia, erasing the motswalle relationships.

In 1941, an official enquiry found that Basotho men were "enthusiastically participating" in bokonchana relationships, also known as "mine marriages" between men, as well as public cross-dressing and same-sex marriage ceremonies.

== Religious performance ==
The Anglican Church of Southern Africa, which has one diocese in Lesotho, does not permit same-sex marriages. Its marriage policies state that "holy matrimony is the lifelong and exclusive union between one man and one woman". In 2016, the synod voted against blessing same-sex unions. The decision split the Church, with several dioceses deciding to nonetheless proceed with the blessing of same-sex relationships, notably the Diocese of Saldanha Bay in South Africa. Archbishop Thabo Makgoba expressed disappointment with the decision not to bless same-sex unions, but added that "all is not lost", expressing hope that the matter would be debated again in the future. Former Archbishop Njongonkulu Ndungane also expressed his disappointment with the decision. In 2022, Bishop Vicentia Kgabe signed a statement expressing support for the inclusion of LGBT people in the Anglican Communion. In early 2023, the Church once again refused to allow its clergy to bless same-sex unions, but directed the synod to develop "guidelines for providing pastoral ministry to those in same-sex relationships". In May 2024, Archbishop Makgoba released a document recommending prayers for same-sex couples, which the synod rejected in September 2024. In September 2026, the Church again rejected a motion relating to a proposed "ministry of inclusion" for parishioners in same-sex relationships.

In 2020, the Methodist Church of Southern Africa voted to allow members, including ordained clergy, to enter into same-sex unions, while retaining the denomination's teaching that marriage is a union "between a man and a woman".

== Public opinion ==
No opinion polls have gauged public support for same-sex marriage in Lesotho. However, same-sex marriage being legal in South Africa, which exercises social, political and cultural influence on Lesotho, awareness of same-sex relationships has "increased".

== See also ==
- LGBT rights in Lesotho
- Recognition of same-sex unions in Africa
- Same-sex marriage in South Africa
