= Recognition of same-sex unions in Egypt =

Egypt does not recognize same-sex marriages or civil unions. Although same-sex unions may have existed in Ancient Egypt, current religious and family laws do not permit marriages between people of the same sex.

== Background ==
The Constitution of Egypt does not expressly forbid same-sex marriage. Article 10 of the Constitution states: "Family is the basis of society and is based on religion, morality, and patriotism. The state protects its cohesion and stability, and the consolidation of its values." Personal and family law in Egypt (e.g. the laws concerning marriage, divorce and inheritance) are governed by the religious law of the individual. As the religious laws of all officially recognized religions in Egypt—predominantly Islam and Coptic Orthodox Christianity—do not view same-sex relationships as legitimate, Egyptian law only recognizes marriages between a man and a woman. Civil unions (Arabic: اتحاد مدني, ittiḥād madaniyy, pronounced [it.tiˈħaːd ˈmadanij.j]) providing same-sex couples with some of the rights and benefits of marriage are not recognized in Egypt.

In December 2014, an appeals court reduced sentences given to eight men accused of hosting a same-sex marriage from three year's imprisonment to one year. The men were charged on "inciting debauchery and offending public morality", after a video was posted to YouTube in September 2014 showing two of the men exchanging rings on a boat on the Nile. "Medical tests" were ordered for those individuals arrested.

== Historical and customary recognition ==
Same-sex sexual activity legal Same-sex marriage Limited recognition (foreign residency rights) No recognition of same-sex couples Same-sex sexual activity illegal Prison but not enforced Prison Death penalty on books but not enforced Enforced death penalty

=== Ancient Egypt ===
According to common interpretations of the Torah, Leviticus 18:3 alludes to the practice that Ancient Egypt permitted two women or two men to marry each other. The best known case of possible homosexuality in Ancient Egypt is that of the two high officials Khnumhotep and Niankhkhnum. Both men lived and served under Pharaoh Nyuserre Ini during the Fifth Dynasty. Khnumhotep and Niankhkhnum each had families of their own with children and wives, but when they died their families apparently decided to bury them together in the same mastaba tomb. In this mastaba, several paintings depict both men embracing each other and touching their faces nose-on-nose. These depictions leave plenty of room for speculation, because in Ancient Egypt the nose-on-nose touching normally represented a kiss. In other pictures, Khnumhotep occupies the position usually designated for a wife, leading to speculations that the men had a romantic relationship.

Egyptologists and historians disagree about how to interpret the paintings of Khnumhotep and Niankhkhnum. Some scholars believe that the paintings reflect an example of homosexuality between two married men and prove that the ancient Egyptians accepted same-sex relationships. Other scholars disagree and interpret the scenes as evidence that Khnumhotep and Niankhkhnum were twins, even possibly conjoined twins. It remains unclear what exact view the ancient Egyptians fostered about homosexuality and same-sex unions. The tomb inscription of Khnumhotep and Niankhkhnum may suggest that homosexuality was accepted, and ancient Egyptian documents never clearly state that same-sex relationships were seen as reprehensible or despicable. Thus, it was very likely tolerated, as there has never been proof suggesting otherwise.

=== Siwa Oasis ===
The Siwa Oasis, located in the far-western parts of the country between the Qattara Depression and the Great Sand Sea, is of special interest to anthropologists because of its historical acceptance of male homosexuality and rituals celebrating same-sex marriages. German egyptologist Georg Steindorff explored the Siwa Oasis in 1900 and reported that homosexual relations were common and often extended to a form of marriage (Siwi: ⴰⵄⵕⵓⵙ, áʕṛus): "The feast of marrying a boy was celebrated with great pomp, and the money paid for a boy sometimes amounted to fifteen pounds, while the money paid for a woman was a little over one pound." Mahmud Mohammad Abd Allah, writing of Siwan customs for the Peabody Museum of Archaeology and Ethnology in 1917, commented that although Siwan men could take up to four wives, "Siwan customs allow a man but one boy to whom he is bound by a stringent code of obligations." In the late 1940s, a Siwan merchant told visiting British novelist Robin Maugham that the Siwan women were "badly neglected", but that Siwan men "will kill each other for [a] boy. Never for a woman", although as Maugham noted, these marriages had become illegal by then. These unions involved the pairing of adolescent boys and unmarried adult men, who worked as agricultural laborers and belonged to a warrior caste protecting the Oasis from desert marauders. Among the warrior caste, these same-sex relationships were formally recognized when the man offered the boy's father a gift as in a heterosexual marriage.

Egyptian archaeologist Ahmed Fakhry, who studied the Siwi people, observed in 1973 that "while the Siwans were still living inside their walled town, none of these bachelors was allowed to spend the night in the town and had to sleep outside the gates...Under such circumstances it is not surprising that homosexuality was common among them....Up to the year 1928, it was not unusual that some kind of written agreement, which was sometimes called a marriage contract, was made between two males; but since the visit of King Fuad I of Egypt to this oasis it has been completely forbidden...However, such agreements continued, but in great secrecy, and without the actual writing, until the end of World War II. Now the practice is not followed."

== See also ==
- LGBT rights in Egypt
- Recognition of same-sex unions in Africa
