= LGBTQ rights in Mozambique =

- Mozambique
- Legal status: Legal since 2015
- Gender identity: No
- Military: No
- Discrimination protections: Some protections based on sexual orientation and gender identity.

Family rights
- Recognition of relationships: No
- Adoption: No

Lesbian, gay, bisexual, transgender, and queer (LGBTQ) rights in Mozambique have improved in the 21st century, although LGBTQ people continue to face legal challenges not faced by non-LGBTQ people. Same-sex sexual activity became legal in Mozambique under the new Criminal Code that took effect in June 2015. Discrimination based on sexual orientation in employment was illegal from 2007 to 2024. The new Penal Code, enacted in 2020, provides explicit protections for LGBTQ people, banning hate crimes and hate speech.

Mozambique, along with other former Portuguese colonies, is one of the most LGBTQ-friendly African nations. Polls have found moderate levels of support for LGBTQ rights and same-sex marriage. Nevertheless, same-sex couples are unable to marry or adopt, and LGBTQ people still face discrimination and prejudice.

== Legality of same-sex sexual activity ==
Until the enactment of the new Criminal Code, the legal status of same-sex sexual activity was ambiguous in Mozambique. In March 2011, the Minister of Justice declared during the UN Human Rights Council's Universal Periodic Review that homosexuality is not an offence in Mozambique. However, the Criminal Code did contain an offence of "practices against nature". According to the ILGA, Articles 70 and 71(4°) provided for the imposition of security measures on people who habitually practiced "acts against nature". The security measures included a bond of "good behaviour", being put on probation for a certain period, or even internment in a workhouse or agricultural colony (from six months to three years).

In December 2014, President Armando Guebuza signed the new Criminal Code, which does not contain any provisions regarding same-sex sexual activity, into law. It was published in the country's official journal on 31 December 2014 and took effect 180 days later (i.e. 30 June 2015).

== Recognition of same-sex relationships ==
Mozambique does not provide any form of recognition of same-sex relationships, though protests for same-sex marriage and common-law marriage have been ongoing since 2006.

== Discrimination protections ==
There are no legal protections against discrimination based on sexual orientation or gender identity in areas such as education, health, housing and employment. Employment protections that had been in place since 2007 were repealed in 2024. However, the new Penal Code (Law 24/2019) enacted in 2020, provides some protections for LGBTQ people banning hate crimes and hate speech.

Legal protections in place are the following:

- Article 160 (Aggravated Homicide) of the Penal Code (2020) protects the victim's sexual orientation or gender identity.
- Article 191 of the Penal Code (2020) bans incitement to discrimination, hatred, or violence against a person or group of people based on their gender identity. It also bans defamation, insults, and threats against transgender people.
- Article 6.2(d) of the Advertising Code (2016) bans advertising if it contains discrimination or harassment based on sexual orientation.
- Article 30(c) states that advertising for employment and opportunities must not contain restrictions based on gender, marital status, political orientation, sexual orientation, place of origin, race, or religion.

The new Labor Law (No. 13/2023), which repealed Law No. 23/2007, does not provide explicit protections for LGBTQ people. It came into effect in February 2024. Previously, article 4 of the 23/2007 Labour Law (Portuguese: Lei 23/2007 de Lei de Trabalho) provided for "non-discrimination on grounds of sexual orientation, race or HIV/AIDS status". Article 5 of the law granted employees a right to privacy, relating to "the private and personal lives of employees, such as their family lives, personal relationships, sex lives, state of health and their political and religious convictions." Article 108 of the law provided that "all employees, whether nationals or foreigners, without distinction based on sex, sexual orientation, ... have the right to receive a wage and to enjoy equal benefits for equal work".

In line with most other former Portuguese African colonies, Mozambique is reported to be one of the most tolerant countries in Africa towards gays and lesbians. While the Government has reported fairly little on LGBTQ rights, all of what has been said has been positive. It is one of the only few countries in Africa to offer any form of discrimination protections for LGBTQ people.

== Public opinion ==
A September 2013 survey of people in the cities of Maputo, Beira and Nampula found moderate levels of support for the legal recognition of same-sex couples and parenting rights:

	Maputo	Beira	Nampula
Same rights for same-sex and opposite-sex couples	42.7%	32.0%	47.2%
Same-sex marriage	37.0%	17.9%	28.2%
Same-sex adoption	49.5%	40.2%	44.9%

A 2016 Afrobarometer opinion poll found that 56% of Mozambicans would welcome or would not be bothered by having a homosexual neighbor. Mozambique was one of the only four countries polled with a majority in favor. (the others being Cape Verde (74%), South Africa (67%) and Namibia (55%))

According to a 2017 poll carried out by ILGA, 61% of Mozambicans agreed that gay, lesbian and bisexual people should enjoy the same rights as straight people, while 23% disagreed. Additionally, 66% agreed that they should be protected from workplace discrimination. 32% of Mozambicans, however, said that people who are in same-sex relationships should be charged as criminals, while a plurality of 43% disagreed. As for transgender people, 66% agreed that they should have the same rights, 68% believed they should be protected from employment discrimination and 55% believed they should be allowed to change their legal gender.

A 2017 survey of people in the cities of Maputo, Beira and Nampula again found moderate levels of support for LGBTQ rights. Support for same-sex marriage increased in all three cities to 47% in Maputo, 38% in Beira and 42% in Nampula. Support for same-sex adoption was 33% in Maputo, 43% in Beira and 42% in Nampula. In addition, the survey also found that 85% opposed violence against LGBTQ people and would come to help them if they were being physically assaulted. However, most respondents said they would not accept their child if he/she came out (with 28% of Beira respondents stating they would assault their child if he/she was gay). 37.5% would react negatively if a co-worker came out, while 37.9% would accept them and 20.6% would be indifferent. Furthermore, about one-third stated that they personally knew an openly LGBTQ person, and two-thirds said they would not want a gay president.

== Living conditions ==
Hate crimes and violence directed at the LGBTQ community are rare in Mozambique, unlike in some other African countries. However, discrimination is not unheard of.

A notable figure to have spoken out in support of LGBTQ rights in Mozambique and the rest of Africa is former President Joaquim Chissano who also spoke to other African leaders to stop laws that impede on LGBTQ rights in Africa.

=== NGO registration ===
Lambda Mozambique, a local civil society organization advocating on issues of sexual and gender rights, has requested to register as a non-governmental organization since 2008. A process which usually lasts six weeks. In 2010, after being ignored by the Ministry of Justice for two years, the group took their case to the United Nations, appealing to the High Commission for Human Rights to act on the violation of their right to association. The UN Human Rights Council had been calling on Mozambique to register Lambda since 2011.

In October 2017, the Constitutional Council of Mozambique declared that Article 1 of Law No. 8/91 (which allowed the registration of associations in the country in accordance with the principles of "moral order") was unconstitutional. The reference to "moral order" was deemed incompatible with article 53(3) of the Mozambican Constitution of 2004, which only forbids the registration of military associations or those that promote violence, racism or xenophobia.

== Summary table ==
Same-sex sexual activity legal	Yes (Since 2015)
Equal age of consent	Yes (Since 2015)
Anti-discrimination laws in employment	No (from 2007 to 2024)
Anti-discrimination laws in the provision of goods and services	No
Anti-discrimination laws in all other areas (incl. indirect discrimination)	No
Hate crimes law including sexual orientation and gender identity	Yes (Since 2020)
Hate speech law including sexual orientation and gender identity	Yes (Since 2020 only for gender identity; since 2016 sexual orientation protected only in advertising)
Same-sex marriage	No
Recognition of same-sex couples	No
Stepchild adoption by same-sex couples	No
Joint adoption by same-sex couples	No
LGBTQ people allowed to serve openly in the military	Yes (Since 2015)
Right to change legal gender	No
Access to IVF for lesbians	No
Commercial surrogacy for gay male couples	No
MSMs allowed to donate blood	Yes There are no known restrictions or bans on blood donations from men who have sex with men

== See also ==
- LGBTQ rights in Africa
- LGBTQ rights in the Commonwealth of Nations
- Human rights in Africa
