= LGBTQ rights in Angola =

- Angola
- Legal status: Legal since 2021
- Gender identity: No
- Discrimination protections: Yes, for sexual orientation

Family rights
- Recognition of relationships: No
- Adoption: No

Lesbian, gay, bisexual, transgender, and queer (LGBTQ) rights in Angola have seen improvements in the early 21st century. In November 2020, the National Assembly approved a new penal code, which legalised consenting same-sex sexual activity. Additionally, employment discrimination on the basis of sexual orientation has been banned, making Angola one of the few African countries to have such protections for LGBTQ people.

Some NGOs in Angola, that are involved in HIV/AIDS education, are beginning to work with the LGBT community. Additionally, two specific LGBT groups operate in Angola. Only one of these groups, Iris Angola Association, has received official and legal recognition.

== Laws regarding sexual activity ==
The region known today as Angola and the modern country has a somewhat complicated history with homosexuality. This is due to the long period of occupation by independent African tribes followed by the influence of Christianity brought to the region by the Portuguese Empire. Prior to the 2020 decriminalisation, the previous legal code allowed penalties of up to 3 years in labor camps or jail for same-sex sexual activity.

=== Pre-colonial attitudes among ethnic groups ===
In the 1920s, a German anthropologist named Kurt Falk published his research on African ethnic groups, which included some acceptance of homosexuality and bisexuality. Falk reported that homosexual and cross-dressing practices were commonplace among the Ovimbundu people. Ovimbundu men who behave, act and dress as women are known as chibadi or chibanda, and historically would marry other men. Similar individuals exist in neighbouring ethnic groups; they are known as kimbanda among the Ambundu, quimbanda among the Kongo and jimbandaa among the Lovale people. Same-sex sexual acts were regarded as having medical effects in these societies. Indeed, such acts were viewed as a remedy for impotence, to improve soil fertility or as a transfer of knowledge. Sexual practices between men were also part of initiation rituals.

In the 18th century, the Khoikhoi people recognised the terms koetsire, which refers to a man who is sexually receptive to another man, and soregus, which refers to same-sex masturbation usually among friends. Anal intercourse and sexual relations between women also occurred, though more rarely.

Among the Herero people, erotic friendships (known as oupanga) between two people, regardless of sex, were common, and typically included anal intercourse (okutunduka vanena).

=== Portuguese Angola ===
With the formation and expansion of Portuguese Angola came the expansion of Christianity into the region and therefore the Christian morality that strongly condemned homosexual acts. It was eventually decriminalized in 1852, but was re-criminalized in 1886 with Articles 70 and 71 of the Penal Code of 1886 that contained a vaguely worded prohibition against public immorality and acts considered "against nature". This would remain the legal status for the rest of Portuguese Angola's existence and was not repealed upon Angolan independence in 1975.

=== Legalisation ===
In February 2017, the Angolan Parliament preliminarily approved a draft of a new penal code in a unanimous 125–0 vote with 36 abstentions. The new Penal Code does not contain provisions outlawing same-sex sexual activity in private. A final vote on the bill was planned for 28 June 2017, but was postponed, due to controversy surrounding abortion (the Penal Code would have legalised abortions in the case of rape). Multiple public debates and consultations were held, though same-sex sexual activity was hardly, if ever, an issue. On 18 May 2018, the Parliament approved the draft in a second vote by a 186–3 vote with six abstentions. It was approved in its final vote on 23 January 2019. After the President João Lourenço vetoed some provisions of the new Code and demanded tougher anti-corruption measures, the National Assembly approved a revised version of the new Penal Code (Law 38/20) on 4 November 2020. The president signed the reform into law on 6 November 2020 along with the new Code of Criminal Procedure (Law 39/20) which also replaced a 1929 Portuguese code and was approved by the Assembly on 22 July 2020. The laws were published on 11 November 2020 and took effect after ninety days, i.e. on 9 February 2021.

== Recognition of same-sex relationships ==
There is no legal recognition of same-sex couples in Angola.

In general, significant social pressure is put on people to marry a suitable partner of the opposite sex and have children.

In 2005, the unofficial commitment ceremony of a same-sex couple was treated as "shameless" and "abominable" in the national news magazines.

== Discrimination protections ==
The General Labour Law (7/15) (Portuguese: Lei Geral do Trabalho (Lei nº 7/2015)), which came into effect on 15 September 2015, prohibits employment discrimination on the basis of, inter alia, sexual orientation.

Article 214 of the new Penal Code forbids discrimination based on sexual orientation in employment and the provision of goods and services. Additionally, multiple other articles, including articles 71, 172, 215, 216, 225, 382 and 384, outlaw incitement to hatred, hate speech, defamation and hate crimes motivated by sexual orientation with varying degrees of punishment. For instance, article 172 bans threats against someone or a group of people on account of their sexual orientation, among others, with 1-year imprisonment and a fine. The punishment for death threats is doubled. Article 384 lists persecution on the basis of sexual orientation as a crime against humanity, on par with slavery, willful manslaughter, genocide, rape, forced mutilation and others.

=== Constitutional rights ===
LGBT citizens were not expressly mentioned in the previous Constitution, ratified in 1992. The new Constitution of 2010 does make some general provisions concerning human rights, freedom, equality and tolerance that may apply to all citizens, irrespective of sexual orientation or gender identity. For example, the Constitution stipulates that the State will work to secure equal rights and opportunities for all citizens, irrespective of, among other things, "any other form of discrimination".

== Gender identity and expression ==
One of the most popular musical artists in Angola is transgender woman Titica, a singer of a popular rap-techno fusion music style known as kuduro. Named the "best kuduro artist of 2011", she has performed at various music festivals around the world. However, she still suffers frequent harassment in Angola, most of which are carried out based on religion.

There is no specific law which allows transgender people in Angola to change their gender marker on their official documents and passports. Section 78 of the Código do Registo Civil 2015 indicates that, in general, there should be no alteration of details entered into the registration records. However, section 87 gives the Civil Registrar general authority to make changes, including changes of name and when there is a change of facts which alter the legal identity and status of the person. Transgender people could possibly use this section to change their legal gender.

== Living conditions ==
Prevailing social attitudes about sexual orientation tend to reflect traditional Catholic and Protestant values concerning human sexuality and gender roles. These values and mores do shape public policy.

The Human Rights Measurement Initiative collects survey data on civil and political rights by asking human rights experts in each country to share their knowledge with us. 17% of human rights experts surveyed in the 2022 HRMI survey identified LGBTQIA+ people as being at risk of having the right to freedom from torture and ill-treatment violated. 7% of human rights experts surveyed identified LGBTQIA+ people as being at risk of having the right to assembly and association violated.

Some LGBT people in Angola have reported being harassed by people who believe that they are immoral. Yet, signs of more liberal attitudes do exist.

=== Political parties and non-governmental organizations ===
The three major political parties have not formally addressed LGBT in their respective party platforms. On the rare occasion that politicians and other government officials have dealt with LGBT people or rights, their policies have reflected prevailing attitudes.

In 2010, the Angolan Government refused to receive openly gay Isi Yanouka as the new Israeli ambassador, allegedly due to his sexual orientation.

The Government does allow for non-governmental organizations (NGOs) to exist in Angola, and some charities have begun to work with members of the LGBT community with regards to HIV/AIDS education.

Two specific LGBT groups work in Angola. One of these groups, Iris Angola, received official and legal recognition by the Angolan Justice Ministry in June 2018. At the time, Iris Angola had about 200 members. It is based in Luanda and has offices in Benguela and Lubango.

=== HIV/AIDS ===
Legally, people living with HIV/AIDS in Angola are entitled to health care services and protection from employment discrimination.

Efforts to develop educational programs specifically for LGBT people have struggled to receive funding from NGOs. The first association, Acção Humana (Human Action), was launched in 2006 but has been unable to receive funding. In 2007, a study on HIV/AIDS estimated that roughly five percent of HIV infections are from men who have sex with other men.

An HIV/AIDS educational program for LGBT in Angola is just beginning to develop, through the work of NGOs, such as the Population Services International.

== Public opinion ==
LGBTQ+ issues tend not to garner public debate outside of social media. For instance, the penal code revision was divisive among religious groups, but they did not publicly rebuke it. LGBTQ+ topics tend to be represented in popular media rather than politics. For example, major popstar Titica is a transgender woman and the telenovela Windeck includes a lesbian couple. In 2015 when another telenovela, Jikulumessu, showed two men kissing, it caused backlash that resulted in the show being taken off air for 3 days; however, it also prompted positive social media responses including from the son of Eduardo dos Santos, the president of Angola at the time.

The Christian Angolan culture is heteronormative and cisnormative, viewing homosexuality as unnatural. Religious spaces often dehumanize and discriminate against LGBTQ+ people. Of the country's religious groups, Catholics have shown the most tolerance.

According to a 2017 poll carried out by ILGA, 61% of Angolans agreed that gay, lesbian and bisexual people should enjoy the same rights as straight people, while 20% disagreed. Additionally, 65% agreed that they should be protected from workplace discrimination. 27% of Angolans, however, said that people who are in same-sex relationships should be charged as criminals, while a plurality of 48% disagreed. As for transgender people, 63% agreed that they should have the same rights, 72% believed they should be protected from employment discrimination and 49% believed they should be allowed to change their legal gender.

== Summary table ==
| Right | Legal status |
|---|---|
| Same-sex sexual activity legal | Yes (Since 2021) |
| Equal age of consent | Yes (Since 2021) |
| Anti-discrimination laws in employment only | Yes (Since 2015) |
| Anti-discrimination laws in the provision of goods and services | Yes (Since 2021) |
| Anti-discrimination laws in all other areas (Incl. indirect discrimination, hate speech) | Yes (Since 2021) |
| Hate crime laws include sexual orientation | Yes (Since 2021) |
| Same-sex marriage | No |
| Recognition of same-sex couples (e.g. unregistered cohabitation, life partnership) | No |
| Adoption by single people regardless of sexual orientation | Yes |
| Stepchild adoption by same-sex couples | No |
| Joint adoption by same-sex couples | No |
| LGBT people allowed to serve openly in the military | |
| Right to change legal gender | No ( May possibly change gender under the Código do Registo Civil 2015, section 87 gives the Civil Registrar general authority to make changes, including changes of name and when there is a change of facts which alter the legal identity and status of the person. Transgender people could possibly use this section to change their legal gender.) |
| Access to IVF for lesbians | No |
| Conversion therapy banned | No |
| Commercial surrogacy for gay male couples | No |
| MSMs allowed to donate blood | No |

== See also ==
- Human rights in Angola
- Politics of Angola
- LGBT rights in Africa
