= Chibados =

Ndongo gender identity

Chibados (or quimbandas) are third-gender people, born male, who lived most often as women. They were found among the cultures of the Ndongo and other parts of what is today Angola. They were first described in the west by the Portuguese.

Chibados were involved as "spiritual arbiters in political and military decisions" and also performed burials. Olfert Dapper described the chibados as shamans "who walk dressed like women." Portuguese priests and Jesuits described how chibados lived as women and were able to marry other men with no social sanctions. Instead, "such marriages were honored and even prized." Chibados made up a separate caste and elders referred to themselves as "Grandmother."

Queen Nzinga of Ndongo and Matamba had over fifty chibados in her court. The chibados were said to be used by Nzinga as concubines.

As the Portuguese gained more control in Africa, colonial laws introduced and increased homophobia.
