= Dutch Reformed Church in Namibia =

Protestant Christian denomination in Namibia

- Nederduitse Gereformeerde Kerk in Namibië
- Classification: Protestant
- Orientation: Reformed
- Polity: Presbyterian
- Moderator: Schalk Pienaar
- Associations: Synod of the Dutch Reformed Church in South Africa (NGK)
- Region: Namibia
- Origin: 1957
- Congregations: 44
- Members: 22,500
- Official website: www.ngkn.com.na

The Dutch Reformed Church in Namibia (DRCN; Afrikaans: Nederduitse Gereformeerde Kerk in Namibië) is a Christian denomination in Namibia. It is one of ten synods of the Dutch Reformed Church in South Africa (NGK), and the only one outside South Africa. It covers all of Namibia except for the Eastern Caprivi Strip.

The Dutch Reformed Church in South Africa began mission work in Namaqualand in the 1880s, and the first congregation in German South West Africa was established in 1898. The DRCN became an autonomous entity in 1957, when it held its first synod.

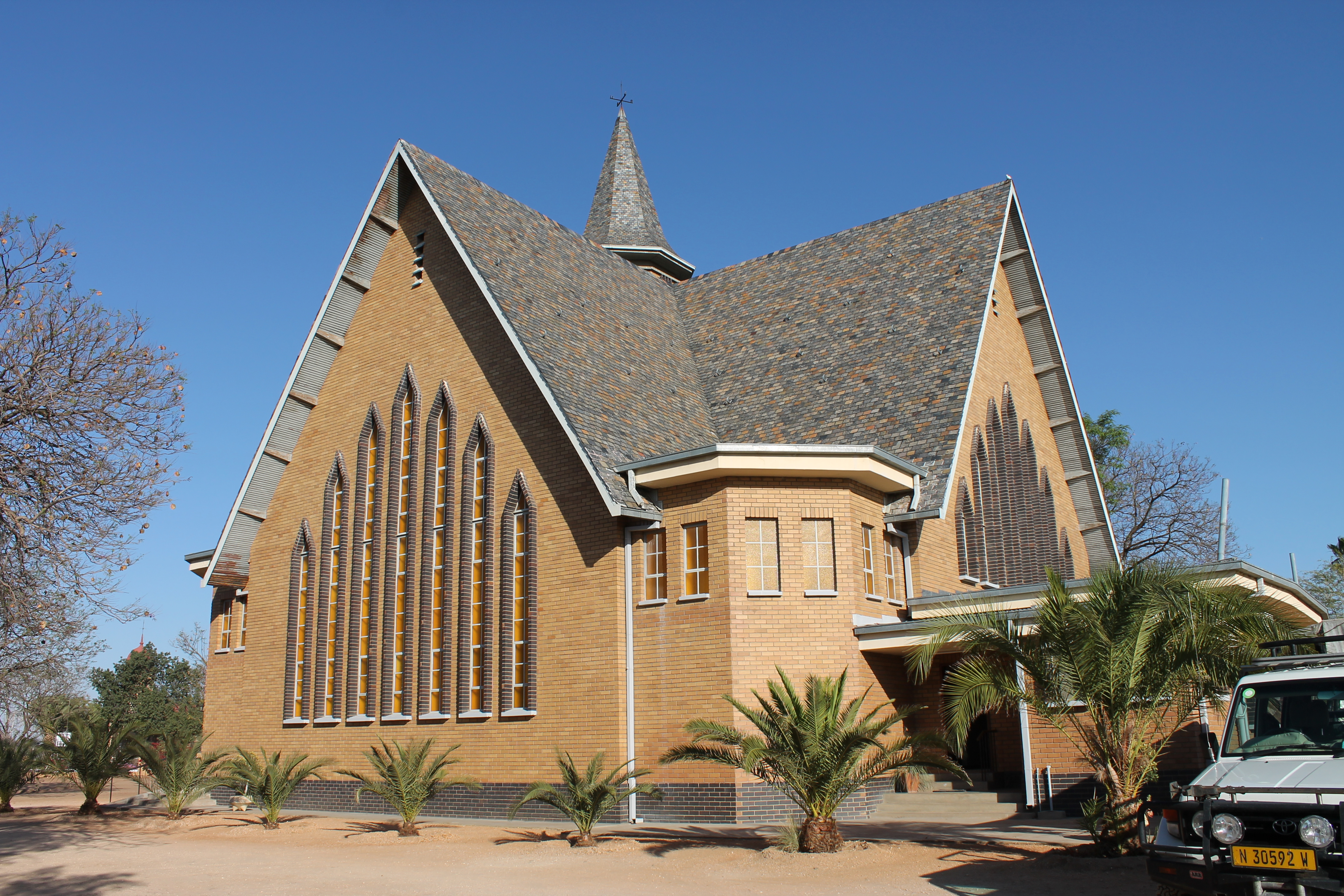
The Dutch Reformed Church in Otjiwarongo.

The DRCN has 44 congregations, 22500 members (including children) and 60 pastors. The moderator is Schalk Pienaar, and the general secretary is Clem Marais.

The DRCN has been a full member of the Council of Churches in Namibia since 2000.

As a synod of the NGK, the DRCN adheres to the Ecumenical creeds (the Apostles' Creed the Nicene Creed, and the Athanasian Creed) and the Three Forms of Unity (the Belgic Confession, the Heidelberg Catechism, and the Canons of Dort). The General Synod of the NGK stipulates things such as Bible translations, liturgical forms and hymnals.

In 2015, the NGK voted to recognise same-sex unions. This decision did not extend to the DRCN, since Namibia does not recognise same-sex relationships. The General Synod also resolved to ordain LGBT clergy, and to remove the requirement for them to be celibate. The DRCN continues to hold to the celibacy requirement, and has stated that they "undertake to admit theological candidates who have a same-gender sexual orientation and who live celibate to the ministry."
