= Constitution of Mozambique =

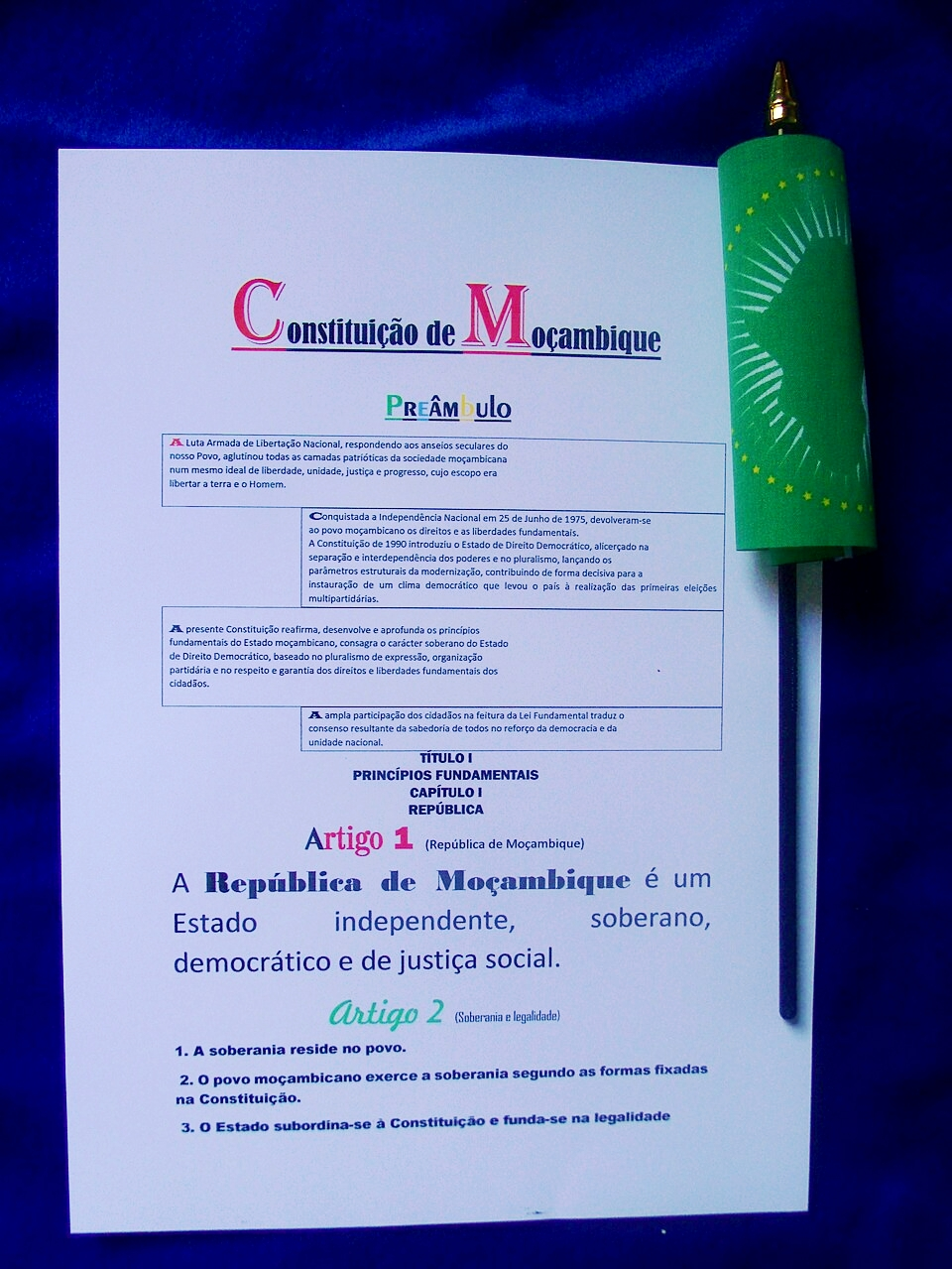
Photo of Article 1 of the Constitution of Mozambique

The Constitution of Mozambique is the basic law governing Mozambique. The current constitution was adopted on November 16, 2004, and came into effect January 21, 2005. It has received several amendments since then, with the most recent being in 2023.

== History ==
Mozambique adopted multiple constitutions since the end of Portuguese colonial rule. In 1975, a constitution established after Mozambican War of Independence. Under this constitution, FRELIMO (Front for the Liberation of Mozambique) ruled Mozambique as a one-party Marxist autocracy. The Mozambican National Resistance (RENAMO) rebelled against FRELIMO in the Mozambican Civil War. RENAMO wanted the country to become democratic and free-market. During the final years of the civil war, the 1990 constitution was created; it established a multi-party government with free elections and a market economy. It also expanded the rights of citizens by banning the death penalty and permitting the right to strike and freedom of movement.

The 1990 constitution was succeeded by another constitution adopted 2004 and enacted in January 2005. This constitution created the Constitutional Council to ensure compliance with the new constitution and an Ombudsman to protect the rights of citizens by reviewing complaints and investigating. It also added the Council of State to advise the President of the Republic, this advisory body includes the Ombudsman, the Prime Minister, the President of the Constitutional Council, the previous Presidents of the Republic, the former President (speaker) of the Assembly of the Republic, seven council members elected by the Assembly of the Republic, four appointees chosen by the President of the Republic, and the runner up for President of the Republic in the elections.

== Amendments ==
In 2007, an amendment was passed to postpone the provincial elections which originally had to be held no later than January 2008. The deadline was changed due to repeated delays including the appointment of new members to the National Election Commission as well as the rainy season being expected to hinder voter turnout. The provincial assembly vote was held in October 2009.

Further amendments were made in 2018 to decentralize provincial and district government entities. Provincial governors would be chosen by an indirect election rather than continue to be appointed by the President of the Republic. District administrators, previously appointed by the Minister of State Administration, could be indirectly elected as well. Karl Kössler describes the system as the leading party for the provincial, district, or municipal assembly becoming the governor, district administrator, or mayor respectively.

In 2023, a draft amendment was submitted so that election for district assembly no longer had to be held by 2024 per the previous amendments. It passed in August, and the opposition party, RENAMO, disputed it since there was no referendum about the amendment. While the constitution puts forth the idea of holding a referendum on major constitutional changes, one has not been held since the start of the multi-party system. One of FRELIMO's reasons for getting rid of the deadline is that having elections by 2024 is expected to cost 46 billion meticais, or about 720 million United States dollars. Another reason is that the role of the district assembly is unclear since the relationship between the district and provincial assemblies was not laid out in the 2018 amendments. Since provinces consist of several districts, FRELIMO says that district assemblies could make provincial assemblies irrelevant.

== Human rights ==
Mozambique's constitution lays out several rights for its people. These rights include freedom of expression, including for press members; freedom of association, such as joining trade unions or protests; freedom to defend one's public image and protect one's privacy; and freedom from arbitrary arrest with the ability to dispute arrests and detentions in court. The constitution also lays out a right to life, including freedom from torture, inhumane treatment, or the death penalty. These rights have not been applied consistently. For instance, there have been reports of arbitrary arrests and detention of peaceful protestors during counter operations against the Islamist insurgency in the province of Cabo Delgado. Unlawful killings by the military and the police have also occurred in the province. Those linked with ISIS-Mozambique have been tortured. Journalists in Mozambique face intimidation and police violence.

Constitutional rights are meant to be applied equally. According to Article 35 of the Constitution of the Republic of Mozambique, "All citizens shall be equal before the law, shall enjoy the same rights and shall be subject to the same duties, regardless of the colour, race, sex, ethnic origin, place of birth, religion, level of education, social position, marital status of their parent, profession and their political preference." Articles 36 and 37 establish gender-based equality and full rights for disabled people respectively.
