= Lambda (Mozambican organization) =

LGBTQ+ organization

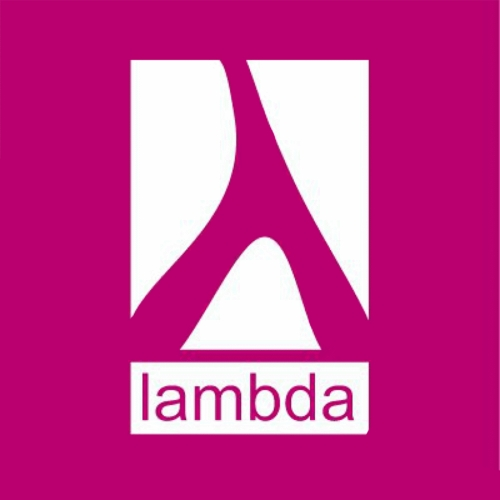
- Formation: 2006
- Type: Non-governmental organization
- Headquarters: Maputo
- Region served: Mozambique
- Executive Director: Danilo da Silva
- Website: https://lambda.org.mz/

Lambda (often written as LAMBDA, also called the Mozambican Association for the Defense of Sexual Minorities) is an organization that promotes LGBTQI rights through advocacy, public awareness, and education. The organization was created in 2006 and is Mozambique's first LGBTQ+ rights organization. The organization's main office is in Maputo with regional offices in Beira and Nampula.

== History ==
Lambda was created in 2006 and organized by the Mozambican Human Rights League. Lambda first applied for legal recognition as a civil society organization in 2008. In 2009, the Ministry of Justice advised Lambda to revise its application. The revised submission received no response. After repeated applications, the Ministry of Justice has yet to register the organization.

According to activists, the government informally communicated that Lambda's applications violated a clause in the 1991 Law on Associations; the clause forbids registering organizations that are counter "to the moral, social, and economic order of the country and offend the rights of others or the public good."

In 2010, Lambda appealed to the United Nations' High Commission for Human Rights for support. Since 2011, the United Nations Council on Human Rights has been calling for the Mozambican government to register Lambda. Human Rights Watch Africa Division Researcher Zenaida Machado has called the government's treatment of Lambda discriminatory. Machado goes on to say "The failure to register Lambda in this arbitrary manner is a clear violation of their right to association, guaranteed under Mozambique’s constitution and in international law."

In 2013, Lambda appealed its application to the Ombudsman Jose Abudo and Mozambique's Human Rights Commission. The appeals received no response. In 2014, Lambda purchased a full page advertisement in the Maputo daily paper; the advertising space was used to protest the government's perceived discriminatory treatment.

In October 2017, the Constitutional Council of Mozambique ruled that the clause in the 1991 Law on Associations was unconstitutional. This created hope that Lambda may be registered in the future. Following the Constitutional Council's decision, Lamba continued with a case it filed to the Administrative Tribunal. In June of 2021, the Administrative Tribunal said it no record of Lambda's requestd for registration. They added that the Mozambican Bar Association, who filed on Lambda's behalf, did not have legal standing to continue with the case.

== Health initiatives ==
Lambda provides training for medical and mental health professionals. Lambda offered a free course in human psychology and sexuality which ten professionals completed. In partnership with the Ministry of Women, Lambda provided a workshop and pamphlets about health in same-sex relationships. Lambda also provides free psychosocial support for LGBTQ people and their family members, including support groups in multiple provinces.

ICAP mobile units provide free health services at Lambda's office including HIV testing, PReP (pre-exposure prophylactic for HIV), HIV viral load testing, anti-retrovirals, tuberculosis prevention, condoms, psychosocial support and screening and treatment for sexually transmitted infections.

From 2017 to 2019, Lambda worked alongside other groups including Frontline AIDS, GAP Health, and the Mozabican Association for Family Development to run the Deep Engagement program. The program provided rapid HIV testing by trained LGBT HIV counselors as well as clinical outreach via mobile clinics. The program worked with local healthcare facilities and organizations to increase their care capacity and provide LGBTQ-friendly service. The program also provided LGBTQ+ safe spaces and advocated for government accountability in providing high-quality healthcare for the LGBTQ+ population.

== Other advocacy efforts ==
Lambda partnered with the organization Women and Law in Southern Africa (WLSA) to provide training workshops to law enforcement. Lambda also helped revise the country's police manual to include sexual orientation and gender identity issues. Lambda served as a technical working group for Mozambique's Ministry of Health and discussed the discrimination faced by the gay community. Lambda also advocated alongside feminist groups like the WSLA and the Movement of Young Feminists to legalize abortion and homosexual sex in 2014 and 2015 respectively.

Lambda holds gay parties and other LGBTQ+ events which it advertises via WhatsApp, email, and text. The organization has one of the most visited Mozambican Facebook pages. Lambda publishes an academic journal called The Colours of Love which releases new volumes once every three months in the nation-wide paper Savana. Lambda publishes monthly articles in the national newspapers Zambeze and Canal de Mocambique. The organization also started a radio station called "Purple Coffee" and screens LGBTQ+ movies.

Lambda worked with the organizations GALA and Governing Intimacies by providing oral history interviews from their previous project called Testemunhos. GALA and Governing Intimacies translated these interviews into English and saved them to GALA's archives so they would be publicly available to a larger international audience. Lambda assisted GALA in future oral history collection by providing employee interviews and connecting GALA to Mozambique's gay male community.

== Staff, training, and funding ==
Lambda's executive director is Danilo da Silva. In 2017, the organization had 64 activists and community agents across eight cities. Several staff members have received training in intervention mapping from Maastricht University. Human Rights Campaign Global visited in 2015 to provide a two day workshop to improve the organization's campaign planning, networking, and messaging. Lambda is largely funded by the Elton John AIDS Foundation.
