= Fiducia supplicans =

2023 Catholic document on blessings

Fiducia supplicans ("Supplicating Trust") is a 2023 declaration on Catholic doctrine that allows Latin Catholic priests and deacons to bless couples who are not married according to church teaching, including individuals in same-sex relationships. Subtitled "On the Pastoral Meaning of Blessings", the document is dated 18 December 2023 and was released on the same day. Fiducia supplicans was issued by the Holy See's Dicastery for the Doctrine of the Faith (DDF) and approved with a signature by Pope Francis.

It was the first declaration issued by the DDF since Dominus Iesus in 2000.

Fiducia supplicans has been widely interpreted. Francis advised that the Holy See's bureaucrats should avoid "rigid ideological positions" three days after the document was issued. Prefect of the DDF Víctor Manuel Fernández later said in an interview that the declaration did not permit blessing the unions, with a DDF press release in January 2024 repeating this. While most coverage reported that Fiducia supplicans reversed a 2021 responsum ad dubium from the DDF's predecessor, which ruled that the Church does not have the "power to give the blessing to unions of persons of the same sex", other commentators said that the 2021 ruling was still effective. In its introduction, Fiducia supplicans describes itself as "offering new clarifications" on the 2021 responsum.

== Background ==
Before 2021, several dioceses had permitted the blessing of same-sex couples, including Linz in Austria and Basel in Switzerland. On 15 March 2021, the Congregation for the Doctrine of the Faith (renamed the Dicastery for the Doctrine of the Faith in 2022) issued a responsum ad dubium ("response to doubt") that responded in the negative to the question of whether the Church has "the power to give the blessing to unions of persons of the same sex". While most coverage reported that Fiducia supplicans reversed this 2021 decision, other commentators said that the 2021 ruling was still effective. In its introduction, Fiducia supplicans describes itself as "offering new clarifications" on the 2021 responsum.

Notwithstanding the 2021 responsum, several bishops' conferences had moved towards blessings for same-sex unions. In September 2022, over 80% of German bishops at the Synodal Way supported a document calling for a "re-evaluation of homosexuality" and modifying the Catechism of the Catholic Church, and Flemish bishops of the Episcopal Conference of Belgium published a liturgical document for the blessing of same-sex unions. After the Synodal Path, the first German dioceses started blessing ceremonies for same-sex couples in March 2023, including the dioceses of Osnabrück, Essen, Speyer, and Berlin.

On 25 September 2023, in another responsum to conservative cardinals before the 16th World Synod of Bishops, Pope Francis signalled the Church's openness to blessings for gay couples as long as they did not misrepresent the Catholic view of marriage as between one man and one woman.

== Contents ==
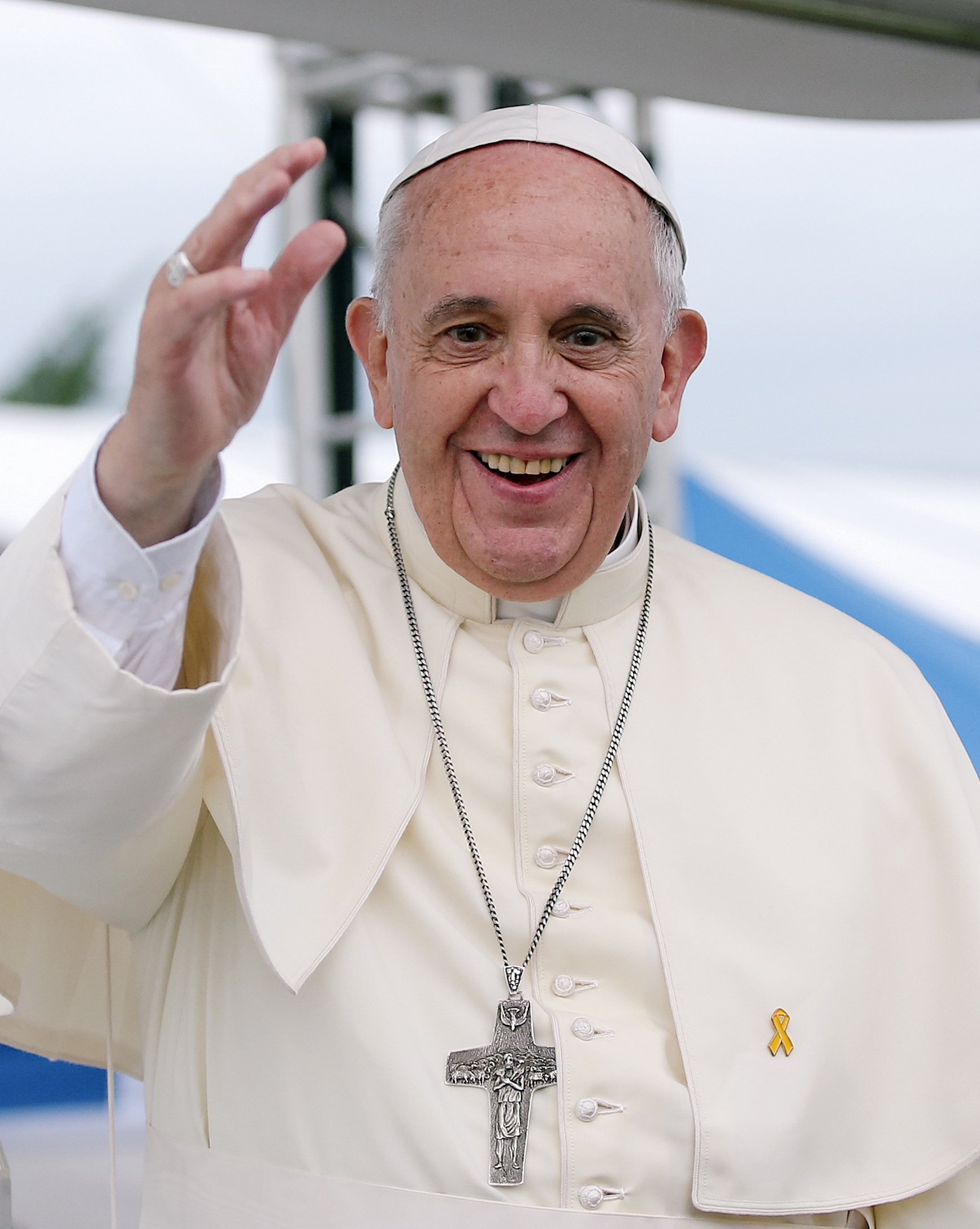
Pope Francis (pictured in 2014) signed the declaration.

Fiducia supplicans provides clarification and reforms on the Catholic Church's treatment of "irregular relationships", that is, those who establish a monogamous and emotional bond that lasts over time and have not contracted a Catholic marriage. Notably, it allows Catholic priests and deacons to perform "spontaneous blessings" of same-sex couples, as well as opposite-sex couples who are not married, and civilly married couples at least one party of which was previously divorced but has not received an annulment.

The document details that this type of informal and spontaneous blessing is neither a sacrament nor a rite of the Catholic Church, so no special ceremony is performed for it. The document maintains that sexual relations are licit only within marriage, so heterosexual couples are urged to marry and not consider this blessing as an alternative to marriage. All extramarital sexual relations are considered to be sinful by the Church and continue to be so, leading to the implication that the nature of the ideal affect existing between two persons in a same-sex relationship is chaste-affection. While the sexual attraction between two people of the same sex cannot be legitimized, it is not a sin according to the sexual morality of the Catholic Church, but homosexual acts are sinful.

Fiducia supplicans does not provide for changes with respect to the institution of marriage in the Catholic Church. Marriage is still understood only as the union between a man and a woman, to the exclusion of all kinds of marriages that are not heterosexual and monogamous, such as same-sex marriage, as well as any kind of heterosexual or bisexual bigamy and polygamy. In a December 2023 interview, Cardinal Víctor Manuel Fernández, the prefect of the DDF, explained that such blessings applied to couples and that "the union is not blessed, for the reasons that the declaration repeatedly explains about the true meaning of Christian marriage and sexual relations".

== Press release ==
On 4 January 2024, the DDF published a press release in response to the reactions that Fiducia supplicans had triggered. The press release maintained support for the document, while attempting to clarify issues surrounding its reception and implementation. The press release summarized the blessings that Fiducia supplicans was intended to permit as "short and simple pastoral blessings (neither liturgical nor ritualized) of couples in irregular situations (but not of their unions)".

Responding to episcopal conferences that restricted the issuing of blessings in their dioceses, the press release said that in some dioceses "it will be necessary not to introduce [blessings], while taking the time necessary for reading and interpretation", recognising the "strong cultural and even legal issues" that allowed bishops' restrictions to be "understood in their contexts". The press release emphasized that "pastoral blessings", which last "about 10 or 15 seconds", "[do] not justify anything that is not morally acceptable". It provided an example of a blessing a priest could use:

Lord, look at these children of yours, grant them health, work, peace and mutual help. Free them from everything that contradicts your Gospel and allow them to live according to your will. Amen.

The press release clarified that blessings "must not take place in a prominent place within a sacred building, or in front of an altar, as this also would create confusion". It suggested some catechesis to "help everyone to understand that these types of blessings are not an endorsement of the life led by those who request them", reiterating that they are "simple expressions of pastoral closeness that do not impose the same requirements as a sacrament or a formal rite" and a priest that imparts such blessings "is not a heretic, he is not ratifying anything nor is he denying Catholic doctrine". The press release said that "this paternal gesture" could not be denied only because it was requested by "a great sinner".

== Reaction ==
=== Supporters ===
Several episcopal conferences supported the blessings in their jurisdictions, including the conferences of Austria, France, Germany, Italy, Malta, Portugal, Spain and Andorra, and Switzerland. In Belgium, Johan Bonny, bishop of Antwerp, praised the decision as "moving towards" future recognition of same-sex sacramental marriage in the Catholic Church. Geert De Kerpel, the spokesperson for the Belgian Catholic Church, stated that it would not have an impact locally, as same-sex unions were already being blessed, but that the declaration would rightfully now apply this situation at an international level. According to Archbishop Franz Lackner of Salzburg, the document basically means that "one can no longer say no" to blessing same-sex unions.

James Martin, an American Jesuit priest, called the declaration "a major step forward in the church's ministry to LGBTQ people" and demonstrated the church affirming same-sex couples' desire "for God's presence and help in their committed and loving relationships". The next day, he blessed a couple who had been married in a non-Catholic church.

In India, Archbishop Oswald Gracias of Bombay – one of Francis's cardinal advisers – expressed that seeking and bestowing blessings is a deeply ingrained custom in India, describing it as a "natural" practice that resonates with the spirituality of the region and deeming it "an affirmation of our spirituality and a gift." While Gracias clarified that the Church's stance on the doctrine of marriage remains unchanged, emphasizing that Fiducia supplicans does not signify a move toward recognizing same-sex unions as sacramental marriages, he highlighted the alignment of Fiducia supplicans with his own pastoral approach toward the LGBTQ+ community. Archbishop Victor Lyngdoh of Shillong, issued a letter to the clergy and followers, reiterating the sentiments of Fiducia supplicans. While he underscored that the blessing should not be misconstrued as the Church's blessings conferred during marriage, he drew on Francis's urging of the faithful to "avoid being 'judges who only deny, reject, and exclude'".

The United States Conference of Catholic Bishops (USCCB) issued a statement saying the declaration made "a distinction between liturgical (sacramental) blessings, and pastoral blessings", and that the declaration affirmed that "[t]he Church's teaching on marriage has not changed". American bishop Robert Barron – who serves as the chairman of the USCCB's Committee on Laity, Marriage, Family Life, and Youth – said the declaration did not demonstrate a change in Catholic doctrine on sexuality and marriage. The Canadian Conference of Catholic Bishops also said that the document affirms church teaching on marriage "explicitly". Danish bishop Czeslaw Kozon said that there was a problem not with the content of the statement "but the way it will be received and interpreted". The president of the Ghana Catholic Bishops' Conference, Bishop Matthew Kwasi Gyamfi said: "What people do not understand is that if a gay couple goes to the priest to bless them, and the pope says yes, you are blessing the people and not the union".

=== Criticism ===
The declaration sparked considerable controversy and criticism among Catholics, including from several conservative commentators, clerical congregations, and high-profile bishops, priests, and lay people. Several episcopal conferences barred the blessings in their jurisdictions or asked priests to refrain from them, including the conferences of Benin, Congo-Brazzaville, Hungary, Malawi, Namibia, Togo, and Zambia. The Polish Episcopal Conference suggested only blessing "individual people living in complete abstinence". On 11 January 2024, Cardinal Fridolin Ambongo Besungu announced that all episcopal conferences in Africa, represented in SECAM, would reject blessings for same-sex couples, stating that "the extra-liturgical blessings proposed in the declaration...cannot be carried out in Africa without exposing themselves to scandals."

Forbidding blessings in the Archdiocese of Mary Most Holy in Astana in Kazakhstan, Archbishop Tomasz Peta and Auxiliary Bishop Athanasius Schneider denounced Fiducia supplicans for contradicting "divine revelation and the uninterrupted, bimillennial doctrine and practice of the Catholic Church". Schneider added that Fiducia supplicans was a "great deception" and warned of "evil that resides in the very permission to bless [...] same-sex couples". German cardinal Gerhard Ludwig Müller said that the declaration was "sacrilegious and blasphemous", and that the Catholic Church "cannot celebrate one thing and teach another". Cardinal Robert Sarah, former prefect of the Congregation for Divine Worship and the Discipline of the Sacraments, called the declaration "a heresy that seriously undermines the Church". Cardinal Joseph Zen criticized parts of the declaration as "an absolute subjective error" and suggested that Fernández should resign.

A Spanish-language petition requesting that the declaration be rescinded led Cardinal José Cobo Cano, Archbishop of Madrid, to threaten disciplinary action against any clergy in his diocese that signs it.

Sviatoslav Shevchuk, the Major Archbishop of Kyiv–Galicia and Primate of the Ukrainian Greek Catholic Church, said that the declaration concerns purely the Latin Church and had no legal force in 23 autonomous Eastern Catholic Churches.

Several figures associated with traditionalist Catholicism rejected the declaration, including excomunicated Archbishop Carlo Maria Viganò, former Apostolic Nuncio to the United States.

=== Christians outside the Catholic Church ===
American evangelist Franklin Graham, and the Southern Baptist Theological Seminary president Albert Mohler were critical. Carl Trueman expressed concern that contemporary conservative Protestants in the West would be less able to shelter under the Roman Catholic Church's cultural umbrella as a result of Fiducia supplicans.

On 20 February 2024, the Synodal Biblical-Theological Commission of the Moscow Patriarchate called Fiducia supplicans an "innovation [that] reflected a sharp departure from Christian moral teaching".

On 7 March 2024, the Holy Synod of the Coptic Orthodox Church published a statement condemning homosexual activity and relationships as contrary to Christian morality, and suspending ecumenical dialogue with the Roman Catholic Church pending review. While the statement did not reference Fiducia supplicans, Catholic publications linked the suspension of ecumenical dialogue to the declaration.

== Aftermath ==
At a closed-door meeting with 800 Roman clergy on 13 January 2024, Francis stated that homosexual individuals could be blessed, but not LGBT organizations. He added the reason why the measure on the blessings of same-sex couples was rejected in Africa was that "[t]he culture [in Africa] does not accept it". He added as a comparison on blessing homosexuals: "When we bless an entrepreneur, we do not ask if he has stolen". The next day, Francis answered questions on Fiducia supplicans in an interview on Che tempo che fa, saying that "the Lord blesses everyone who is capable of being baptised, that is, every person", and that such blessings invite people "to see what the road is that the Lord proposes to them".

On 26 January 2024, addressing the DDF's annual plenary assembly, Francis said that the purpose of the blessings discussed in the document was to "concretely show the closeness of the Lord and the Church to all those who, finding themselves in different situations, ask for help to continue – sometimes to begin – a journey of faith". He emphasised that non-liturgical blessings "do not require moral perfection to be received" and that they are bestowed on the people requesting them, not their union. On 29 January 2024, in an interview with La Stampa, Francis highlighted the "spirit of the declaration" that "aims to include, not divide", in contrast to those that would want to "make a list of sinners who can enter the Church and a list of sinners who cannot be in the Church". Francis said that "those who vehemently protest [the document] belong to small ideological groups", while the church in Africa presented "a special case" because "for them, homosexuality is something 'ugly' from a cultural point of view".

When asked about blessings for homosexual couples, in an interview with 60 Minutes, Pope Francis stated: "What I allowed was not to bless the union, that cannot be done because that is not the sacrament. But to bless each person, yes, the blessing is for everyone."

== See also ==
- Pope Francis bibliography
- Pope Francis and LGBT topics
- Blessing of same-sex unions in Christian churches
- Catholic Church and homosexuality
  - Dissent from Catholic teaching on homosexuality
- Marriage in the Catholic Church
