= Blessing in the Catholic Church =

Type of rite

A Latin Catholic priest performs a blessing on a child during mass at Holy Cross Cathedral, Honiara, Solomon Islands, 2023

In the Catholic Church, a blessing is a rite consisting of a ceremony and prayers performed in the name and with the authority of the Church by a duly qualified minister by which persons or things are sanctified as dedicated to divine service or by which certain marks of divine favour are invoked upon them. The Catechism of the Catholic Church states that "Every baptized person is called to be a 'blessing' and to bless. Hence lay people may preside at certain blessings; the more a blessing concerns ecclesial and sacramental life, the more its administration is reserved to the ordained ministry (bishops, priest, deacons)."

In a wider sense blessing has a variety of meanings in the sacred writings:

- Synonymous with praise; thus the Psalmist, "I will bless the Lord at all times; praise shall be always in my mouth."
- A wish or desire that all good fortune, especially of a spiritual or supernatural kind, may go with the person or thing, as the Psalmist says, "Blessed art thou, and it shall be well with thee".
- The sanctification or dedication of a person or thing to some sacred purpose; e.g., Jesus took bread, said the blessing, broke it....
- A gift, as when Naaman addresses Eliseus: "Now therefore, I pray thee, take a blessing of thy servant".

== The Old Testament ==
On the morning of Creation, God blessed the living creatures that came from His hands, bidding them increase and multiply and fill the earth. When Noah emerged from the Ark, he received God's benediction, which he transmitted through his sons Shem and Japheth to posterity. The Old Testament shows that, in the patriarchal ages, heads of tribe and family seem privileged to bestow blessings, and priests when directed by God, administered it to the people. "Thus shall you bless the children of Israel... and the Lord will turn His countenance and give them peace". The great value attributed to blessings is seen in Rebecca's effort to secure Jacob's blessing for her son. It was regarded as a sure way to secure God's benevolence, peace and protection.

== Types ==
Blessings may be divided into two classes, invocative and constitutive. The former are those in which Divine benignity is invoked to bring some temporal or spiritual good without changing their former condition. Of this kind are the blessings given to adults, to adolescents, and to children, and to articles of food. The latter class permanently depute persons or things to Divine service by imparting to them some sacred character, by which they are held to assume a new and distinct spiritual relationship, conferring a sacredness so that they cannot be divested of their religious character or turned to profane uses. Such are the blessings given churches and chalices by their consecration.

Theologians distinguish blessings of an intermediate sort, by which things are rendered special instruments of salvation without at the same time becoming irrevocably sacred, such as blessed salt, candles, etc.

== Priestly blessing ==
"Blessing" in the liturgical sense, is a rite consisting of a ceremony and prayers performed in the name and with the authority of the Church by a duly qualified minister by which persons or things are sanctified as dedicated to Divine service or by which certain marks of Divine favour are invoked upon them.

The adoption of this rite by Jesus and his followers ensured its adoption at a very early stage in the Church's history. Blessings, in the sense in which they are being considered, are entirely of ecclesiastical institution: the Church has confined their administration to those in sacerdotal orders. Priests are ordained "that whatsoever they bless may be blessed, and whatsoever they consecrate shall be consecrated". In other words, priests can bless anything. The only case in which one inferior to a priest may bless is when the deacon blesses a candle on Holy Saturday, acting as a deputy and employing incense already blessed by the celebrant.

Some blessings are reserved to the Pope, some to bishops and some to parish priests. The first category includes the right to bless the pallium for archbishops, Agnus Deis, the Golden Rose, the Royal Sword and persons to whose blessing an indulgence is attached. He may depute others to give these. To bishops belongs the privilege of blessing abbots at their installation, priests at their ordination and virgins at their consecration; of blessing churches, cemeteries, oratories and all articles for use in connection with the altar, such as chalices, vestments and cloths, as well as military standards, soldiers, arms, and swords, and of imparting all blessings for which Holy Oils are required. Some of these may, on delegation, be performed by inferiors. Of the blessings which priests are generally empowered to grant, some are restricted to those who have external jurisdiction, like rectors or parish priests, and others are the exclusive prerogative of persons belonging to a religious order. An inferior cannot bless a superior or exercise ordinary powers in his presence. The priest, for instance, who is the principal celebrant of a Mass at which a bishop is present but is not the principal celebrant, is still not to give the final blessing without permission from the bishop.

== Efficacy ==
Blessings are not sacraments; they are not of Divine institution; they do not confer sanctifying grace; and they do not produce their effects in virtue of the rite itself. They are sacramentals and, as such, they are held to produce the following specific effects:

- Excitation of pious emotions and affections of the heart and, by means of these, remission of venial sin and of the temporal punishment due to it
- Freedom from power of evil spirits
- Preservation and restoration of bodily health
- Various other benefits, temporal or spiritual

All these effects are not necessarily inherent in any one blessing; some are caused by one formula, and others by another, nor are they infallibly produced. It depends altogether on the Church's suffrages that persons using the things blessed derive supernatural advantages. There is no reason to limit the miraculous interference of God to the early ages of the Church's history, and the Church never accepts these wonderful occurrences unless the evidence in support of their authenticity is absolutely unimpeachable.

Instances are alleged in the lives of the saints where miracles have been wrought by the blessings of holy men and women.

== Liturgy ==
Before a minister gives any blessing he should first satisfy himself that he is qualified, either by his ordinary or delegated powers. For the simple blessings of the Ritual, a soutane, surplice, and stole of the requisite colour will usually be sufficient. A clerk should be at hand to carry the Holy Water or incense if required or to prepare a lighted candle. The blessings are ordinarily given in a church but if necessary they can be administered elsewhere and without any sacred vestment.

The Missal for Mass includes the blessing given at the end of Mass, along with blessings associated with functions incidental to certain days of the year such as the blessing of palms and ashes. However, the Roman Ritual incorporates a resource of ecclesiastical blessings for many purposes and occasions. In the Pontifical are found the blessings that are performed de jure by bishops, such as blessing persons, kings, emperors, and princes at their coronation and the blessings reserved to bishops.

=== Blessing people ===
There is a blessing for the departure and return of pilgrims to the Holy Land, containing prayers and allusions to the Magi's journey, to Abraham setting his face towards the distant land of Canaan and to the Angel companion of the younger Tobias before an appeal to God to send solace on the journey, shade from heat, shelter in storms and a haven of safety.

There follow blessings of persons with Holy Water before Mass, an adult who is sick, a number of sick people, a woman on the approach of confinement and another after childbirth, infants, children, teenagers, and adults come to the use of reason or arrived at years of discretion, children and adults on their presentation in Church, that they may lead good Christian lives and for boys and girls on the Feast of the Holy Infancy that they may grow up to imitate the virtues of the Saviour and reach salvation under His guidance.

=== Blessings for things ===
The Catholic Church holds that things used in daily life, particularly in the service of religion, should be rescued from evil influences and endowed with a potency for good. The principal liturgical blessings recognized and sanctioned by Church are contained in the Roman Ritual and the Pontifical.

- In addition to blessings for articles destined for the altar, the Roman Ritual has formulae for blessing crosses, images of Jesus, Mary and the saints, church organs, processional banners, new bells for church uses and for other purposes, dress and cinctures worn in honour of the saints, monstrances, reliquaries, vessels for Holy Oils, church ornaments, clerical habits, medals, pictures, crosses for the Stations, rosaries, water, candles, the Trisagion of the Holy Trinity, various scapulars. Most receive an "indulgenced" blessing, by which the pious employment and use of them may gain an indulgence.
- There are benedictions for; paschal lamb, eggs, oil, wine, lard, cheese, butter, dripping, salt, and water used as antidote to rabies as well as the fruits of the earth, seeds that are put into the earth, wine and the vintage, herbs and grasses: all may be "sanctified by the word of God and prayer".
- Animals may have blessings invoked upon them in order that their usefulness may be increased. Birds, beasts, bees, horses and oxen broken to the yoke and other beasts of burden are included in the formularies. The Creator is invoked to grant to the brute strength, health and protection from sickness or plague.
- The Ritual has blessings for houses and schools and for the laying of their foundation stones; for stables and every other building of any description for which no special formula is at hand. There is also a special blessing for the bridal chamber.
- Inanimate objects which serve society may receive a blessing, such as new ships, railways, trains and carriages, bridges, fountains, wells, cornmills, lime-kilns, smelting-furnaces, telegraphs, steam engines, emergency vehicles and generators.

== Sources ==
- New American Bible, United States Conference of Catholic Bishops, Washington, DC, 2002
- Catechism of the Catholic Church, 2nd ed., USCC, Inc., 1997
