= LGBTQ rights in La Francophonie =

In much of the Organisation internationale de la Francophonie, including former colonies of France, same-sex sexual activity is not considered a criminal offense. This is due, in part, to the lack of existing anti-homosexuality laws at the time of French rule. However, in most of the member states, including those states in which same-sex sexual activity is not criminalized, social taboos against it remain. In a small minority of member states, same-sex couples are allowed the ability to register civil unions or marriages.

Based on a report by Global Philanthropy Project (GPP) and Égides, between 2013 and 2020, there was a total of $27 million funding to Francophone nations for LGBTI. There were 1,002 LBGTI grants given to Francophone nations. 24 Francophone nations received funding that focused on LGBTI. The average grant amount was $27,175.

== Protections by Member State ==
Note: † Signed UN General Assembly declaration in favour of LGBT rights. ‡ Signed alternative Statement against LGBT rights.

| State | Marriage | Statement in support of LGBT rights | LGBT sexual activity legal |
|---|---|---|---|
| Belgium | Yes | Yes † | Yes |
| Canada | Yes | Yes † | Yes |
| France | Yes | Yes † | Yes |
| Luxembourg | Yes | Yes † | Yes |
| Switzerland | Yes | Yes † | Yes |
| Andorra | Yes | Yes † | Yes |
| Greece | Yes | Yes † | Yes |
| Monaco | No (Cohabitation Agreement) | Yes † | Yes |
| Cambodia | No (Limited Recognition) | No | Yes |
| Cape Verde | No | Yes † | Yes |
| Seychelles | No | Yes † | Yes |
| Albania | No | Yes † | Yes |
| Bulgaria | No | Yes † | Yes |
| Moldova | No | Yes † | Yes |
| North Macedonia | No | Yes † | Yes |
| Romania | No | Yes † | Yes |
| Benin | No | No ‡ | Yes |
| Central African Republic | No | Yes † | Yes |
| Democratic Republic of the Congo | No | No | Yes |
| Djibouti | No | No ‡ | Yes |
| Gabon | No | Yes † | Yes |
| Guinea-Bissau | No | Yes † | Yes |
| Republic of the Congo | No | No | Yes |
| Ivory Coast | No | No ‡ | Yes |
| Madagascar | No | No | Yes |
| Rwanda | No | Yes † | Yes |
| São Tomé and Príncipe | No | Yes † | Yes |
| Haiti | No | No | Yes |
| Laos | No | No | Yes |
| Vietnam | No | Yes † | Yes |
| Armenia | No | Yes † | Yes |
| Vanuatu | No | Yes † | Yes |
| Burkina Faso | No | No | No |
| Burundi | No | No | No |
| Cameroon | No | No ‡ | No |
| Chad | No | No ‡ | No |
| Comoros | No | No ‡ | No |
| Egypt | No | No ‡ | No |
| Guinea | No | No ‡ | No |
| Mali | No | No ‡ | No |
| Mauritania | No | No ‡ | No / No |
| Morocco | No | No ‡ | No |
| Niger | No | No ‡ | No |
| Senegal | No | No ‡ | No |
| Tunisia | No | No ‡ | No |
| Lebanon | No | No | No |
| Togo | No | No ‡ | No |
| Dominica | No | Yes † | Yes |
| Mauritius | No | Yes † | Yes |
| Saint Lucia | No | No ‡ | Yes |

== See also ==
- LGBTQ rights in the Commonwealth of Nations
