= LGBTQ rights in Africa =

- Same-sex marriage Limited foreign recognition (residency rights) Homosexuality legal but no recognition Prison but unenforced Punishable by prison Death penalty but unenforced Enforced death penalty
- Legal status: Legal in 21 out of 54 countries; equal age of consent in 17 out of 54 countries Legal, with an equal age of consent, in all 8 territories
- Gender identity: Legal in 4 out of 54 countries Legal in 7 out of 8 territories
- Military: Allowed to serve openly in 2 out of 54 countries Allowed in all 8 territories
- Discrimination protections: Protected in 11 out of 54 countries Protected in all 8 territories

Family rights
- Recognition of relationships: Recognized in 1 out of 54 countries Recognized in all 8 territories
- Restrictions: Same-sex marriage constitutionally banned in 13 out of 54 countries
- Adoption: Legal in 1 out of 54 countries Legal in all 8 territories

Lesbian, gay, bisexual, transgender, and queer (LGBTQ) rights in Africa are generally lacking, especially in comparison to much of the Americas, Europe and Oceania. (Note: As of 2025, South Africa, Namibia, Cape Verde, Mauritius, Seychelles, Angola, Botswana, Mozambique, São Tomé and Príncipe, Lesotho, and Equatorial Guinea have stronger protections for LGBTQ people.) There are an estimated fifty million Africans who are non-heterosexual.

As of June 2026, homosexuality is outlawed in 33 of the 54 African states recognised by the United Nations. In Eswatini, Ghana, Sierra Leone, and Zimbabwe, only male homosexuality is criminalised. In Egypt, despite no law explicitly criminalising homosexual acts, the state uses several morality provisions for the de facto criminalization of homosexual conduct.

According to the Human Rights Watch, in some countries whilst homosexuality itself is not illegal, there are discriminatory laws specifically targeting homosexual acts. In former British colonies, including Kenya and Nigeria, laws criminalising homosexuality are typically traceable to the colonial era. In states where homosexuality is legal, there is often little to no discrimination protection for homosexuals in areas such as employment.

In southern Somalia, Somaliland, Mauritania, northern Nigeria, and Uganda (in aggravated cases), homosexuality is punishable by death. In Gambia, Sudan, Sierra Leone, Tanzania, Uganda, and Zambia, offenders can receive life imprisonment for homosexual acts - although this is not enforced in Sierra Leone.

Homosexuality has never been criminalised in Benin, Central African Republic, Djibouti, Côte d'Ivoire, the Democratic Republic of the Congo, the Republic of the Congo, Equatorial Guinea, Madagascar, and Rwanda. It has been decriminalised in Angola, Botswana, Cape Verde, Gabon, Guinea-Bissau, Lesotho, Mauritius, Mozambique, Namibia, São Tomé and Príncipe, Seychelles, and South Africa. However, in four of these countries (Gabon, Côte d'Ivoire, Republic of the Congo, and Madagascar), the age of consent is higher for same-sex sexual relations than for opposite-sex ones. Since June 2024, Namibia is the most recent country in Africa to decriminalise homosexuality.

In November 2006, South Africa became the first country in Africa and the fifth country in the world to legalise same-sex marriage. In May 2023, the Supreme Court of Namibia ruled foreign same-sex marriages must be recognised equally to heterosexual marriages. This ruling was overturned in December 2024, when a new act was signed into law which explicitly forbid same-sex marriages and the recognition of those performed abroad. Spanish, Portuguese, British, and French overseas territories in Africa have legalised same-sex marriage.

LGBTQ anti-discrimination laws exist in eleven African countries: Angola, Botswana, Cape Verde, Equatorial Guinea, Lesotho, Mauritius, Mozambique, Namibia, São Tomé and Príncipe, Seychelles, and South Africa. Botswana, Mauritius, and South Africa are the only countries in Africa in which discrimination against the LGBTQ community is constitutionally illegal. In other countries, there are limited discrimination protections.

Travel advisories encourage gay and lesbian travelers to use discretion in much of the continent to ensure their safety. This includes avoiding public displays of affection (although this can often apply to both homosexual and heterosexual couples).

== Recent developments ==
In a 2011 UN General Assembly declaration for LGBTQ rights, nation states were given a chance to express their support, opposition, or abstention on the topic. Only Cape Verde, Central African Republic, Gabon, Guinea-Bissau, Mauritius, Rwanda, São Tomé and Príncipe, Seychelles, Sierra Leone, and South Africa expressed their support. A majority of African countries expressed their opposition. State parties that expressed abstention were Angola, Botswana, Burkina Faso, Burundi, Democratic Republic of the Congo, Equatorial Guinea, Ghana, Lesotho, Liberia, Madagascar, Mozambique, Namibia, Republic of the Congo, and Zambia.

In 2006, South Africa became the first country in Africa and the fifth in the world to legalise same-sex marriage. There are large LGBTQ communities in South Africa's urban areas, including Johannesburg, Cape Town, Durban, Pretoria, Port Elizabeth, East London, Bloemfontein, Nelspruit, Pietermaritzburg, Kimberley, and George. South Africa's three largest cities, Johannesburg, Durban, and Cape Town, are frequently promoted as tourist destinations for LGBTQ people. However social discrimination against LGBTQ people in South Africa does still occur, especially in rural areas where it is fueled by a number of religious figures and traditions.

While South Africa is often perceived as the most supportive African country for LGBTQ rights, nations like Namibia, Cape Verde, Mauritius, Seychelles, Angola, Botswana, Mozambique, São Tomé and Príncipe, Lesotho, and Equatorial Guinea are also recognized for their social acceptance and tolerance of LGBTQ people and having discrimination protections.

In 2010, a cisgender man, Steven Monjeza Soko, and a transgender woman, Tiwonge Chimbalanga Kachepa, were arrested by the Malawi police and charged following their engagement ceremony, despite no evidence of the two having sex. The court denied bail, sentencing both Soko and Kachepa to prison.

Nicholas Hersh reports that LGBTQ asylum-seekers and refugees in Morocco often fear for their lives. Queer Moroccan Refugees have been subject to social discrimination and violence, including rape and imprisonment. Queer Moroccan Refugees who have been outed in their communities may experience poverty, frequently turning to sex work in exchange for housing.

In recent years, although many countries have made progress with decriminalization, some countries in which homosexuality is illegal have introduced harsher penalties. In addition to criminalizing homosexuality, Nigeria has recently enacted legislation prohibiting the support of LGBTQ rights. According to Nigerian law, a heterosexual ally "who administers, witnesses, abets or aids" any form of gender non-conforming and homosexual activity could receive a ten-year jail sentence. Uganda's Anti-Homosexuality Act of 2023, which permits the use of capital punishment for certain types of consensual same-sex activities, has also garnered significant international attention.

Burundi became the first country in the 21st century to criminalize sodomy in 2009, followed by Chad in 2017, Mali in 2024, Burkina Faso in 2025, and Niger in 2026. Previously, these countries never had any laws against consensual same-sex activity. Conversely, some African states have abolished sodomy laws in the 21st century. Cape Verde in 2004, Lesotho and São Tomé and Príncipe in 2012, Mozambique in 2015, Seychelles in 2016, Botswana in 2019, Angola in 2021, Mauritius in 2023, and Namibia in 2024. Legalization is proposed in some African states like Eswatini, Ghana, Kenya, Liberia, Malawi, Togo, Zambia and Zimbabwe. Gabon passed a law criminalizing sodomy in 2019, but reversed its decision in 2020, when it decriminalized homosexuality.

Since 2011, some developed countries have implemented, or considered implementing, laws limiting or prohibiting general budget support to countries that restrict the rights of LGBTQ people. Rather than fueling the granting of greater LGBTQ rights, in some areas, this has exacerbated homophobic sentiments. Past African leaders such as Zimbabwe's Robert Mugabe and Uganda's Yoweri Museveni have claimed that homosexuality is an "un-African" import from Europe. However, most scholarship and research demonstrate that homosexuality has long been a part of various African cultures.

== History ==
=== Ancient history ===
==== Egypt ====
Ancient Egypt had documented third gender categories, including for eunuchs. In the Tale of Two Brothers (from 3,200 years ago), Bata removes his penis and tells his wife "I am a woman just like you"; one modern scholar called him temporarily (before his body is restored) "transgendered".

Ancient Egyptian attitudes towards homosexuality remain unclear. There are no records condemning or penalising homosexuality, but documents that make reference to sexuality do not clearly reference specific sexual acts. Thus, a simple evaluation remains problematic.

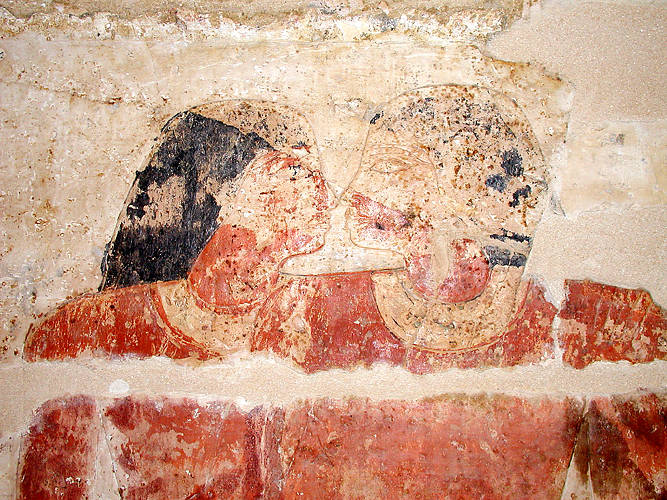
Khnumhotep and Niankhkhnum depicted nose to nose and embracing in their tomb

The best-known case of possible homosexuality in ancient Egypt is that of the two high officials Niankhkhnum and Khnumhotep. Both men lived and served under Pharaoh Niuserre during the 5th Dynasty (c. 2494–2345 BC). Both Niankhkhnum and Khnumhotep had wives and children, but were buried together in one mastaba tomb. In this mastaba, several paintings depict the men embracing and touching the tips of their noses together. In ancient Egypt, this gesture typically represented a kiss. There has been much disagreement between Egyptologists and historians over how these paintings should be interpreted. Some scholars believe that the paintings reflect a same-sex relationship between two married men, suggesting the ancient Egyptians were accepting of homosexuality. Other scholars interpret the scenes as evidence that Niankhkhnum and Khnumhotep were twins, possibly conjoined twins.

The Roman Emperor Constantine in the 4th century AD is said to have exterminated a large number of "effeminate priests" based in Alexandria.

=== Modern history ===
==== North Africa ====
There is well-documented evidence of homosexuality in Northern Africa - particularly from the period of Mamluk rule. Arabic poetry emerging from cosmopolitan regions describes the pleasures of pederastic relationships, including accounts of Christian boys sent from Europe to become sex workers in Egypt. In Cairo, cross-dressing men called khawal would entertain audiences with song and dance - a tradition thought to be of pre-Islamic origin.

Accounts of early twentieth-century travellers, frequently include accounts of homosexuality in the Siwa Oasis in Egypt. Group of warriors in the region were known to pay reverse dowries to younger men, a practice later outlawed in the 1940s.

British anthropologist Siegfried Frederick Nadel wrote about the Nuba tribes in Sudan in the late 1930s. He noted traditional roles amongst the Otoro Nuba where male-assigned people would dress and live as women and marry men. Similar gender roles exist amongst the Moru, Nyima, Krongo, Mesakin and Tira people. In the Korongo and Mesakin tribes, Nadel also reported a common reluctance amongst men to abandon the pleasures of all-male camp life for the fetters of permanent settlement.

In the late 1980s, Mufti Muhammad Sayyid Tantawy of Egypt issued a fatwa supporting the right for those who fit the description of mukhannathun and mukhannathin to have sex reassignment surgery.

==== East Africa ====
In pre-colonial East Africa, male-assigned priests (called mugawe among the Meru and Kikuyu) would dress and style their hair like women and marry men. A similar role has historically existed within the Swahili-speaking Mashoga - with some male-assigned people taking on women's names and traditional gender roles.

Among the Nuer people (in what is now South Sudan and Ethiopia), widows who bore no children would sometimes adopt male statuses and marry women (a practice which has been viewed as transgender or homosexual); the Nuer also have a traditional male-to-female role. The Maale people of Ethiopia have a traditional role for male-assigned ashtime who take on feminine roles; traditionally, they served as sexual partners for the king on days he was ritually barred from sex with women. The Life and Struggles of Our Mother Wälättä P̣eṭros (1672) makes the first reference to homosexuality between nuns in Ethiopian literature. The Amhara people have historically stigmatized men who adopted feminine dress.

==== Uganda ====
Among the Baganda, Uganda's largest ethnic group, homosexuality has traditionally been treated with indifference. The Luganda term abasiyazi refers to homosexuals, though usage nowadays is typically considered pejorative. Among the Lango people, mudoko dako individuals made up a third gender category. Homosexuality was also acknowledged among the Teso, Bahima, Banyoro, and Karamojong peoples. Societal acceptance of LGBT+ people in Uganda declined following the arrival of the British and the creation of the Protectorate of Uganda in 1894.

==== Kenya ====
Not unlike neighbouring Uganda, male homosexual relations were acknowledged and tolerated in precolonial Kenyan society. Swedish anthropologist Felix Bryk has noted active (i.e. penetrative) male homosexuality and "homo-erotic bachelors" among the pastoralist Nandi and Maragoli (Wanga) people. Crossdressing has also been historically practiced by the Nandi as well as the Maasai during initiation ceremonies.

==== West Africa ====
The Dagaaba people, in Burkina Faso, have a traditional of viewing homosexual men as possessing the ability to mediate between the spirit and human worlds. Further, they treat(ed) gender as determined by the energy of a person rather than their anatomy.

In Nigeria, the Hausa people have a phenomenon known as Yan Daudu, a group of recognised femme men in Northern Nigeria. Among the Igbo people, Male Daughters and Female Husbands are cultural practices that can be understood as expressions of gender and relational roles, in which a woman assumes the social role of a man or a woman marries another woman. Yoruba culture also has historical and cultural accounts of same-sex relationships.

==== Southern Africa ====
Writing in the 19th century in an area roughly adjacent to southwestern Zimbabwe, David Livingstone asserted that the monopolisation of women by elderly chiefs was primarily responsible for the "immorality" practised by younger men. Edwin W. Smith and A. Murray Dale described one Ila-speaking man who dressed as a woman, did women's work, and lived and slept among, but not with, women. They translated the Ila label mwaami as "prophet" and noted that pederasty was not rare, "but was considered dangerous because of the risk that the boy will become pregnant".

Marc Epprecht's review of 250 court cases from 1892 to 1923 found cases of various cases of alleged homosexuality spanning the period. Five 1892 cases involved exclusively black Africans. A defense offered was that "sodomy" was a part of local "custom". In one case a chief was summoned to testify about customary penalties and reported that the penalty was a fine of one cow, which was less than the penalty for adultery. Across the period, Epprecht found the balance of black and white defendants proportional to that in the population. He notes, however, that consensual relations in private did not necessarily provoke notice by the courts. Some cases were brought by partners who had been dropped or who had not received promised compensation by their former sexual partner. Although the norm was for the younger male to lie supine and not show any enjoyment, let alone expect any sexual mutuality, Epprecht found a case in which a pair of black males had stopped their sexual relationship out of fear of pregnancy, but one wanted to resume taking turns penetrating each other.

==== Malawi ====
Demone discusses the prominence of anti-LGBT sentiment in Malawi. British Colonial rule implemented laws criminalising the practice, which has influenced subsequent government policies. Malawi gained its independence from Britain in 1964, and has retained and enforced colonial anti-homosexuality laws ever since.

In Malawi prisons, there is documented homosexual behavior.

During the 1980s and early 1990s, President Hasting Kamuzu Banda ignored the massive rise of HIV/AIDS. From the late 1990s and early 2000s, although greater education of the virus was promoted, it is still negatively associated with homosexuality.

== Legislation by country or territory ==
=== Northern Africa ===
LGBTQ rights in:	Same-sex sexual activity	Recognition of same-sex unions	Same-sex marriage	Adoption by same-sex couples	LGBT people allowed to serve openly in military	Anti-discrimination laws concerning sexual orientation	Laws concerning gender identity/expression
Algeria	No Illegal since 11 June 1966; Penalty: Up to 3 years imprisonment with fines up to 10,000 dinars.	No	No	No	No	No	No
Canary Islands (Autonomous community of Spain)	Yes Legal since 9 November 1979 + UN decl. sign.	Yes De facto unions legal since 2003	Yes Legal since 2005	Yes Legal since 2005	Yes Spain responsible for defence	Yes Bans all anti-gay discrimination	Yes Since 2007, all documents can be amended to the recognised gender
Ceuta (Autonomous city of Spain)	Yes Legal since 9 November 1979 + UN decl. sign.	Yes De facto union since 1998	Yes Legal since 2005	Yes Legal since 2005	Yes Spain responsible for defence	Yes Bans all anti-gay discrimination	Yes Since 2007, all documents can be amended to the recognised gender
Egypt	Yes De Jure Legal; No De facto illegal Penalty: Up to 17 years imprisonment.	No	No	No	No	No	Yes / No By law, approval of religious authorities (Al-Azhar Mosque or the Coptic Orthodox Church of Alexandria) must be obtained prior to surgical intervention.
Libya	No Illegal since 2 March 1954 (as Kingdom of Libya); Penalty: Up to 5 years in jail.	No	No	No	No	No	No
Madeira (Autonomous region of Portugal)	Yes Legal since 1 January 1983 + UN decl. sign.	Yes De facto union since 2001	Yes Legal since 2010	Yes Legal since 2016	Yes Portugal responsible for defence	Yes Bans all anti-gay discrimination.	Yes Since 2011, all documents can be amended to the recognised gender
Melilla (Autonomous city of Spain)	Yes Legal since 9 November 1979 + UN decl. sign.	Yes De facto union since 2008	Yes Legal since 2005	Yes Legal since 2005	Yes Spain responsible for defence	Yes Bans all anti-gay discrimination	Yes Since 2007, all documents can be amended to the recognised gender
Morocco (including Moroccan-occupied Western Sahara)	No Illegal since 17 June 1963; Penalty: Up to 3 to 6 years imprisonment with hard labour.	No	No	No	No	No	No
Sahrawi Arab Democratic Republic (Disputed territory; only Free Zone)	No Illegal since 27 February 1976	No	No	No	No	No	No
Sudan	No Illegal since 31 January 1991 (as Anglo-Egyptian Sudan); Penalty: Life imprisonment for a third offense of anal sex.	No	No	No	No	No	No
Tunisia	No Illegal since 1 January 1914 (as the Regency of Tunis); Penalty: 3 years imprisonment.	No	No	No	No	No	No

=== Western Africa ===
LGBTQ rights in:	Same-sex sexual activity	Recognition of same-sex unions	Same-sex marriage	Adoption by same-sex couples	LGBT people allowed to serve openly in military	Anti-discrimination laws concerning sexual orientation	Laws concerning gender identity/expression
Benin	Yes Legal (No laws against same-sex sexual activity have ever existed in the country); Equal age of consent since 2018.	No	No	No		Yes Bans some anti-gay discrimination.	
Burkina Faso	No Illegal since 1 September 2025; Penalty: 2 to 5 years imprisonment.	No	No Constitutional ban since 1991	No		Yes / No Limited protections.	
Cape Verde	Yes Legal since 1 March 2004 + UN decl. sign.	No	No	No		Yes Bans some anti-gay discrimination	
(The Gambia) Gambia	No Illegal since 1 January 1889 (as the Gambia Colony and Protectorate); Penalty: Up to life imprisonment.	No	No	No	No	No	No Forms of gender expression criminalized since 2013
Ghana	No Male illegal since 1 January 1893 (as the Gold Coast); Penalty: Up to 3 years imprisonment (repeal proposed); Yes Female legal, Criminalization pending 2024	No	No Constitutional ban since 1992	No	No	Yes / No Limited protections.	No
Guinea	No Illegal since 6 August 1988; Penalty: 6 months to 10 years imprisonment. (rarely enforced)	No	No	No	No	Yes / No Limited protections.	No
Guinea-Bissau	Yes Legal since 1 March 1993 + UN decl. sign.	No	No	No		Yes / No Limited protection regarding domestic violence.	
Ivory Coast	Yes Legal (No laws against same-sex sexual activity have ever existed in the country); Age of consent discrepancy	No	No	No		Yes / No Limited protections.	
Liberia	No Illegal since 3 April 1978; Penalty: 1 year imprisonment. (repeal proposed)	No	No	No	No	Yes Bans some anti-gay discrimination.	No
Mali	No Illegal since 13 December 2024; Penalty: 7 years imprisonment and a fine of 500,000 francs.	No	No Constitutional ban since 2023	No		No	No
Mauritania	No No Illegal since 9 July 1983; Penalty (de jure): Execution for men, (not enforced, under moratorium), up to 2 years in prison and fines for women (de facto): up to 2 years in prison and a fine.	No	No	No	No	No	No
Niger	No Illegal since 26 March 2025, codified since 11 June 2026; Penalty: 5 to 10 years imprisonment and a fine of up to 100,000,000 francs.	No	No Constitutional ban since 2025	No	No	Yes / No Limited protections.	No
Nigeria	No Illegal since 1 June 1904 (Northern Region only); Illegal since 1 June 1916 (Colony and Protectorate of Nigeria); Penalty: Up to 14 years imprisonment. No Death in the states of Bauchi, Borno, Gombe, Jigawa, Kaduna, Kano, Katsina, Kebbi, Niger, Sokoto, Yobe, and Zamfara. (not enforced)	No	No Statutory ban since 2013	No	No	No / Yes Limited (education)	No Forms of gender expression criminalized in Sharia provinces.
Saint Helena, Ascension and Tristan da Cunha (Overseas Territory of the United Kingdom)	Yes Legal since 1 January 2001 + UN decl. sign.	Yes Legal since 2017	Yes Legal since 2017	Yes Legal since 2017	Yes UK responsible for defence	Yes Bans all anti-gay discrimination	
Senegal	No Illegal since 1 March 1966; Penalty: Up to 10 years imprisonment.	No	No	No	No	No	No
Sierra Leone	No Male illegal since 1 November 1861 (as the Sierra Leone Colony and Protectorate); Penalty: Up to life imprisonment (not enforced, repeal disputed). Yes Female always legal + UN decl. sign.	No	No	No	No	Yes Bans some anti-gay discrimination.	No
Togo	No Illegal since 13 August 1980; Penalty: 1 to 3 years imprisonment and fines. (rarely enforced, repeal proposed)	No	No	No	No	Yes / No Limited protections.	No

=== Central Africa ===
LGBTQ rights in:	Same-sex sexual activity	Recognition of same-sex unions	Same-sex marriage	Adoption by same-sex couples	LGBT people allowed to serve openly in military	Anti-discrimination laws concerning sexual orientation	Laws concerning gender identity/expression
Cameroon	No Illegal since 28 September 1972; Penalty: Up to 5 years imprisonment and fines. (repeal proposed)	No	No	No	No	No	No
Central African Republic	Yes Legal (No laws against same-sex sexual activity have ever existed in the country) + UN decl. sign.	No	No Constitutional ban since 2016	No		Yes / No Limited protections.	No
Chad	No Illegal since 1 August 2017; Penalty: 3 months to 2 years in prison, with fines of 50,000 to 500,000 FCFA. (Penal Code, Chapter 2, Article 354)	No	No	No	No	Yes / No Aggravated punishment when the rape is committed because of the sexual orientation of the victim.	No
Democratic Republic of the Congo	Yes Legal (No laws against same-sex sexual activity have ever existed in the country)	No	No Constitutional ban since 2006	No		Yes / No Limited protections	No
Republic of the Congo	Yes Legal (No laws against same-sex sexual activity have ever existed in the country); Age of consent discrepancy	No	No	No		Yes / No Limited protections.	No
Equatorial Guinea	Yes Legal since 12 October 1968	No	No	No		Yes Bans some anti-gay discrimination.	No
Gabon	Yes Legal since 17 August 1960-4 July 2019, again since 29 June 2020; Age of consent discrepancy, + UN decl. sign.	No	No Constitutional ban since 2024	No		Yes / No Limited protections.	
São Tomé and Príncipe	Yes Legal since 29 November 2012 + UN decl. sign.	No	No	No		Yes Bans some anti-gay discrimination	

=== Eastern Africa ===
LGBTQ rights in:	Same-sex sexual activity	Recognition of same-sex unions	Same-sex marriage	Adoption by same-sex couples	LGBT people allowed to serve openly in military	Anti-discrimination laws concerning sexual orientation	Laws concerning gender identity/expression
Burundi	No Illegal since 22 April 2009; Penalty: 3 months to 2 years imprisonment and fines. (repeal disputed)	No	No Constitutional ban since 2005	No	No	No	No
Djibouti	Yes Legal (No laws against same-sex sexual activity have ever existed in the country)	No	No	No		Yes / No Limited protections.	No
Eritrea	No Illegal since 23 July 1957 (as the British Military Administration of Eritrea); Penalty: Up to 7 years imprisonment. (rarely enforced)	No	No	No	No	No	No
Ethiopia	No Illegal since 5 May 1958 (as the Occupied Enemy Territory Administration in Ethiopia); Penalty: Up to 15 years. (repeal disputed)	No	No Statutory ban since 2009	No	No	No	No
Kenya	No Illegal since 1 August 1897 (as the East Africa Protectorate); Penalty: up to 14 years imprisonment. (repeal proposed)	No	No Constitutional ban since 2010	No	No	Yes / No Limited protections.	Yes
Rwanda	Yes Legal (No laws against same-sex sexual activity have ever existed in the country) + UN decl. sign.	No	No Constitutional ban since 2003	No		Yes / No Limited protections.	No
Somalia	No Illegal since 3 April 1964; Penalty: Up to 3 years prison. Jubaland No Illegal. Penalty: Up to death in Jubaland.	No	No	No	No	No	No
Somaliland (Disputed territory)	No Illegal since 16 March 1941; No Penalty: Up to 3 years prison, sometimes death sentences.	No	No	No	No	No	No
South Sudan	No Illegal since 31 January 1991 (as Anglo-Egyptian Sudan); Penalty: Up to 10 years imprisonment. (not enforced)	No	No Constitutional ban since 2011	No	No	Yes / No Limited protections.	No Forms of gender expression are criminalized.
Tanzania	No Illegal since 1 June 1899 (as part of German East Africa); Illegal since 1 January 1900 (as part of the Sultanate of Zanzibar); Penalty: 30 years to life imprisonment. (repeal disputed)	No	No	No	No	Yes / No Hate crime protections on sexual orientation since 2023.	No
Uganda	No Male illegal since 1 April 1902 (as the Protectorate of Uganda); Female illegal since 8 December 2000; No Penalty: Up to Capital punishment for "aggravated homosexuality"	No	No Constitutional ban since 2005	No	No	No / Yes Limited protections.	No

=== Indian Ocean states ===
LGBTQ rights in:	Same-sex sexual activity	Recognition of same-sex unions	Same-sex marriage	Adoption by same-sex couples	LGBT people allowed to serve openly in military	Anti-discrimination laws concerning sexual orientation	Laws concerning gender identity/expression
Comoros	No Illegal since 31 October 1982; Penalty: 5 years imprisonment and fines. (not enforced)	No	No	No	No	No	No
French Southern and Antarctic Lands (Overseas territory of France)	Yes Legal (No laws against same-sex sexual activity have ever existed in the territory)	Yes Civil solidarity pact since 1999	Yes Legal since 2013	Yes Legal since 2013	Yes France responsible for defence	Yes Bans all anti-gay discrimination	Yes Under French law
Madagascar	Yes Legal (No laws against same-sex sexual activity have ever existed in the country); Age of consent discrepancy	No	No	No		Yes / No Limited protections.	
Mayotte (Overseas region of France)	Yes Legal (No laws against same-sex sexual activity have ever existed in the region)	Yes Civil solidarity pact since 2007	Yes Legal since 2013	Yes Legal since 2013	Yes France responsible for defence	Yes Bans all anti-gay discrimination	Yes Under French law
Mauritius	Yes Legal since 4 October 2023 + UN decl. sign.	No	No	No	Has no military	Yes Bans all anti-gay discrimination	
Réunion (Overseas region of France)	Yes Legal since 6 October 1791	Yes Civil solidarity pact since 1999	Yes Legal since 2013	Yes Legal since 2013	Yes France responsible for defence	Yes Bans all anti-gay discrimination	Yes Under French law
Seychelles	Yes Legal since 1 June 2016 + UN decl. sign.	No	No	No		Yes Bans some anti-gay discrimination	

=== Southern Africa ===
LGBTQ rights in:	Same-sex sexual activity	Recognition of same-sex unions	Same-sex marriage	Adoption by same-sex couples	LGBT people allowed to serve openly in military	Anti-discrimination laws concerning sexual orientation	Laws concerning gender identity/expression
Angola	Yes Legal since 9 February 2021	No	No	No	No	Yes Bans all anti-gay discrimination	May possibly change gender under the Código do Registro Civil 2015
Botswana	Yes Legal since 11 June 2019	No	No	No	Yes	Yes Bans all anti-gay discrimination	Yes Legal gender change recognized as a constitutional right since 2017
Eswatini	No Male illegal since 22 February 1907 (as the Swaziland Protectorate; not enforced, repeal proposed); Penalty: Unknown; Yes Female always legal	No	No	No	No	Yes / No Hate speech ban, only in broadcasting.	Yes Recognized since 1984
Lesotho	Yes Male legal since 1 February 2012; Female always legal	No	No	No		Yes Bans some anti-gay discrimination.	Yes Legal recognition since 1975
Malawi	No Illegal since 1 July 1891 (as British Central Africa Protectorate); Penalty: Up to 14 years imprisonment, with or without corporal punishment for men. Up to 5 years imprisonment for women (rarely enforced, repeal proposed)	No	No	No	No	Yes / No Limited protections.	No
Mozambique	Yes Legal since 29 June 2015	No	No	No	No	Yes Bans some anti-gay discrimination	
Namibia	Yes Legal since 21 June 2024	No / Yes Foreign same-sex marriages recognised	No / Yes Foreign same-sex marriages recognised	No	No	Yes Bans some anti-gay discrimination.	Yes Under the Births, Marriages and Deaths Registration Act 81 of 1963
South Africa	Yes Male legal since 8 May 1998; Female always legal; equal age of consent since 2007 + UN decl. sign.	Yes Limited recognition of unregistered partnerships since 1998; same-sex marriage since 2006	Yes Legal since 2006	Yes Legal since 2002	Yes Since 1998	Yes Constitution bans all anti-gay discrimination	Yes Anti-discrimination laws are interpreted to include gender identity; legal gender may be changed after surgical or medical treatment
Zambia	No Illegal since 17 August 1911 (as part of the British South Africa Company rule of Rhodesia); Penalty: 14 years to life imprisonment. (repeal proposed)	No	No	No	No	Yes / No Limited protections.	No
Zimbabwe	No Male illegal since 1891 (as Rhodesia); Female illegal since 2006 Penalty: Up to 1 year imprisonment with fines (repeal proposed)	No	No Constitutional ban since 2013	No	No	Yes / No Limited protections.	No

== Public opinion ==
=== Views of African leaders on homosexuality ===
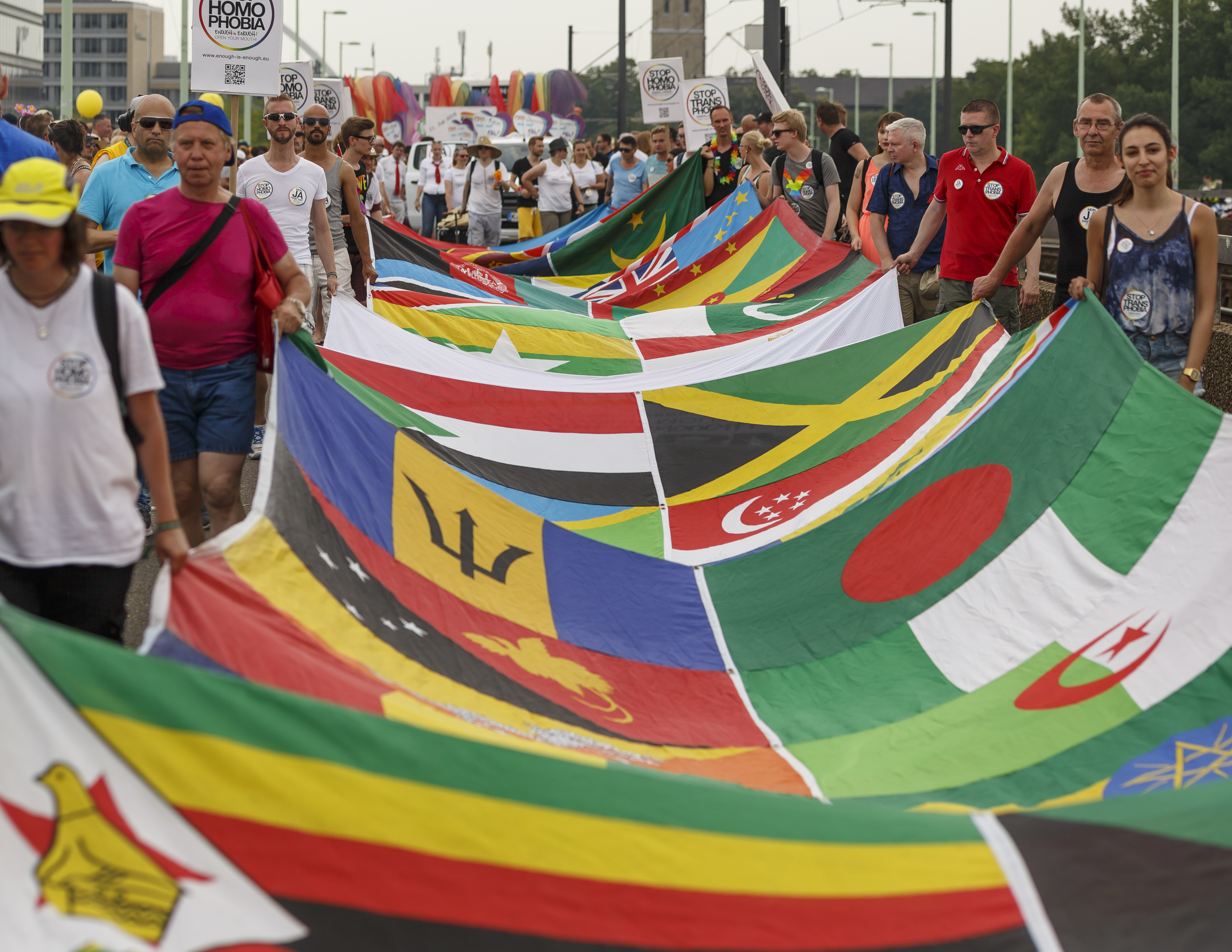
LGBTQ activists at Cologne Pride carrying a banner with the flags of the then-72 countries with laws against homosexuality. Some of the African countries shown are Zimbabwe, Ethiopia, Nigeria, Algeria, Sudan, Mauritania (using the pre-2017 flag), Botswana (legalized 2019), Gambia, and Egypt.

The presidencies of Robert Mugabe between 1987 and 2017 were characterised by uncompromising hostility to LGBTQ rights in Zimbabwe. In September 1995, Zimbabwe's parliament introduced legislation banning homosexual acts. In 1997, a court found Canaan Banana, Mugabe's predecessor and the first President of Zimbabwe, guilty of 11 counts of sodomy and indecent assault. Mugabe has previously referred to LGBTQ people as "worse than dogs and pigs".

In the Gambia, President Yahya Jammeh (between 1996 and 2019), called for anti-gay legislation "stricter than those in Iran", declaring he would "cut off the head" of any gay or lesbian person discovered in the country. In a speech given in Tallinding, Jammeh gave a "final ultimatum" to any gays or lesbians in the Gambia to leave the country. In a speech to the United Nations on 27 September 2013, Jammeh said that "[h]omosexuality in all its forms and manifestations which, though very evil, antihuman as well as anti-Allah, is being promoted as a human right by some powers", and that those who do so "want to put an end to human existence". In 2014, Jammeh called homosexuals "vermins" that must be fought "in the same way we are fighting malaria-causing mosquitoes, if not more aggressively". He went on to declare: "As far as I am concerned, LGBT can only stand for Leprosy, Gonorrhoea, Bacteria and Tuberculosis; all of which are detrimental to human existence". In 2015, following Western criticism, Jammeh intensified his anti-gay rhetoric, telling a crowd during an agricultural tour: "If you do it [in the Gambia] I will slit your throat—if you are a man and want to marry another man in this country and we catch you, no one will ever set eyes on you again, and no white person can do anything about it."

In Uganda, recent efforts against LGBTQ+ rights culminated in the Anti-Homosexuality Act of 2023 on March 22, 2023, making it illegal allowing to identify as LGBTQ, punishable by life in prison, and allowing the death penalty for "aggravated homosexuality". The United States, United Kingdom, Canada, Germany, and the European Union, as well as several local and international NGOs have condemned the act. However, it was sponsored by American Pentecostal communities in Uganda, who have a strong base in the country, and have supported previous anti-gay legislation passed in 2014. British newspaper The Guardian reported that President Yoweri Museveni "appeared to add his backing" to the 2023 legislative effort by, among other things, claiming "European homosexuals are recruiting in Africa", and describing gay relationships as against God's will. In a 2014 interview with CNN, Museveni described homosexuals as "disgusting" and "unnatural", although he stated he would ignore them if it was proven that "[he] is born that way". He further said that he had appointed a group of scientists in Uganda to determine if homosexuality was a learned orientation. This led to widespread criticism from the scientific community, with an academic of the National Institutes of Health calling on his Ugandan counterparts to reconsider their findings.

=== Role of religion in influencing public attitudes ===
In Ethiopia, where same-sex activity is criminalised with up to fifteen years of life imprisonment under the Penal Code Article 629, the Ethiopian Orthodox Tewahedo Church plays a significant role in maintaining anti-gay attitudes, with some members forming anti-gay movements. One of these movements is "Zim Anlem" founded by Dereje Negash, who is strongly affiliated with the national Church. Abune Paulos, the late Patriarch of the Church, has stated that homosexuality is an animal-like behaviour that must be punished.

In much of north Africa, Islam has played a significant role in informing socially conservative attitudes hostile to queer rights. Despite not finding punishment for homosexual acts prescribed in the Quran, regarding the hadith that mentioned it as poorly attested, Egyptian Islamist journalist Muhammad Jalal Kishk personally disapproved of homosexual acts. However, he believed that Muslims who abstained from sodomy would be rewarded by sex with youthful boys in paradise. By contrast, in 2017, the Egyptian cleric, Sheikh Yusuf al-Qaradawi (who has served as chairman of the European Council for Fatwa and Research) was asked how gay people should be punished. He replied that "there is disagreement", but "the important thing is to treat this act as a crime".

=== Association with Western culture ===
Homosexuality is often viewed as a product of Western culture and un-African. Some historians deny that homosexuality was present in Africa prior to colonialism, though this is false. Post-colonial tensions persist in Africa. Countries which formally colonized Africa are seen as moral leaders advocating for homosexuality. When Western nations get involved with LGBTQ rights in African countries, it can cause strong public reactions.

In 2011, the European Union increased funding for organizations in Cameroon serving gay people, this sparked media backlash in the country. In 2015, an American ambassador in Burkina Faso briefly talked about a drafted anti-homosexuality bill with Chérif Sy, and, the ambassador was subsequently seen as meddling with the country's culture. Speculation brewed as the media discussed what happened, and it assumed that the ambassador was using American aid as a form of blackmail by making it contingent on government support of LGBTQ rights.

Support strategies from Western countries can easily backfire if handled poorly. Framing the country receiving support as morally inferior and in need of rescue stigmatizes non-Western countries and creates a combative dichotomy of being either pro or anti-LGBTQ. Punitive measures like condemnation, threatening to take away foreign aid, or suspending foreign aid creates backlash that is taken out on LGBTQ people within the country. Western countries are perceived as having double standards by calling out harm done to LGBTQ people in some countries but not others depending on what is politically advantageous. Even when punitive interventions succeed, they further solidify the idea that LGBTQ rights are impositions by Western countries.

Western influence is not always pro-LGBTQ. For instance, the African Inter-Parliamentary Conference on Family Values and Sovereignty invites conversative figures from the United States and Europe. The Institute for Journalism and Social Change, an American Christian-rights group with a history of anti-gender campaigning, spent 5.2 million dollars in Africa in 2022. In 2023, United States representative Tim Walberg gave a speech imploring Uganda to remain steadfast with its anti-LGBTQ legislation.

=== Advocacy for LGBT rights ===
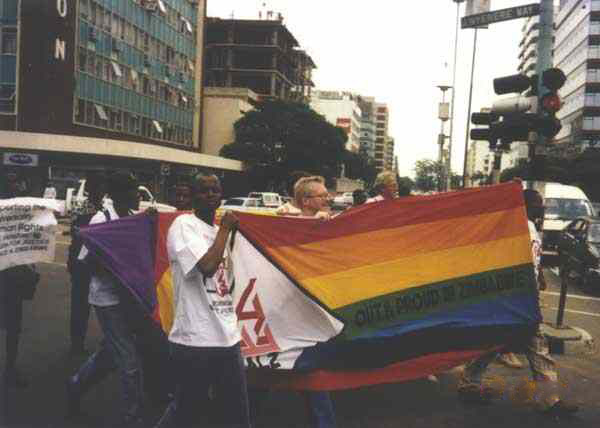
1998 LGBTQ rights march in Harare, Zimbabwe

In Morocco, the organisation Kif-Kif advocates for queer rights, publishing the monthly Mithly magazine in Spain. Despite lacking legal recognition, it has been unofficially authorised to organise specific educational seminars.

In Uganda, the advocacy group Sexual Minorities Uganda was founded in 2004 by human rights activist Victor Mukasa. In 2014, they led a coalition of 55 organisations in successfully overturning the Anti-Homosexuality Act.

=== Opinion Polls ===
==== General acceptance ====
Indicates the country/territory has legalised same-sex marriage nationwide
Indicates that same-sex marriage is legal in certain parts of the country
Indicates that the country has civil unions or registered partnerships
Indicates that same-sex sexual activity is illegal

Response to "Should society accept homosexuals?" by country:
Country	Should (%)	Should not (%)	Source
South Africa	54%	38%	
Kenya	14%	83%	
Ivory Coast	11%	89%	
Nigeria	7%	91%	
Uganda	4%	96%	
Tanzania	3%	95%	
Egypt	3%	95%	
Ghana	3%	96%	
Senegal	3%	96%	
Ethiopia	2%	97%	
Mali	1%	98%	

==== Marriage ====
Indicates the country/territory has legalised same-sex marriage nationwide
Indicates that same-sex marriage is legal in certain parts of the country
Indicates that the country has civil unions or registered partnerships
Indicates that same-sex sexual activity is illegal

Opinion polls for same-sex marriage by country
Country	Pollster	Year	For	Against	Neutral (Note: Also comprises: Don't know; No answer; Other; Refused.)	Margin of error	Source
Kenya	Pew Research Center	2023	9%	90%	1%	±3.6%	
Mozambique (3 cities)	Lambda	2017	28% (32%)	60% (68%)	12%		
Nigeria	Pew Research Center	2023	2%	97%	1%	±3.6%	
South Africa	Ipsos	2023	57%	29% [10% support some rights]	14%	±3.5% (Note: [+ more urban/educated than representative])	

==== Adoption ====
Indicates the country/territory has legalized same-sex adoption nationwide
Indicates that same-sex adoption is legal in certain parts of the country
Indicates that the country has step-child adoption or partner-guardianship
Indicates that same-sex sexual activity is illegal

Opinion polls for same-sex adoption in Africa
Country	Pollster	Year	For (Note: Because some polls do not report 'neither', those that do are listed with simple yes/no percentages in parentheses, so their figures can be compared.)	Against	Neither (Note: Comprises: Neutral, don't know, no answer, other, refused.)	Margin of error
Kenya	Pew Research Center	2023	9%	90%	1%	±3.6%
Nigeria	Pew Research Center	2023	2%	97%	1%	±3.6%
South Africa	Ipsos	2023	57% (66%)	29% [10% support some rights] (34%)	14%	±3.5%
South Africa	Pew Research Center	2023	38%	58%	4%	±3.6%

=== Homosexuals as neighbours ===
Indicates the country/territory has legalised same-sex marriage nationwide
Indicates that same-sex marriage is legal in certain parts of the country
Indicates that the country has civil unions or registered partnerships
Indicates that same-sex sexual activity is illegal

Opinion polls on homosexual neighbours by country
Country	Pollster	Year	For	Against	Source
Angola	Afrobarometer	2023	36%	56%	
Benin	Afrobarometer	2023	16%	84%	
Botswana	Afrobarometer	2023	45%	54%	
Burkina Faso	Afrobarometer	2023	11%	88%	
Cameroon	Afrobarometer	2023	13%	87%	
Cape Verde	Afrobarometer	2023	82%	18%	
Ethiopia	Afrobarometer	2023	13%	79%	
Eswatini	Afrobarometer	2023	42%	57%	
Gabon	Afrobarometer	2023	18%	81%	
Gambia	Afrobarometer	2023	7%	93%	
Ghana	Afrobarometer	2023	9%	91%	
Guinea	Afrobarometer	2023	13%	87%	
Ivory Coast	Afrobarometer	2023	15%	84%	
Kenya	Afrobarometer	2023	20%	79%	
Lesotho	Afrobarometer	2023	30%	69%	
Liberia	Afrobarometer	2023	13%	87%	
Madagascar	Afrobarometer	2023	9%	90%	
Malawi	Afrobarometer	2023	7%	92%	
Mali	Afrobarometer	2023	6%	91%	
Mauritania	Afrobarometer	2023	23%	77%	
Mauritius	Afrobarometer	2023	60%	34%	
Morocco	Afrobarometer	2023	15%	84%	
Mozambique	Afrobarometer	2023	52%	45%	
Namibia	Afrobarometer	2023	49%	49%	
Niger	Afrobarometer	2023	5%	94%	
Nigeria	Afrobarometer	2023	14%	81%	
Republic of the Congo	Afrobarometer	2023	27%	73%	
Sao Tome and Principe	Afrobarometer	2023	46%	53%	
Senegal	Afrobarometer	2023	6%	93%	
Seychelles	Afrobarometer	2023	66%	30%	
Sierra Leone	Afrobarometer	2023	6%	94%	
South Africa	Afrobarometer	2023	71%	23%	
Sudan	Afrobarometer	2023	21%	76%	
Tanzania	Afrobarometer	2023	8%	92%	
Togo	Afrobarometer	2023	13%	87%	
Tunisia	Afrobarometer	2023	11%	80%	
Uganda	Afrobarometer	2023	6%	94%	
Zambia	Afrobarometer	2023	7%	92%	
Zimbabwe	Afrobarometer	2023	21%	78%	

== See also ==
- Recognition of same-sex unions in Africa
- Human rights in Africa
- Queer African Youth Network
- Coalition of African Lesbians
- LGBTQ rights by country or territory
- LGBTQ rights in Europe
- LGBTQ rights in the Americas
- LGBTQ rights in Asia
- LGBTQ rights in Oceania
- Timeline of African and diasporic LGBT history
- African-American LGBTQ community
- Black gay pride
