= LGBTQ rights in Equatorial Guinea =

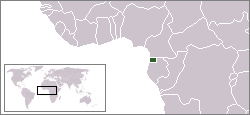
- Equatorial Guinea
- Legal status: Legal
- Gender identity: No
- Military: No
- Discrimination protections: Some protections in employment on the basis of sexual orientation.

Family rights
- Recognition of relationships: No
- Adoption: No

Lesbian, gay, bisexual, transgender, and queer (LGBTQ) people in Equatorial Guinea have some legal rights, although LGBTQ people continue to face legal challenges not experienced by non-LGBTQ residents. Both male and female same-sex sexual activity are legal in Equatorial Guinea; however LGBTQ persons face stigmatization among the broader population. Same-sex couples and households headed by same-sex couples are not eligible for the same legal protections available to opposite-sex couples.

The new Penal Code adopted in 2022 prohibits employment discrimination based on a person's sexual orientation, being the first legal provision to explicitly protect lesbian, gay, and bisexual people.

== Laws regarding same-sex sexual activity ==
Although there are no laws against homosexuality in Equatorial Guinea, the International Lesbian, Gay, Bisexual, Trans and Intersex Association (ILGA) report "there is evidence that State intimidation of sexually diverse individuals persists." The criminal code in force in Equatorial Guinea is a revision of the Spanish Criminal Code that dates back to the Francoist era and is said to post-colonially carry anti-homophobic undertones that influence those perception today. The age of consent is set at 18, regardless of gender and/or sexual orientation.

Although there is not a law explicitly criminalizing homosexuality, LGBTQ+ people are still detained and punished through public shaming. In 2014, four men were detained and accused of being gay. On one of their phones, the police found a video of two of the men engaging in sexual activity together. The group was arrested and made to explain their actions on national television. One woman recounted in an interview how a lesbian couple in Añisok were detained and publicly shamed; the couple were displayed through the town with banners saying they were witchcraft-practicing lesbians. Photos were taken and distributed around town. The women were tied to the police station.

In August 2023, police illegally detained Trifonia Melibea Obono, founder of the LGBTQ+ organization Somos Parte del Mundo (English: We Are Part of the World). Her detainment was after the organization gave their report "Torture, Cruel, Inhuman and Degrading Treatment against LGTBQI+ people in Equatorial Guinea" to the European Union headquarters in Madrid, Spain. Since the report was submitted, arrests and restrictions on LGBTQ+ people have risen significantly.

== Recognition of same-sex relationships ==
Same-sex couples have no legal recognition.

== Discrimination protections ==
Since November 15, 2022, Article 364(2) of the new Penal Code prohibits employment discrimination against any person on the basis of their sexual orientation.

Furthermore, Law 1/2016 on the Protection of Personal Data establishes, in Articles 10 and 41, the protection of personal data related to "sexual life" that entails discrimination.

== Living conditions ==
As a society, Equatorial Guinea sees homosexuality as a pathology. Somos Parte del Mundo has been documenting cases of human rights violations against LGBTQ+ people since 2016. The U.S. Department of State's 2021 Human Rights Report found that "No laws criminalize consensual same-sex sexual conduct between adults, but societal stigmatization of and discrimination against the LGBTQI+ community was a problem. The government made no effort to combat this stigma and discrimination." Somos Parte del Mundo and another organization called Somos+ (English name: We Are More) submitted requests in 2016 and 2018 respectively yet have remained unregistered.

LGBTQ+ people face discrimination in education and employment. School officials have reportedly denied transgender students access to some facilities. Teachers have also reportedly discrimated against and excluded LGBTQ+ girls. Family can be an educational barrier because LGBTQ+ children are often forced out of their homes. This often causes them to drop out of school. Academics and government employees can be ousted if they are perceived as not being heterosexual.

Minors are sexually exploited for commercial sex; transgender children are especially vulnerable according to a local non-governmental organization. LGBTQ+ women and transgender men are vulnerable to sexual violence in the military and from family. Rape is sometimes used as a form of conversion therapy. Queer women are forcibly impregnated in an attempt to make them heterosexual. Transgender women have reported experiencing harassment and sexual violence while in police custody. Laws against rape are not effectively enforced since the crime is rarely reported. If a reported perpetrator has political connections or is a member of the police or military, police and judicial officials may choose not to take action. There are reports of security forces subjecting LGBTQ+ people to sexual violence and discrimination in the military, jails, and prison.

== Summary table ==
Same-sex sexual activity legal	Yes (Always legal)
Equal age of consent (18)	Yes (Since 1931)
Anti-discrimination laws in hate speech and violence	No
Anti-discrimination laws in employment	Yes (Since 2022)
Anti-discrimination laws in the provision of goods and services	No
Same-sex marriage	No
Recognition of same-sex couples	No
Step-child adoption by same-sex couples	No
Joint adoption by same-sex couples	No
Gays and lesbians allowed to serve openly in the military	No
Right to change legal gender	No
Access to IVF for lesbians	No
Commercial surrogacy for gay male couples	No
MSMs allowed to donate blood	No

== See also ==
- Human rights in Equatorial Guinea
- LGBTQ rights in Africa
