= Ƴan daudu =

Hausa term for men who act like women

Ƴan daudu (or ʼyan daudu) is a term used in pre-Islamic times to refer to men exhibiting feminine traits in the Hausa language. These men in contemporary Hausa society are seen as men who are sexually attracted to or intimate with other men. In Hausa Fulani mythology, ƴan daudu possess feminine attributes associated with transvestite or third-gender roles, and they were known to be engaging in Hausa Animism practices such as Bori religious practice of the Maguzanci found in present-day Kano state, Nigeria. This was, however, long before the introduction of Islam in northern Nigeria and in Southern Niger. Ƴan daudu are seen as effeminate male sex workers and pimps who sometimes have intimate relationships with other men but do not necessarily identify as homosexuals. They marry women, have children and establish families. The name ƴan duadu is traceable to Dan Galadima: a loose, gambling, and colourfully well-dressed male spirit. Ƴan daudu translates to "sons of Daudu".

Often compared with the Hijra in Southern Asia, ƴan daudu are still found within the Hausa community, particularly in Kano and its surrounding Hausa-Fulani states. Ƴan daudu in pre-Islamic times performed women-like dances and donated money to cult-adepts, upon the appearance of Galadima. Today, ƴan daudu are categorized among homosexuals in Nigeria.

== Religious beliefs and practices ==
Ƴan daudu in pre-Islamic times were classified among the magazawa (Sing., bamaguje) The Magazawa in Hausa religious culture are pagans who refused to follow/believe in the teachings of Islam. Their faith is deeply rooted in the worship of Jinn (Aljanu or Iskoki in Hausa), who they see as supernatural spirits and God. Jinn are believed to possess all the supernatural powers possessed by God or Allah. The Magazawa believe that these supernatural spirits can offer or withhold health, children, rain and bountiful harvest, and can provide peace and security to them as well as unleash punishment for those who sin against them through plagues, natural disasters or other forms of epidemics. Among these Jinns (Alijanu and Iskoki) gods and spirits were these, as described by Tremearne in 1912:

Kuri, a male corresponding to Pan, another name being Rago; he barks like a dog, and wears a goat-skin. Possibly the baboon is responsible for this idea, as he barks; or Kuri may have come from Kure, a male hyaena. The proper sacrifice to him is a young red he-goat, but he eats human beings.

Uwardowa, a female, the goddess of hunting, the name signifying "Forest-Mother." The appropriate offering is a red she-goat, or a red cock.

Sa(r)rikin Rafi (or Kogi) is a water spirit, perhaps the same as Dodo, who is mentioned later. It would appear that a virgin was sacrificed to him at one time.

Ayu is a spirit living in the water, which drags people down. This name is also given to the manatee.

Uwayara is a spirit which kills the mother and her new-born child.

The echo is attributed to a supernatural agency, in fact it is sometimes called Iblis, devil, or Kurua, meaning soul, spirit, shadow.

Fatalua and Magiro are evil beings of some kind, though I could not discover the exact meaning of the words.

Gajjimare is the god of rain and storms, which has the shape of a snake, and is double-gendered, the male part being red, the female blue. It lives in the storm-clouds (same name), but is supposed to come out at night, and it is also said to inhabit wells, and in fact all watering-places, so a pot is kept full in every house. Gajjimare (rainbow) may be represented by the water-serpent killed in the legend of Daura before referred to, but sometimes it is said to be the husband of Uwardowa, and the father of Kuri. Other names of the rainbow are Masharua, "water drinker,” and Bakkan gizzo, "spider's bow."

== Dan galadima ==
In Hausa mythology, Dan Galadima is associated with sweet, aromatic herbs. He is the son of Sarkin Aljan Biddarene but he was raised in the household of Sarkin Aljan Suleimanu; however, other versions of Hausa mythology suggest his real father is the Bori spirit Malam Alhaji. Ƴan daudu in flamboyant dresses will dance and donate money to cult-adepts, especially when the spirit Dan Galadima appears. He is offered fragrant colognes and eaux de toilettes; luxurious grooming items (he is very handsome); hand mirrors to gaze at himself; large white kola nuts; handkerchief with cowrie shells; silk scarves; a fan; things associated with gambling (dice, card decks) as sacrifices and to be found in the midst of Hausa historic women. The similarities in flamboyant style may have had some sort of influence which created a correlation between him and the ƴan daudu, who today may not necessarily be practitioners of Hausa Animism but still find themselves possessing flamboyant feminine traits in their expressions and identity.

== Occupation ==
The practice of ƴan daudu In pre-Islamic times may have not been necessarily likened to homosexuality, as many of them were seen to be married to women and fathering children, but as a social occupation. They were closely considered as pimps and favored living amongst women in gidan mata because of their sexual orientation. Gidan Mata is typically a living quarters for Karuwanci; Hausa divorced women who for fear of rejection will find solace under the leadership of magajiya; a typical magagiya is also a divorcee who has gained a reputation for housing "homeless" young girls. Many of these girls and women eventually resort to prostitution to make a daily living. Influential men will approach these young girls for sexual favors through the intercession of pimps known as ƴan daudu as they themselves (Karuwanci) will not have direct interface with their potential patronizers. The term ƴan daudu was never considered a derogatory term long before now. In fact, practitioners addresses themselves by it. This is because even though it wasn’t such a profession for one to be most proud of, it was still a profession nonetheless. As time progressed, it began to be seen as an anomaly for men to be seen and dressed like women.

== See also ==
- LGBTQ rights in Africa § West Africa
