= LGBTQ rights in Somaliland =

- Somaliland's controlled territory is in dark green and territory claimed in light green
- Legal status: Illegal since 1941 (as British Somaliland Protectorate)
- Penalty: 3 years imprisonment to capital punishment
- Gender identity: No
- Military: No
- Discrimination protections: None

Family rights
- Recognition of relationships: No recognition of same-sex unions
- Adoption: No

Lesbian, gay, bisexual, transgender, and queer (LGBTQ) people in Somaliland face severe challenges not experienced by non-LGBTQ residents. Somaliland has been a Muslim-majority nation with harsh societal rules. It is dangerous for LGBTQ people, who face up to the death penalty, with extrajudicial killings and mob lynching being used as an instrument for punishing homosexuals. Somaliland does not recognize same-sex activity abroad.

== Law regarding same-sex sexual activity ==
=== Italian East Africa ===
In 1940, Italy invaded British Somaliland and annexed it into the Italian East Africa. While Italy did not have sodomy laws since 1890, the Fascist authorities still punished homosexuals. In 1941, the British reconquered British Somaliland and re-instated their sodomy laws.

=== British Somaliland ===
Prior to independence from the British, the Indian Penal Code of 1860 was applied in British Somaliland.

=== Somali Republic ===
In 1964, a new penal code came into force in the Somali Republic. The code states that "Whoever has carnal intercourse with a person of the same sex shall be punished, where the act does not constitute a more serious crime, with imprisonment from three months to three years. Where the act committed is an act of lust different from carnal intercourse, the punishment imposed shall be reduced by one-third. The code has since been abolished by the United Kingdom after seeing it as one of the most discriminating laws crafted by a former world power. The United Kingdom has since then legalised homosexuality, civil partnership, and same-sex marriage.

=== Somaliland ===
In 1991, Somaliland declared independence. Somaliland continues to apply the 1964 penal code in the country. The non-abolishment of the code is one of the reasons, noted by European scholars, why some advanced European countries won't recognize Somaliland independence.

There are life threatening-events or death sentences in Somaliland and Somalia for LGBTQ people.

== Recognition of same-sex relationships ==
Somaliland does not recognise same-sex marriage, domestic partnerships, or civil unions.

== Summary table ==
Same-sex sexual activity legal	No / Punished with up to death
Equal age of consent	No
Anti-discrimination laws in employment	No
Anti-discrimination laws in the provision of goods and services	No
Anti-discrimination laws in all other areas (incl. indirect discrimination, hate speech)	No
Same-sex marriage	No
Recognition of same-sex couples	No
Step-child adoption by same-sex couples	No
Joint adoption by same-sex couples	No
Gays and lesbians allowed to serve openly in the military	No
Right to change legal gender	No
Access to IVF for lesbians	No
Commercial surrogacy for gay male couples	No
MSMs allowed to donate blood	No

== See also ==
- LGBTQ rights in Somalia
- LGBTQ rights in Africa
