= Female husbands of the Igbo =

Nigerian marriage practice

Female husbands are women among the Igbo people of southeastern Nigeria who marry other women. Generally, the female husband is supposed to provide for her wife in the way a man would, while her wife is expected to bear her children. This practice allows women greater economic autonomy. The practice has existed for centuries and continues today, though it has declined since the pre-colonial era.

== Reasons and purpose ==
Woman-to-woman marriage serves as a strategy for women to gain or retain access to land and other resources where only men are typically allowed to do so. It may also serve as a way for a menopausal or infertile woman to have children. In such cases, the female husband will arrange for her own husband or a male relative to impregnate her wife. Because barren widows do not inherit their husband's land, woman-to-woman marriage is an essential strategy for widows to continue living on their marital land. The offspring of such a marriage qualify as the late husband's heirs, allowing the female husband to maintain her inheritance rights. A father with no sons may also designate a "male" daughter, who will go on to marry a woman who will bear her children.

Female marriage can also be an indicator of social status, similarly to how wealthy and powerful men may have multiple wives. Wealthy women may also take on wives to carry out domestic labor, particularly if they have time-consuming business dealings. Taking wives also serves as an investment, allowing female husbands to accrue wealth. In the nineteenth and early twentieth centuries, female husbands, along with their wives and children, came to dominate the west African textile trade.

In some communities, when a family is left without a patriarch, the daughters will pool money to pay the bride price in the name of their eldest sister in order to preserve the lineage.

Woman-to-woman marriage allows for a degree of gender fluidity in Igboland, allowing female husbands to take on the role and esteem of a man. In community ceremonies, female husbands participate as equals with the men.

== Ritual ==
Woman-to-woman marriages begin with the same rites of marriage as a heterosexual couple. The female husband approaches the family of her bride-to-be to negotiate a bride price. Once the families consent to joining and the bride price is paid, the couple is blessed by the community while holding hands with the female husband's husband or another respected male member of the community.

== Geographic extent ==
Similar practices also exist among the Yoruba, Nankani, and other groups in the region.
