= LGBTQ rights in Mali =

- Mali
- Legal status: Illegal since 2024
- Penalty: 2 to 7 years imprisonment and a fine of 200,000 to 500,000 francs
- Gender identity: No
- Military: No
- Discrimination protections: None

Family rights
- Recognition of relationships: No
- Restrictions: Same-sex marriage constitutionally banned since 2023
- Adoption: No

Lesbian, gay, bisexual, transgender, and queer (LGBTQ) people in Mali face severe legal and societal challenges not experienced by non-LGBTQ residents. According to the 2007 Pew Global Attitudes Project, 98 percent (Note: The number of adults surveyed in Mali was 700, yielding a margin of error of 4 percent with a 95 percent confidence level.) of Malian adults believed that homosexuality is considered something society should not accept, which was the highest rate of non-acceptance in the 45 countries surveyed. The Constitution of Mali has outlawed same-sex marriage since 2023, and the Malian penal code has criminalized homosexuality since 2024.

The United States Department of States points to laws in Mali which prohibit "attacks on morality", and states these laws are used to target LGBTQ persons and are actively enforced.

== Legal status ==
Homosexuality has been illegal in Mali since December 2024.

On October 31, 2024, Mali's Transitional National Council passed a new penal code that criminalizes homosexuality. On December 13, 2024, the new penal code went into effect. The law is expected to exacerbate the existing climate of stigma and discrimination faced by LGBTQ individuals in Mali. It also prohibits the "promotion" of homosexuality, a term that remains undefined, thereby broadening the scope of prosecution.

Although same-sex sexual conduct was not explicitly illegal in Mali prior to the law being passed, vague provisions in the penal code, such as Article 225, which penalizes “public indecency,” were frequently used to target LGBTQ individuals and those with nonconforming gender expressions. Justice Minister Mamadou Kassogue, who announced the law, had previously described homosexuality as “unnatural” and pledged to criminalize it. The military junta ruling over Mali since 2021 attempted to justify the law as a means of defending “traditional and moral values.” The immediate result was a significant increase in arbitrary arrests and detentions, as well as physical abuse directed at individuals based solely on their appearance or gender expression.

== Discrimination protections ==
There are no anti-discrimination laws to protect the LGBTQ community from harassment and abuse on the basis of sexual orientation and gender identity. Also, societal discrimination is widespread.

== Adoption and family planning ==
Article 522 of the "Code des Personnes et de la Famille", which was passed by the National Assembly on 2 December 2011 and subsequently signed into the law by the president of Mali, forbids same-sex couples from adopting children.

Mali's new constitution, adopted by referendum in June 2023, includes a clause limiting marriage to a union of one man and one woman.

== Living conditions ==
According to Dr. Dembelé Bintou Keita, the director of ARCAD/SIDA, an HIV/AIDS organization in Mali that provides health care for men who have sex with men (MSM), Malian society is not tolerant to MSM. They "have no rights and certainly no right to claim their sexual orientation. All cultural beliefs towards MSM are negative." MSM are forced into bisexuality or underground sexual practices that put them at high risk of sexually transmitted and HIV infections. "Men who are attracted to other men are forced to get married so that they will not bring shame to the family ... but they still have men as sexual partners."

The U.S. Department of State's 2011 human rights report found that,

There were no publicly visible lesbian, gay, bisexual, and transgender (LGBT) organizations in the country. The free association of LGBT organizations was impeded by a law prohibiting association "for an immoral purpose"; in 2005 the then governor of the District of Bamako cited this law to refuse official recognition to a gay rights association.

== Summary table ==
Same-sex sexual activity legal	No (Penalty: 2 to 7 years imprisonment and a fine of 200,000 to 500,000 francs)
Equal age of consent (15)	No
Anti-discrimination laws in hate speech and violence	No
Anti-discrimination laws in employment	No
Anti-discrimination laws in the provision of goods and services	No
Same-sex marriage	No (Constitutional ban on same-sex marriage since 2023)
Recognition of same-sex couples	No
Step-child adoption by same-sex couples	No
Joint adoption by same-sex couples	No
Gays and lesbians allowed to serve openly in the military	No
Right to change legal gender	No
Access to IVF for lesbians	No
Commercial surrogacy for gay male couples	No
MSMs allowed to donate blood	No

== See also ==
- Human rights in Mali
- LGBTQ rights in Africa
