= LGBTQ rights in Benin =

- Benin
- Legal status: Legal, equal age of consent since 2018.
- Gender identity: No
- Military: No
- Discrimination protections: Limited protection based on sexual orientation (hate speech, personal data)

Family rights
- Recognition of relationships: No
- Adoption: No

Lesbian, gay, bisexual, transgender, and queer (LGBTQ) people in Benin face legal challenges not experienced by non-LGBTQ residents. Although same-sex sexual acts for both men and women are legal in Benin, homosexuals continue to face widespread persecution and are rarely open about their sexuality. They are also considered by many as deviants, and homosexuality is often called a disease brought by white people to the country. LGBTQ persons additionally face stigmatization among the broader population. Since 2018, there is limited protection against incitement of hatred and violence based on sexual orientation.

== Law regarding same-sex sexual activity ==
Same-sex sexual acts are legal in Benin between consenting adults. Article 545 of the new Penal Code in force since 2018, establishes greater penalties for anyone who has committed an indecent or unnatural act with a minor of the same sex. However, the age of sexual consent is equal regardless of sex. Previously, article 331 of the old Penal Code established the age of consent for same-sex relations at 21.

A 1947 amendment to the Penal Code of 1877 fixed a general age limit of 13 for sex with a child of either gender, but penalized any act that is indecent or against nature if committed with a person of the same sex under 21: "Without prejudice to more severe penalties prescribed by the paragraphs that precede or by Articles 332 and 333 of this Code, shall be punished with imprisonment from six months to three years and a fine of 200 to 50,000 francs anyone who commits an indecent act or [an act] against nature with a minor...of the same sex under 21 years old."

Article 88 of the 1996 draft Penal Code of Benin read "Anyone who commits an indecent act or an act against nature with an individual of the same sex will be punished by 1 to 3 years imprisonment and a fine of 100,000 to 500,000 francs." This draft, however, was never voted into law.

In response to its 2008 UNHRC Universal Periodic Review, the representative of Benin stated, "[regarding the] issue of homosexuality, the phenomenon is not ignored but is marginal. Families would never allow their children to be taken to court for such an offense, so no criminal ruling has ever been rendered, although it is provided for by law."

On 4 March 2013 the French ambassador invited the Beninese Minister of Justice to a meeting to discuss Benin's official response to its 2012 UNHRC Universal Periodic Review. Benin had rejected recommendations from states calling on Benin to improve the situation for LGBTQ persons. But at the 4 March meeting, the Minister turned to her Deputy Director who subsequently said "certain things would be rectified."

Among the more recently proposed laws regarding same-sex sexual activity is a draft penal code from October 2008, which has not yet been voted on. Unlike the 1996 draft, the 2008 draft of the Penal Code includes no reference to punishment for same-sex sexual relations between consenting adults in private:

"SECTION IV: MORAL OFFENSES
"Paragraph 1: Public outrage from assaults on decency
"Article 542: Any person who commits an affront on public decency shall be punished by imprisonment of three months to two years and a fine of fifty thousand to two hundred and fifty thousand francs.

"Article 543: Any indecent offense, committed or attempted without violence or coercion, or surprise on the person of a minor under fifteen years of age, shall be punished with imprisonment of three to five years and a fine of fifty thousand francs to two hundred and fifty thousand francs or one of these penalties.

"Notwithstanding the heavier penalties provided in the preceding paragraph or Article 545 of this Code, shall be punished by imprisonment of six months to three years and a fine of fifty thousand to two hundred and fifty thousand francs anyone commits an indecent act or act against nature with an individual child of the same sex.

"However, indecent assault on a minor of fifteen years shall be punished by imprisonment of five to ten years and a fine of twenty thousand francs to one million francs or one of these two penalties only when it has been committed or attempted either with violence, coercion or surprise, or by legitimate, natural or adoptive guardian of the victim or by a person having control over him or her, or by two or more authors or accomplices or even by a person who has abused the authority conferred by his functions."

While the provision on indency is not specific to LGBTQ people, it has been used to prosecute same-sex conduct.

== Recognition of same-sex relationships ==
There is no recognition of legal rights for same-sex couples.

The government has recognized the same-sex relationships of members of the diplomatic corps attached to Benin by granting diplomatic visas and diplomatic immunity to the same-sex partners of foreign diplomats in Benin.

== Adoption ==
Article 96 of the Children's Code of Benin (Law 2015-08) states that full national adoption may be requested by married couples and by any single person. In addition, Article 104(d) on the "Criteria for Admission of an International Adopter" states that a foreign couple wishing to adopt a child with Beninese nationality must not be homosexual.

== Discrimination protections ==
There are limited protections based on sexual orientation and sexual life. There is no legal protection against discrimination based on gender identity.

- Article 394 on Sensitive Data of Law No. 2017-20 on the Digital Code in the Republic of Benin (2017), states: "The processing of personal data revealing racial or ethnic origin, political opinions, religion or beliefs, trade union membership, as well as the processing of genetic data, biometric data for the purpose of uniquely identifying a natural person, data concerning health or data concerning the sex life or sexual orientation of a natural person are prohibited."
- Article 23 of Law No. 2011-26 on the Prevention and Suppression of Violence Against Women (2012) states: "Business leaders must take all necessary measures to prevent, put an end to, and/or punish any verbal or non-verbal remarks, acts, or behaviors of a sexual or sexist nature, or any other behavior based on sex or taking into account real or perceived sexuality, intended or resulting in an infringement of the rights and dignity of women or girls, or the creation of an intimidating, hostile, degrading, humiliating, or offensive environment, including by informing employees, implementing investigative procedures, and taking precautionary measures." This provision is found in Chapter II on Labor Rights.
- Article 6 of the Personal Data Protection Law (2009) states: "It is prohibited, without the express consent of the person concerned, to collect or process personal data which reveal, directly or indirectly, racial or ethnic origins, political, philosophical or religious opinions, trade union membership of persons or data relating to the health and sexual life of such persons."

Article 36 of the Beninese Constitution says "Each Beninese has the duty to respect and to consider his own kin without any discrimination; and to keep relations with others that shall permit the safeguarding, the reinforcement and promotion of respect, dialogue and reciprocal tolerance with a view to peace and to national cohesion."

=== Hate speech ===
Article 552 on "Incitement to hatred and violence" of Law No. 2017-20 on the Digital Code in the Republic of Benin (2017), states: "Anyone who provokes discrimination, hatred, or violence against a person or group of persons based on opposition to race, color, racial or ethnic origin, religion, sexual orientation, or any other form of discrimination, by means of or on an electronic communications network or computer system, shall be punished by one (1) year of imprisonment and a fine of five million (5,000,000) CFA francs, or by one of these two penalties only."

== Blood donation ==
There are no specific restrictions for LGBT people according to Decree No. 1999-639 on the "Regulation of Whole Blood Donation and the Distribution of Blood and Blood Derivatives in the Republic of Benin", nor according to the National Blood Transfusion Agency.

== Living conditions ==
The U.S. Department of State's 2023 Human Rights Report found that, "The LGBTQI+ community, especially outside major urban areas, faced hostility, and discrimination against LGBTQI+ persons was common." The Benin Human Rights commission has reported concerns about arbitrary detention, physical and sexual violence, and degrading treament of LGBTQ+ people. Violence and anti-gay lynchings are also common in the country. Between 2020 and 2024, the LGBTQ organization Hirondelles Club has run 20 shelters housing 380 LGBTQ people. Most anti-LGBTQ violence is committed by civilians rather than state authorities. Police rarely go after perpetrators. Lesbian, bisexual, and queer women rarely report violence or discrimination to the police. Those who do conceal their sexual orientation or gender identity out of fear of mistreatment. The Beninese government accepted two of the fifteen recommendations they received following the 2023 Universal Periodic Review; one of those accepted was investigating and prosecuting violence against LGBTQ people, and the other was combatting stigma against HIV.

Homosexuality in Benin is perceived as unnatural and stemming from Western culture. Religion is a significant source of homophobia in the country. Catholic churches in the country bury LGBTQ people in separate cemeteries and priests calling transgender people demons. After a member of parliament allegedly called for gay inclusion in school curriculum, the Episcopal Conference of Benin said that homosexuality is against "cultural values and that it is not introduced into the Beninese educational system." Evangelical temples and Muslim mosques have also participated in homophobic preaching. Imams, priests, and traditional healers perform conversion therapy on LGBTQ people who are often coerced into it by their families.

LGBTQ people are frequently rejected by their families have difficulty getting jobs. Employers often will not hire people who are known to be LGBTQ, especially transgender and intersex people. This perpetuates homophobia as those who are financially secure tend to be judged less harshy for their sexuality.

Beninese LGBTQ people experience discrimination in healthcare. The government provides sexual and reproductive healthcare for people who experienced sexual violence, but LGBTQ people are typically denied medical care and social services. Healthcare providers regularly refuse to give treatments related to their LGBTQ status such as gender-affirming hormone therapy. They also regularly deny general healthcare like malaria treatment to LGBTQ people.

On May 17, 2013, the LGBTQ associations of Cotonou organized a public event in support of the International Day Against Homophobia, Biphobia and Transphobia at the Institut Français of Cotonou which drew a diverse audience of 200 people. While organizations can hold public events, most LGBTQ individuals do openly express their views due to social stigma.

== Summary table ==
Same-sex sexual activity legal	Yes (Always legal)
Equal age of consent	Yes (Since 2018)
Anti-discrimination laws in hate speech and violence	Yes (Since 2018)
Anti-discrimination laws in employment	No
Anti-discrimination laws in the provision of goods and services	No
Same-sex marriage	No
Recognition of same-sex couples	No
Step-child adoption by same-sex couples	No
Joint adoption by same-sex couples	No
Gays and lesbians allowed to serve openly in the military	No
Right to change legal gender	No
Access to IVF for lesbians	No
Commercial surrogacy for gay male couples	No
MSMs allowed to donate blood	Yes

== See also ==
- Human rights in Benin
- LGBTQ rights in Africa
- Human rights in Africa
