= Queer African Youth Network =

Feminist LGBTQ organization serving West Africa

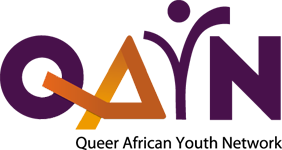
- Formation: 2010
- Type: LGBTQ+ organization
- Headquarters: Ouagadougou, Burkina Faso
- Region served: West Africa
- Website: https://qayn.org/

The Queer African Youth Network (abbreviated as QAYN) is a feminist and LGBTQ+ organization created in 2010. QAYN aims to establish support for LGBTQ+ peopls and advocates for their health and wellbeing in West Africa. The organization does research and advocacy training. QAYN is based in Ouagadougou, Burkina Faso. It has several member organizations with its network across various countries in West Africa.

== Partnerships and funders ==
The group was originally created online until their first on the ground member organization, Queer Alliance Nigeria, joined in late 2010. As of 2022, organizations in the Queer African Youth Network include Afro Benin, Elles Cameroon, Humantity First Cameroon, QET Inclusion (Ivory Coast organization), Sourire de Femme (Senegal organization) , and Ladies' Voice (Togo organization). QAYN receives funding from Foundation for a Just Society International. In 2017, QAYN received a $100,000 grant from the Open Society Foundations.

== Activities ==
As of 2013, QAYN has four paid staff members. However, the organization's volunteers are able to manage projects. In 2011, QAYN started the Q-Zine, a digital magazine ran by volunteers. QAYN provides activist mentorship and is one of few West African organizations mentoring trans men activists. Training efforts mainly focus on Francophone (French speaking) African countries since there is less structure and experience compared to Anglophone (English speaking) countries.

QAYN also performs research such as the 2015 study in Togo, Benin, Burkina Faso, and Cameroon called "Beyond Assumptions: Sexual Practices and Sexual and Reproductive Health Needs of Lesbians, Bisexual, Queer and Women who have Sex with Women (LBQWSW) in Francophone Sub-Saharab Africa." Areas of research include the medical, legal, and sociological field.

In February 2015, members of QAYN went to the U.S embassy in Burkina Faso after U.S ambassador Tulinabo S. Mushingi asked Chérif Sy about a drafted law that would criminalize homosexuality. Mushingi's comment was criticized since QAYN's strategy was to meet with officials privately to discuss the problems with the bill rather than start public debate. QAYN and ten other advocacy groups created a 14 page document about how the bill goes against Burkina Faso's laws treaty obligations.

In February 2017, QAYN and several other LGBTQ feminist organizations boycotted an LBT workshop in Cameroon. According to a statement by the boycotting organizations, there were several reasons for this. The original organizers were removed; a male-led French organization called Solidarité International LGBTQI designed and managed the workshop. The statement goes on to say Solidarité International LGBTQI was rejected by many local organizations in their attempts to "provide a local face for its implementation", until finally having Human Rights Cameroon facilitate the workshop. The boycotting organizations criticized the workshop as paternalistic and patriarchal, saying that local activists should have been involved in designing the workshop rather than just being invitees.

== See also ==
- Coalition of African Lesbians
- Initiative Sankofa d'Afrique de l'Ouest
- The Initiative For Equal Rights
