= LGBTQ rights in Madagascar =

- Madagascar
- Legal status: Legal since 1972, age of consent not equal
- Gender identity: Ambiguous
- Military: Ambiguous
- Discrimination protections: Limited protections

Family rights
- Recognition of relationships: No
- Adoption: No

Lesbian, gay, bisexual, transgender, and queer (LGBTQ) people in Madagascar face discrimination and legal challenges not experienced by non-LGBTQ residents. While same-sex sexual activity is legal among individuals above the age of 21, most civic liberties such as the rights to get married and adopt children are not afforded to LGBTQ individuals.

== Law regarding same-sex sexual activity ==
Same-sex sexual activity among persons at least 21 years of age is legal in Madagascar. The Penal Code provides for a prison sentence of two to five years and a fine of 2 to 10 million ariary (US$900 to US$4,500) for acts that are "indecent or against nature with an individual of the same sex under the age of 21".

== Recognition of same-sex unions ==
Madagascar does not recognise same-sex marriage or civil unions.

Article 2 of Law No. 2007-022 on Marriage and Matrimonial Regimes states that "Marriage between two persons of the same sex is prohibited, whether celebrated before the Civil Registrar or performed according to traditional ceremonies." In addition, Article 39 mentions "gender identity" as a cause for the absolute nullity of marriage.

== Adoption and family planning ==
Only married, heterosexual couples may adopt children in Madagascar.

Article 33 of Law No. 2005-014 on Adoption, states that "Full adoption is only permitted to heterosexual spouses."

== Discrimination protections ==
Madagascar law does not offer broad legal protection against discrimination on the basis of sexual orientation or gender identity. There are limited legal protections in specific laws.

- Act No. 2005-040 on the Fight against HIV/AIDS and the Protection of the Rights of people living with HIV/AIDS, states in article 17 that "In order to combat discrimination and stigmatization related to HIV/AIDS and to promote behavioral change, information, education and communication programs, adapted according to the age, gender, nature of activity and, where applicable, the sexual orientation of the target group, are developed and disseminated throughout the national territory by authorized structures." Article 26 states that "Special provisions are made to guarantee sufficient protection of vulnerable groups, especially sex workers, young people, women and children, drug addicts, men who have sex with men and mobile populations against the transmission of HIV/AIDS."
- Article 18 of Law No. 2014-038 on the Protection of Personal Data, states that "Due to the risk of discrimination and infringement of personal freedoms, any processing of sensitive data is prohibited. Sensitive data includes data revealing racial origin, biometric data, genetic data, political opinions, religious or other beliefs, trade union membership and data relating to the health or sexual life of individuals."
- Articles 45 and 67 of Law No. 2017-027 Relating to International Cooperation in Criminal Matters offers protections on the basis of sexual orientation.
- Article 2 of Law No. 2017-045 Governing the activity and supervision of Credit Information Bureaus protects sexual orientation as sensitive data.

=== Employment ===
Law No. 2024–014 on the Labor Code does not offer protection against discrimination based on sexual orientation and gender identity.

== Life conditions ==
The U.S. Department of State's 2011 Human Rights Report found that "[t]here was general societal discrimination against the LGBT community" and that "[s]exual orientation and gender identity were not widely discussed in the country, with public attitudes ranging from tacit acceptance to violent rejection, particularly of transgender sex workers". The report also found that, "LGBT sex workers were frequently targets of aggression, including verbal abuse, stone throwing, and even murder. In recent years, awareness of 'gay pride' increased through positive media exposure, but general attitudes have not changed."

In December 2019 a law was passed punishing gender-based violence. Nevertheless, the sociologist and former president of the National Council of Women of Madagascar, Noro Ravaozanany noted that "Malagasy society is not ready to move on the rights of homosexuals. Gender equality is already a challenge in 2020, even in intellectual circles".

In 2020, a 33-year-old woman was arrested for the statutory rape of a 19-year-old woman, after her mother filed a complaint. A law punishes "anyone who has committed an indecent or unnatural act with an individual of her sex, under the age of 21" with imprisonment. The mother wanted to take revenge for her daughter's decision to file a complaint against her father, who had raped her. A campaign to support the couple was organised on social networks, while Noro Ravaozanany declared that it was "scandalous that the mother did not defend her daughter against this incest. ... It was revenge on the part of the mother and a way to cover up the accusation of incest and rape". On social media, the couple's supporters were victims of insults and death threats; religious leaders, accused them of "promoting homosexuality" and also offered the young woman conversion therapy. Although homosexuality is not illegal in Madagascar, it remains as a sensitive issue which is strongly condemned by Malagasy society.

In early July 2021, the Malagasy government canceled an LGBTQ party held in a bar in Antananarivo, on the grounds of "incitement to debauchery".

== Summary table ==
Same-sex sexual activity legal	Yes (Since 1972)
Equal age of consent	No
Anti-discrimination laws in hate speech and violence	No
Anti-discrimination laws in employment	No
Anti-discrimination laws in the provision of goods and services	No
Discrimination law based on sexual orientation or gender identity	Yes / No (Limited)
Same-sex marriage	No
Recognition of same-sex couples	No
Step-child adoption by same-sex couples	No
Joint adoption by same-sex couples	No
Gays and lesbians allowed to serve openly in the military	Yes
Right to change legal gender	No
Access to IVF for lesbians	No
Commercial surrogacy for gay male couples	No
MSMs allowed to donate blood	No

== See also ==
- Human rights in Madagascar
- LGBTQ rights in Africa
