= LGBTQ rights in Guinea-Bissau =

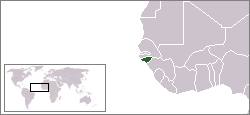
- Guinea-Bissau
- Legal status: Legal since 1993
- Gender identity: No
- Military: No
- Discrimination protections: Limited protection based on sexual orientation

Family rights
- Recognition of relationships: No recognition of same-sex unions
- Adoption: No

Lesbian, gay, bisexual, transgender, and queer (LGBTQ) people in Guinea-Bissau face legal challenges not experienced by non-LGBTQ residents. Same-sex sexual activity is legal in Guinea-Bissau, but same-sex couples and households headed by same-sex couples are not eligible for the same legal protections available to opposite-sex couples.

== Law regarding same-sex sexual activity ==
The colonial Penal Code, which remained in force after independence from Portugal, was repealed in 1993. The previous code did not explicitly criminalize same-sex acts but did penalize "vices against nature". The 1993 Code (Law-decree No. 4/93) which contains no provisions criminalising consensual same-sex sexual acts between adults.

In December 2008, Guinea-Bissau became one of 66 nations to sign the "United Nations Statement on Human Rights, Sexual Orientation and Gender Identity", which supports decriminalization of homosexuality and transgender identity.

== Recognition of same-sex relationships ==
The U.S. Department of State's 2011 Human Rights Report found that, "the law (in 2011) only recognized heterosexual married couples as entitled to larger government housing."

== Adoption and family planning ==
According to a website of the French government, single and married people are eligible to adopt children. The website does not say whether LGBTQ people are disqualified.

== Discrimination protections ==
Article 5 (Principle of equality) of Law against Domestic Violence (Law No. 6/2014) states that all victims, regardless of their sexual orientation, enjoy the fundamental rights inherent to human dignity, and are guaranteed equal opportunities to a life free from violence, as well as physical and mental health. Despite this, some hiring discrimination has been reported by LGBTQ+ people in the country.

== Living conditions ==
Of 19 African countries surveyed in 2010, Guinea-Bissau was one of the most tolerant about homosexual behavior. Nine percent in Guinea-Bissau said that homosexual behavior was morally acceptable, with fifteen percent saying it was not an issue.

The U.S. Department of State's 2012 human rights report found that,

There are no laws that criminalize sexual orientation. Antidiscrimination laws do not apply to lesbian, gay, bisexual, and transgender individuals. There were no reported violent incidents or other human rights abuses targeting individuals based on their sexual orientation or identity. There was no official discrimination based on sexual orientation or gender identity in employment or access to education and health care. However, according to government guidelines for civil servants' housing allowances, only heterosexual married couples were entitled to family-size housing, while same-sex couples received the single person allotment. Social taboos against homosexuality sometimes restricted freedom to express sexual orientation, yet society was relatively tolerant of consensual same-sex conduct, according to a 2010 study by the Pew Research Center.

In 2018, a local NGO director stated that there were some cases of violence targeting people based on their sexual orientation or gender identity and stressed that Guinea-Bissau lacks legal protections for LGBTI people.

== Summary table ==
Same-sex sexual activity legal	Yes (Since 1993)
Equal age of consent	Yes (Since 1993)
Anti-discrimination laws in hate speech and violence	No
Anti-discrimination laws in employment	No
Anti-discrimination laws in the provision of goods and services	No
Same-sex marriage	No
Recognition of same-sex couples	No
Step-child adoption by same-sex couples	No
Joint adoption by same-sex couples	No
Gays and lesbians allowed to serve openly in the military	No
Right to change legal gender	No
Access to IVF for lesbians	No
Commercial surrogacy for gay male couples	No
MSMs allowed to donate blood	Yes

== See also ==
- Human rights in Africa
- LGBTQ rights in Africa
