= LGBTQ rights in Guinea =

- Guinea
- Legal status: Illegal since 1988
- Penalty: 6 months to 10 years imprisonment, and a fine; maximum penalty imposed if committed with a person under 21 or by force
- Gender identity: No
- Military: No
- Discrimination protections: Limited protection based on sexual orientation

Family rights
- Recognition of relationships: No recognition of same-sex unions
- Adoption: No

Lesbian, gay, bisexual, transgender, and queer (LGBTQ) people in Guinea face legal challenges not experienced by non-LGBTQ residents. Both male and female expressions of same-sex sexual activity are illegal in Guinea, and discriminatory attitudes towards LGBTQ people are generally tolerated in the nation.

== Law regarding same-sex sexual activity ==
=== 1998 Penal Code ===
The 1998 Guinean Penal Code provides as follows:

- Article 325.

Any indecent act or act against nature committed with an individual of the same sex will be punished by imprisonment of six months to three years and a fine of 100,000 to 1,000,000 Guinean francs. If the act was committed with a minor under 21 years of age, the maximum sentence must be pronounced. If the act was consummated or attempted with violence or attempted violence, the guilty person will be condemned to five to ten years of imprisonment.

- Article 326.

A public indecency is defined as any intentional act committed publicly and likely to offend the decency and the moral sentiments of those who are its inadvertent witnesses.

- Article 327.

Any person that has committed a public indecency will be punished by three months to two years of imprisonment and a fine of 50,000 to 450,000 Guinean francs or simply by one of these two punishments.

When an indecent act is committed by a group of individuals, the penalties described in the first paragraph of the current article will be doubled.

=== 2016 Penal Code ===
The Guinean Penal Code was revised in 2016, but homosexuality remains criminalized. The minimum fine is greater comparer to the 1998 Penal Code. Article 274 of the 2016 Penal Code allows same-sex sexual conduct to be punished by either six months to three years in prison, a fine of 500,000 to 1,000,000 Guinean francs, or both.

=== Enforcement ===
These laws are used to justify arrests, and police officers will normally try to judge if a person is LGBTQ+ based on their clothing and appearance. Arrests rarely result in formal convictions since arrestees pay for their release. For years, police in Guinea have used the law as a means of extortion. In 2016 and 2017, the LGBTQ+ organization Afrique Arc-en-Ciel Conakry reported small numbers of gay men being taken to jail being fined for their release. A 2024 Universal Periodic Review stakeholder submission describes that LGBTQ+ people are held in custody for up to five days despite the 48 hour legal limit. They typically pay bribes or fines to escape to avoid stigma during legal proceedings.

In 2023, The Office for the Protection of Women, Children, and Morals added a unit to invesitage same-sex sexual conduct and other perceived moral offenses.

== Recognition of same-sex unions ==
There is no recognition of same-sex unions.

== Adoption and family planning ==
A couple married for a minimum of five years or an unmarried person who is at least 30 years of age is eligible to adopt a Guinean child if there is at least 15 years between the age of the child and the age of the adopting parent. Guinean law does not specifically make LGBTQ persons ineligible to adopt.

== Discrimination protections ==
There are no laws protecting LGBTQ people from discrimination in areas such as health, employment, and access to goods and services. However, there are other limited legal provisions that protect sexual orientation and sexual minorities.

- Law L/2016/037/AN Relating to Cybersecurity and the Protection of Personal Data in the Republic of Guinea, protects sexual orientation and sexual life as personal and sensitive data. Article 56 states: "Whoever, outside the cases provided for by this law, places or stores on a computer medium or memory, without the express consent of the person concerned, personal data which, directly or indirectly, reveal the origin, race, ethnicity, political, philosophical or religious opinions, or trade union membership, or which relate to the health or sexual orientation of the person concerned or to any other information inherent to them and of a sensitive or strictly personal nature, shall be punished by imprisonment of one (1) year to seven (7) years and a fine of 30,000,000 to 150,000,000 Guinean Francs or one of these two penalties only."
- Law L/2024/001/CNT/SGG of January 12, 2024, Relating to HIV Prevention, Care, and Protection of people living with HIV defines "Members of sexual minorities" as "individuals whose sexual orientation or identity falls outside the framework of heterosexuality, such as gays, lesbians, bisexuals, intersex, and transgender people, whether they identify as such or not." Also, it states that transgender is a "person whose sexual identity and expression do not conform to their birth sex and traditionally accepted norms."

Section 9.9.30(b) of the Guinea Aeronautical Regulations (2022) issued by the Ministry of Civil Aviation states that the competent government agencies will not use Passenger Name Record Data that reveals an individual's racial or ethnic origin, political opinions, religious or philosophical beliefs, trade union membership, or data concerning their health, sex life, or sexual orientation.

Ordinance No. 056/2009/PRG/SGG on the Prevention, Care, and Control of HIV/AIDS in the Republic of Guinea states that sexual minorities are individuals whose sexual orientation does not correspond to the heterosexual framework, such as men who have sex with men, lesbians, bisexuals, and intersex people and includes them as vulnerable and marginalized groups.

== Living conditions ==
The U.S. Department of State's 2011 Human Rights Report found that there were no LGBTQ+ organizations in the country. Furthermore, homosexuality was largely perceived as socially, religiously, and culturally taboo. Homosexuality was disliked politically as well. In 2010, Prime Minister Lansana Kouyate said during the opening of the Office of the High Commissioner for Human Rights in Conakry that he believed consentual same-sex sexual activity was wrong and should be illegal. He went on to say that sexual orientation should not be considered a human right.

The more recent 2023 Human Rights Report found that country did have groups representing LGBTQ+ people. The groups were unable to obtain legal recognition despite there being no law against such an organization being recognized. Cultural stigma persists and most people who are LGBTQ+ do not openly disclose that. Subsequently, there is no substantial political presence of openly LGBTQ+ people. LGBTQ+ people face discrimination when seeking housing, education, healthcare, or employment.

Public sentiment towards LGBTQ+ people is largely negative. A survey taken from 2021 to 2023 found that 87 percent of Guineans would either dislike or stongly dislike having a gay neighbor. LGBTQ+ people are seen as part of a Western imperalist agenda by the United States and France. Religious, cultural, and familial is pressure used in an attempt to convert LGBTQ+ people. This includes families arranging forced heterosexual marriages.

Security forces have arrested, harassed and been violent towards LGBTQ+ people, accusing them of disrupting the social order. Incarcerated LGBTQ+ people are frequently abused. Transgender women are incarcerated under the pretext of protecting them from community violence. They would then be put in male prisons where they often experienced sexual violence. LGBTQ+ Guineans have been internally displaced.They leave to avoid areas with religious and cultural norms that put their lives and well-being in danger.

== Summary table ==
Same-sex sexual activity legal	No (Penalty: Up to 10 years imprisonment and fines from 100,000 to 1,000,000 Guinean francs)
Equal age of consent	No
Anti-discrimination laws in employment only	No
Anti-discrimination laws in the provision of goods and services	No
Anti-discrimination laws in all other areas (Incl. indirect discrimination, hate speech)	No / Yes Limited protections.
Same-sex marriages	No
Recognition of same-sex couples	No
Step-child adoption by same-sex couples	No
Joint adoption by same-sex couples	No
Gays and lesbians allowed to serve openly in the military	No
Right to change legal gender	No
Access to IVF for lesbians	No
Commercial surrogacy for gay male couples	No
MSMs allowed to donate blood	No

== See also ==
- Human rights in Guinea

General:

- LGBTQ rights in Africa
- Human rights in Africa
