= LGBTQ rights in Seychelles =

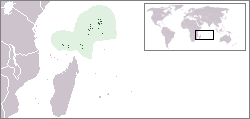
- Seychelles
- Legal status: Legal since 2016
- Gender identity: No
- Military: Yes (since 2016)
- Discrimination protections: Sexual orientation protections in employment (see below)

Family rights
- Recognition of relationships: No
- Adoption: No

Lesbian, gay, bisexual, transgender, and queer (LGBTQ) people in Seychelles are offered some legal protections, although LGBTQ people continue to face legal challenges not experienced by non-LGBTQ residents. Same-sex sexual activity has been legal since 2016, and employment discrimination on the basis of sexual orientation is banned in Seychelles, making it one of the few African countries to have such protections for LGBTQ people. However, LGBTQ people may nonetheless face stigmatisation among the broader population.

== Legality of same-sex sexual activity ==
Until June 2016, Section 151 of the Penal Code banned male same-sex intercourse with up to 14 years' imprisonment. Female same-sex sexual acts were not covered by Section 151 or any other criminal law of Seychelles.

In October 2011, the Seychellois Government agreed to decriminalise same-sex sexual acts "pretty soon, as the Government and civil society want so". On 29 February 2016, the Government decided to introduce a bill to this effect. The National Assembly was expected to consider the measure within a few months. Attorney General Ronny Govinden ruled out a referendum on the issue. The bill was approved on 18 May 2016, in a 14–0 vote. It was signed into law by President James Michel on 1 June, and took effect on 7 June 2016.

== Recognition of same-sex relationships ==
Seychelles does not recognise same-sex marriage or same-sex civil unions.

In June 2015, two men, a British national and a Seychellois national, were married at the British High Commission by Lindsay Skoll, the High Commissioner of Seychelles.

== Discrimination protections ==
The Employment Act, 1995 (French: Loi de 1995 sur l'emploi) prohibits employment discrimination on the basis of sexual orientation. This prohibition was added to the act in 2006. The Act provides as follows:

Section 2. In this act –

* * *

"harassment" means any such unfriendly act, speech or gesture of one person towards another person that is based on the other person's ... sexual orientation ... as would adversely affect the other person's dignity or make that person feel threatened, humiliated or embarrassed;

Section 46A. (1) Where an employer makes an employment decision against a worker on the grounds of the worker's ... sexual orientation ..., the worker may make a complaint to the Chief Executive stating all the relevant particulars.

== Hate crimes ==
On 18 September 2024, the Seychelles Parliament passed the Penal Code (Amendment) Act, which adds enhanced sentencing for crimes motivated by hatred of a "protected characteristic." Protected characteristics are defined in the bill as:

- (a) “race” includes colour, descent, ancestry, nationality, citizenship, ethnic or national origin;
- (b) “religious belief” includes both religious belief or lack thereof;
- (c) “disability” means physical or mental impairment of any kind;
- (d) “sexual orientation” means an individual’s capacity, or lack thereof, for physical, romantic or emotion attraction to, and intimate and sexual relations with individuals of a different gender, the same gender or multiple genders;
- (e) “gender identity” means a person’s internal and individual experience of gender, which may or may not correspond with the sex assigned at birth. This includes an individual’s personal sense of the body which may involve altering their bodily appearance or function through medical, surgical, or other means, as well as other expressions of gender including clothing, speech and mannerisms;
- (f) “sex characteristics” means variations in the sex development of a person, which can be physical, hormonal, chromosomal or genetic, and differs to what is generally expected of ‘males’ and ‘females’;
- (g) “political affiliation” means membership, close association or any outward support for a political party;
- (h) “HIV/AIDS status” means the status of a person with regards to the Human Immuno-deficiency Virus and Acquired Immune Deficiency.

The law also criminalises hate speech, meaning incitement to hatred based on a protected characteristic.

== Summary table ==
| Same-sex sexual activity legal | Yes (Since 2016) |
| Equal age of consent (15) | Yes (Since 2016) |
| Anti-discrimination laws in employment | Yes (Since 2006) |
| Anti-discrimination laws in the provision of goods and services | Yes (Since 2006) |
| Anti-discrimination laws in all other areas (incl. indirect discrimination, hate speech) | Yes (Since 2006) |
| Same-sex marriages | No |
| Recognition of same-sex couples | No |
| Stepchild adoption by same-sex couples | No |
| Joint adoption by same-sex couples | No |
| LGBTQ people allowed to serve openly in the military | Yes (Since 2016) |
| Right to change legal gender | |
| Access to IVF for lesbians | |
| Commercial surrogacy for gay male couples | |
| MSMs allowed to donate blood | Yes (There are no known bans or restrictions on blood donations from men who have sex with men in Seychelles) |

== See also ==
- Human rights in Africa
- LGBT rights in Africa
