= LGBTQ rights in the Democratic Republic of the Congo =

- Democratic Republic of the Congo
- Legal status: Legal
- Gender identity: No
- Military: No
- Discrimination protections: Limited protections

Family rights
- Recognition of relationships: No
- Restrictions: Same-sex marriage banned constitutionally since 2006
- Adoption: No

Lesbian, gay, bisexual, transgender, and queer (LGBTQ) people in the Democratic Republic of the Congo (DRC) face discrimination and legal challenges not experienced by non-LGBTQ residents. Same-sex sexual activity is legal for both males and females in the Democratic Republic of the Congo, although LGBTQ individuals may still be targeted for prosecution under public indecency provisions on occasion.

Homosexuality is generally considered immoral, a view espoused and promoted by church groups influential within the nation. The Congolese LGBTQ community experiences discrimination and hostility, and is commonly stigmatised by the wider community and officials. Same-sex couples, and households headed by same-sex couples, are not eligible for the same legal protections available to opposite-sex couples.

== Laws regarding same-sex sexual activity ==
Same-sex sexual activity is legal in the Democratic Republic of the Congo. Age of consent is equal, regardless of sex. Homosexual acts have never been explicitly outlawed in the country's history. Before the foundation of the state in 1960, the Democratic Republic of the Congo was ruled by the European colonial power Belgium. In Belgium, homosexual acts were decriminalized in 1794.

The U.S. Department of State's 2021 Human Rights Report found that individuals who publicly engaged in same-sex consensual activities, such as, for example, kissing, were sometimes prosecuted under public indecency provisions "which were rarely applied to opposite-sex couples."

== Recognition of same-sex relationships ==
There is no legal recognition of same-sex unions. There has been a constitutional ban on same-sex marriage, since 2006. The first paragraph of article 40, in the current Congolese constitution, states that "Every individual has the right to marry the person of their choice, of the opposite sex".

== Discrimination protections ==
There is no anti-discrimination law protecting sexual orientation and gender identity. There are limited legal provisions that protect homosexual people.

- Articles 3 and 4 of the Law on the Protection of the rights of people living with HIV/AIDS and of those affected (2008) prohibit acts of stigmatization and discrimination against people living with HIV/AIDS, their sexual partners, their children or parents based on their “proven or suspected HIV status”. Among those protected by the law under the category of “vulnerable groups”, Article 2(5) includes “homosexuals”.
- Article 132 of Law 20/017 on Telecommunications and Information and Communication Technologies (2020) states: "The collection and processing of personal data revealing racial, ethnic or regional origin, parentage, political opinions, religious or philosophical beliefs, trade union membership, sexual life, genetic data or, more generally, data relating to the state of health of the person concerned is prohibited."
- Article 245(2) of Law 23/10 on the Digital Code (2023) protects personal data revealing a person's sexual life or sexual orientation.

== Transgender rights ==
Trans women in the DRC are believed by many to be "sorcerers" and responsible for much of the country's ills, leading to significant violence and discrimination against them.

== Living conditions ==
The U.S. Department of State's 2021 Human Rights Report found that:

While no law specifically prohibits consensual same-sex sexual conduct between adults, individuals engaging in public displays of consensual same-sex sexual conduct, such as kissing, were sometimes subject to prosecution under public indecency provisions, which were rarely applied to opposite-sex couples. A local NGO reported authorities rarely took steps to investigate, prosecute, or punish officials who committed abuses against LGBTQI+ persons, whether in the security forces or elsewhere in the government.

Identifying as LGBTQI+ remained a cultural taboo. LGBTQI+ individuals were subjected to harassment, stigmatization, and violence, including "corrective" rape. Some religious leaders, radio broadcasts, and political organizations played a key role in supporting discrimination against LGBTQI+ individuals.

— Human Rights Practices Report: DRC (2021), US Department of State

In comparison, the State Department's report for 2010 said: "Homosexuality remained a cultural taboo, and while harassment by state security forces continued, there were no reports during the year of police harassing gays and lesbians or perpetrating or condoning violence against them."

== Summary table ==
Same-sex sexual activity legal	Yes (Always legal)
Equal age of consent	Yes (Since 2006)
Anti-discrimination laws in hate speech and violence	No
Anti-discrimination laws in employment	No
Anti-discrimination laws in the provision of goods and services	No
Same-sex marriage	No (Constitutional ban since 2006)
Recognition of same-sex couples	No
Step-child adoption by same-sex couples	No
Joint adoption by same-sex couples	No
Gays and lesbians allowed to serve openly in the military	No
Conversion therapy made illegal	No
Right to change legal gender	No
Access to IVF for lesbians	No
Commercial surrogacy for gay male couples	No
MSMs allowed to donate blood	No

== Public opinion ==
In 2014, 98% of Congolese said they were against same-sex marriage while only 2% supported it.

== See also ==
- Human rights in the Democratic Republic of the Congo
- LGBTQ rights in Africa
