= Drag in Africa =

The practice of drag in Africa allows Africans to challenge gender roles. There were many different expressions of masculinity and femininity in pre-colonial Africa. Colonial powers introduced written laws that enforced rigid gender roles that devalued women and femininity. African drag performers, specifically drag queens, now challenge this strict binary and its subsequent criminalization of queer people. Their performances navigate various intersectionalities of gender, sexuality, and race that are legacies of colonialism. Because of the association of drag with queerness, as well as its inherent challenge of the gendered social structure, drag performances are innately political and often dangerous.

== Drag as a performing art ==
As a point of departure, drag queens typically perform in front of audiences doing lip syncs or other comedy skits. Besides putting on a show with makeup, wigs, and other feminine items, drag is an art form that attempts to challenge the traditional gender binary that separates men and women. The gender binary between men and women has been enforced by gender norms or gender stereotypes that dictate the behaviors that are appropriate/necessary for men and women. Scholars note that drag steps outside of the confines of the gender binary and allows for the fluidity of gender expression.

When drag queens perform they're able to showcase their femininity and engage with the opposite gender in ways that are typically frowned upon. Drag is affected by the gender binary along with the various social constructions of gender because it conditions how individuals express themselves. In addition to challenging the traditional understanding of gender, scholars also note that drag enables queer men to step outside the confines of heteronormativity. The performance aspect of drag combines the gender and sexual fluidity that drag is based on into a uniquely subversive relationship that challenges the traditional norms upheld by society. Even as drag queens are on stage performing, they are breaking down the preconceived understandings of gender and gender expression that the audience might have. By embracing femininity, drag queens step outside the traditional gender binary and the social constructions of gender that significantly shaped how drag is perceived.

The fluidity of drag is especially important because it highlights the intersectionality between sexuality and gender. More specifically, drag queens actively change the ways in which gender, gender expectations, and masculinity/femininity are viewed and understood by society. As the understanding of drag and drag queens grow, there is more acceptance for the queer community and marginalized individuals who fall outside the scope of heteronormativity and the gender binary. Drag is especially important within African societies since it has been used as a method to explore homosexuality and varying African identities. Drag allows for the fusion of identities that otherwise wouldn't have been allowed to coexist. An African person is still African even if they do drag and they're queer. The notion of being "un-African" affects African drag queens, but the nature of drag encourages them to live their authentic lives and stories.

== Gender expression in pre-colonial Africa ==
Most pre-colonial African societies had a gender binary, but they did not devalue women and femininity. As a point of departure, politics were structured bicamerally, in a way for both men and women to be separate, but still share the same overall influence and power. This bicameralism was especially important because it valued both the feminine and masculine mindsets in tandem with one another. In some cases, African queens held more power than their male counterpart. Another important aspect of precolonial society was that African mothers were deeply revered for maintained culture through the upbringing of families, but while still actively participating in the labor force, politics, and other aspects of society.

African mothers and motherhood influenced gender within their own families, but also the community at large, which solidified their rights in the domestic sphere and beyond. Essentially, just because women were women did not mean that they were inferior, nor did men being men make them automatically superior. The familial structure is also contrast to the typical Western nuclear family structure that is more linear and closed off. Instead, precolonial African families looked towards the immediate family, but also the extended family as a way to determine identities and inheritance. Instead of viewing gender as a binary and imposing differences between men and women, like in the West, precolonial families viewed the genders through an equilibrium of both status and authority.

Gender expression often extends to sexual relations, and same-sex relations in Africa were common and not normally stigmatized nor criminalized, as documented by the Portuguese in modern-day Congo and Angola. Same-sex relations between women were very common, and some societies treated even treated men as women if they wanted to marry another man. These men, as documented among the Langi in modern-day Uganda, dressed and acted in a way that modern societies may label as "drag" or "transgender." These terms did not exist back then and are therefore not accurately descriptive of the gender expressions of these men because the men did not often live the lifestyle modern labels imply. For instance, the murumekadzi, or the man-woman, of the Shona people were men who took on the communal roles done by women because they were mediums for female spirits, but they still married women and had children. It was also common for men to act as women in dance performances, even when the purpose and physicality of the dance was highly erotic and sensual.

There were no written laws in Africa before colonization, but there were complex and enforced social laws across the continent that governed sexual relations. as the majority of African societies placed high value on reproduction and lineage. Oral law can be distinguished from written law because it's more fluid and it evolves from how individuals in a society as a collective understand behaviors/norms that then become associated with sanctions. There is no record of same-sex relationships and fluid gender expressions being punished under oral law, but they were also not encouraged, creating a passive tolerance of queerness, but didn't persecute it either.

== Colonial laws and attitudes on gender expression ==
Colonial powers introduced written criminal legal codes to Africa, many of which criminalized same-sex relationships. These written laws were more rigid and pose long term effects that shapes society's attitudes towards different social identities. This in turn inherently affected drag and drag queens because of its association with gay men and their ability in stepping outside the traditional confines of gender and sexuality. Britain specifically tailored the code to its colonies rather than implementing its own existing laws on colonial subjects, making it much more likely for former British colonies to remove the codes after independence. Some scholars believe these laws were introduced inadvertently as they were never enforced. However, Uganda adopted its own criminal code based on Australia which enhanced the punishment for same-sex relations. Therefore, other scholars believe there was a distinct intention to criminalize homosexuals among colonial powers. They are argue that written laws criminalizing queer people, even if they're not actively enforced, intend to criminalize queerness, which feeds into greater intolerance of social identities that aren't perceived as "normal".

Colonial rule, along with the laws imposed during that time, proved to be consequential for the shifting the gender dynamics between men and women along with the overall understanding associated with both. Colonialism took away the respect and status given to women, which made them to be treated with less importance than their male counterpart. Even more so, women were stripped away of their economic independence by being targeted by gendered financial constraints like heavy taxation and bride wealth. Women becoming economically disadvantaged, being denied from education, labor, politics, etc. was the result of masculinity and men being uplifted. Since most aspects of society were being centered around men and making them superior, women and their femininity was found increasingly at odds. The strict Western mindsets regarding gender was imposed on Africans because it was considered to make them moral and appropriate. Even the terms "men" and "women", which categorize individuals based on anatomy, aren't used in the same capacity in Bantu languages. Within Bantu speaking languages, in order to consider someone anatomically a "female", that individual was achieve certain things, like having a first child, becoming a grandmother, or completing important ceremonies. The Western understanding of gender posed a rigidity that disregarded women's social positions/status and instead confined them to specified gender expectations that was now purely based on one's anatomy.

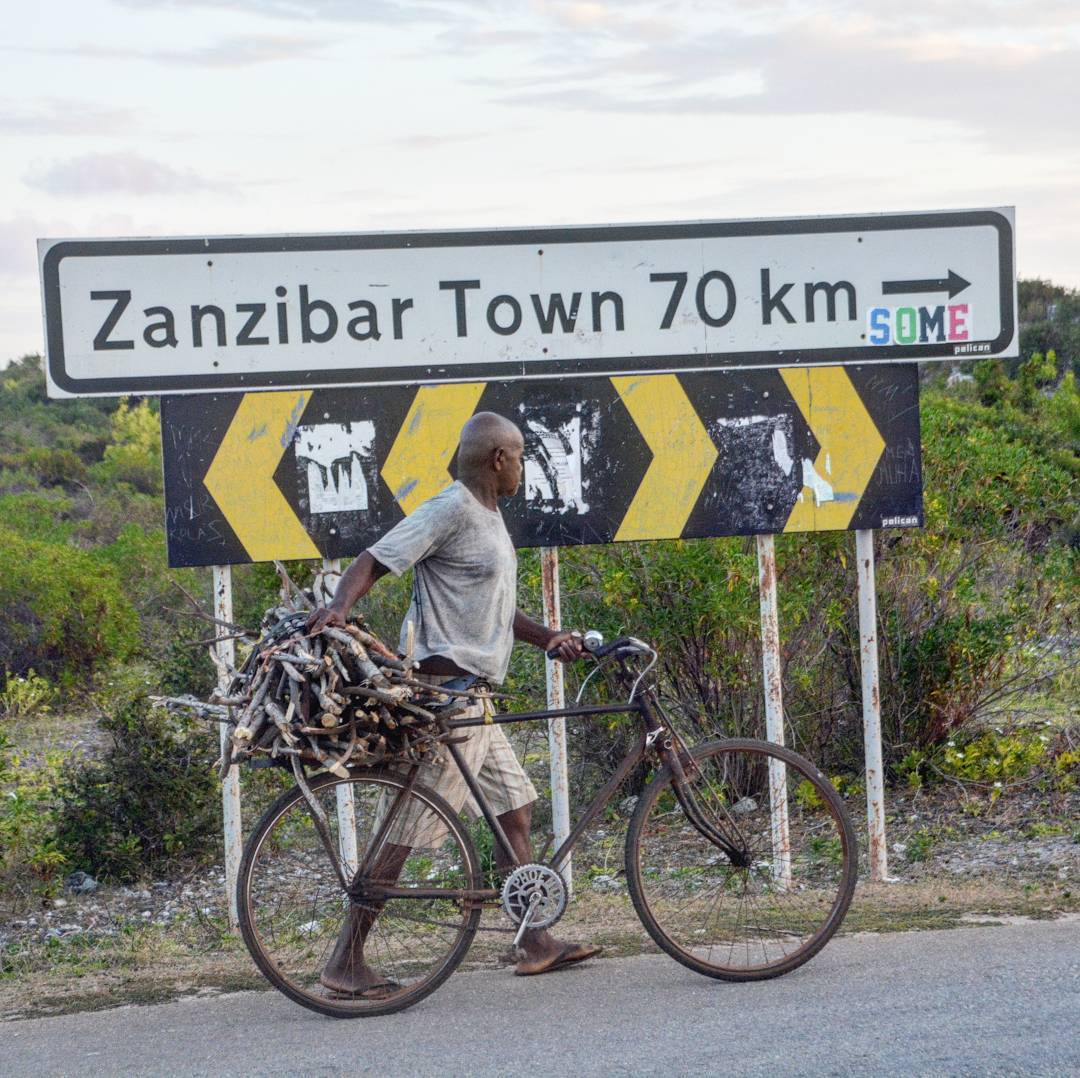
Zanzibar Town, where the Mwaka Kogwa annual celebration is held.

Even under colonial rule, Africans still engaged with gender fluidity and continued to step outside of the traditional gender binary that was enforced. In particular on the East African coast and within Swahili speaking societies, there are "mashogas", which are considered the English equivalent of a drag queen. Mashogas are described as "passive" homosexual men who dress up in women's clothing for social or ritual gatherings. More specifically, in Zanzibar in Makunduchi, the Mwaka Kogwa is a New Year's festival where men and women come together and settle grievances from the past year and welcome the a new harvest season. Central parts of the festivities, which involves thousands of participants and spectators, include healing ceremonies, men hitting each other with banana leaves as a way to get rid of tension, men who performed dances as women, and mashogas as well. The men who were dressed as women in the event weren't necessarily mashogas themselves, which demonstrates the fluidity of gender expression. Challenging gender norms in relation to social organization and colonial gender expectations allowed Africans to still practice a social order in which events like the Mwaka Kogwa thrive and men can engage with femininity in any way they desire. Although mashogas were viewed as a social category, they also participated in professional categories since they were contracted to perform at the women's celebrations in weddings. Furthermore, mashogas would play the pembe, which is considered a woman's instrument, perform women's dances, and despite still being biologically "men" they would permeate spaces that were segregated on the basis of gender and sex. Lastly, during the Islamic holiday, Eid Al Hajj, men would dress up as women despite not being mashogas. This connects back to the Mwaka Kogwa celebration because of the gender fluidity that didn't confine men and women to the rigid colonial gender expectations/norms. Men being able to dress as women without being considered a mashoga highlights how individuals could simply live their lives according to how they desired. Although the presence of mashogas in East Africa during colonial rule might show a tolerance towards gender expression and drag queens, mashogas were mainly recognized in Zanzibar, which is a semi-autonomous coastal region off the coast of Tanzania.

== Contemporary drag ==
Modern anti-gay laws are inherited from colonial law. For example, the modern anti-sodomy laws in Namibia have their origins in the colonial period and even after independence in 1990, the anti-sodomy laws remained, which has contributed to generations of anti-queer attitudes and intolerance in the country. Many anti-gay laws that stigmatize visual expressions of queerness like drag have been revitalized or recently more enforced. However, some countries have chosen to continuing enforcing the colonial-era laws and others have not.

Scholars have cited different reasons for the new passages and/or enforcement of these laws. Many believe it is backlash to the growing international gay rights movement, especially from religious communities. Other believe it is a reaction to Western influences as many conservative African figures link gay rights with cultural imperialism and describe the laws as protection of "Africanism." The connection between gay rights and the West is encouraged by American evangelical groups that have increased their funding of anti-gay churches in Africa. The laws and the increasing social hostility place drag queens in danger as pastors associate their gender performance with oppressive colonial culture. Politically, African leaders justify the anti-gay policies to international human rights activists by blaming the gay community for HIV transmission, which has swept through Africa. control, as many communities strongly associated the virus with gay men. Therefore, drag performers are often see as threats to community.

=== South Africa ===
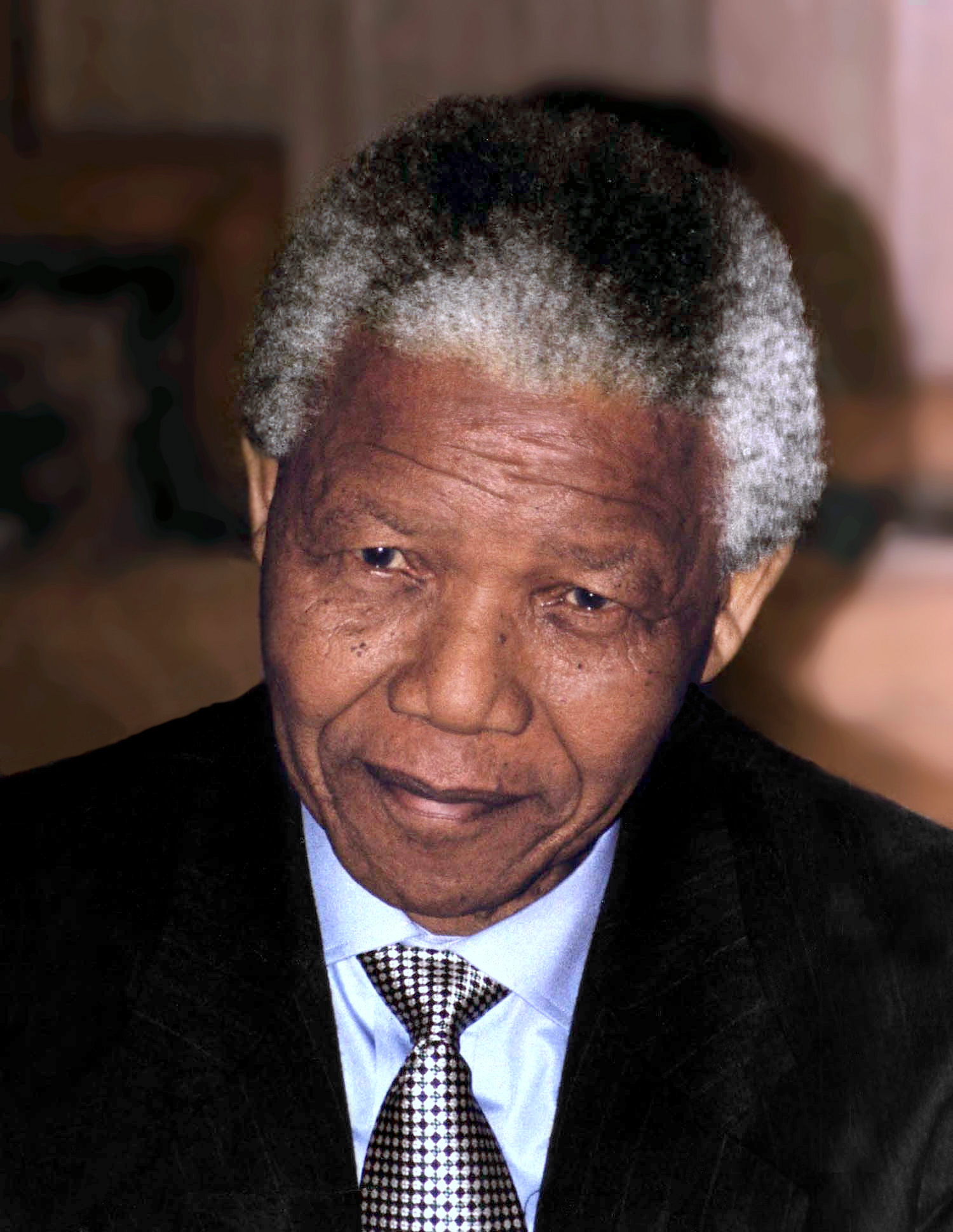
Nelson Mandela in 1994, forming the "Rainbow Coalition" with the help of Evita Bezuidenhout

Because of South Africa's colonial history and its former structures of apartheid, many of its contemporary drag artists feature themes of race and gender in their performances. Drag artists were prominent in the South African public's transition from apartheid to the new government in the early 1990s, specifically the artist Pieter-Dirk Uys as the character Evita Bezuidenhout. "Evita" is an Afrikaner woman who formerly served as a government overseer of the apartheid structure but embraced the new government after her daughter marries and has children with a black man. She is an imperfect and blundering woman struggling to know her place as a white woman without structural racism, and through this humorous performance, she creates a new model of whiteness that moves her white audience through their power loss and to a hopeful future. She often goes to majority-black areas to allow black audiences to laugh at their oppressors, as the act of drag neutralizes the racist, blundering, and offensive nature of Evita. The queerness of the performance creates an air of confusion and catches people off guard, so Evita can successfully penetrate deep racial issues with humor and ease. This gender performance, though exaggerated, makes Evita seem real and therefore critique how banal apartheid's evil was. Evita played a central part in get-out-the-vote campaigns before the 1994 election and interviewed Nelson Mandela.

Steven Cohen also uses drag to comment of South Africa's existing racism. Their eccentric, outlandish, and often disgusting performances portrays whiteness as monstrous and "other" in an African setting in light of apartheid othering black bodies. Cohen's performances are interventions and interactions with specific audiences to visualize whiteness's legacy.

Many drag artists use their performance to reject beliefs in their communities that they interpret as homophobic, transphobic, racist, and otherwise oppressive. Some use ethnic and indigenous practices to address their communities. Belinda Qaqamba Ka-Fassie intertwines her cathartic pageantry with her Xhosa identity, wearing cultural garments traditionally worn by one gender. Her drag is a protest of the homophobia and racism that permeate South Africa society, as well as the lack of understanding and language to describe queerness in Xhosa communities.

Other artists use drag to challenge the international belief that South Africa is an inclusive society for LGBT+ people. Sharika Mabika, a transgender refugee from Zimbabwe, uses drag to describe her disappointment with the oppression she faces in South Arica and the inaction by the government to address her community's needs. Many of these artists distinguish their drag from Western conceptions because their experiences in townships inherently ties their performances to their identities as impoverished, black South Africans.

=== Kenya ===
The majority of drag performers in Kenya meet and perform secretly because drag is often a visible expression of queerness. Kenya has incredibly strict anti-gay laws that put the performers in danger of imprisonment and/or violence. However, getting inspiration from other African countries like South Africa and Western drag shows like RuPaul's Drag Race, several gay centers have begun holding public drag shows to celebrate their culture. The popularity of RuPaul and Kenyan drag stars like Mercedes Iman Diamond have made the public more open to accepting drag as a form of entertainment, though this acceptance is usually only concentrated in urban centers and is not widespread.

=== Cameroon ===
Because drag is often interpreted as a visual expression of queerness, there are less drag queens who perform in countries like Cameroon with strict anti-queer laws. People who come out or are suspecting of being gay can be and are criminally punished. Many gay Cameroonians live in fear of state or communal retaliation at their identity. As a result, many Cameroon drag artists feel more comfortable performing in other countries. For example, Bebe Zahara Benet, a drag performer who won the 1st season of the American drag competitive TV show RuPaul's Drag Race, lives in the United States full time. When the artist, whose name off-stage is Nea Marshall Kudi Ngwa, returns to his home country, he does not perform or advertise his drag persona, "go[ing] very incognito," to avoid "dangerous or unfortunate" situations. However, when in America, BeBe does virtually meet with gay Cameroonians to offer her support, but her resistance to sexuality labels such as "straight" and "gay" puts her life in danger when back home.

=== Zambia ===
Since Zambia has maintained anti-gay laws, drag queens have not had the opportunity to have the same presence. Zambia continues to operate from the rigid colonial laws that criminalized homosexuality and allowed for the intolerance of LGBTQ+ people to flourish. This has contributed to the modern day intolerance that subjects queer individuals to hate crimes, severe discrimination, and overall marginalization. Because the queer community is criminalized, and there is a strong connection between the queer and drag communities, drag queens aren't able to perform as freely as they might otherwise.

=== Drag kings ===
While drag queens are much more common than drag kings, there are still women who participate in masculine drag performances. The majority of the anti-gay, and by association anti-drag, sentiments are targeted at men who embrace femininity, resisting the gender roles which devalue femininity. Drag kings also face backlash for challenging gender roles as they are interpreted as challenging men's monopoly on economic power by embracing masculinity. Especially in countries like Malawi, Mali, and the Democratic Republic of the Congo that have increasing disputes over land, a family's property is traditionally passed to the eldest son.

Drag kings are often perceived as women who threaten this system. However, drag kings have found areas to perform that their communities deem acceptable. For instance, amongst the La Sape community in the Democratic Republic of the Congo, women have joined the once all-men group since the 1980s. Members of the group follow a specific dress code and compete against each other for the best catwalk. While the men dress the formal attire inspired by colonial dress to retake their power from their European "masters", the women, or sapeuses, push back against the colonial devaluing of women and its persistence in modern Congolese society. However, because these performances are done within an existing, accepted culture, the women are not seen as prominent threats to social structure like other drag kings.

== See also ==
- Colonial roots of gender inequality in Africa
