= LGBTQ rights in Togo =

- Legal status: Illegal since 1980
- Penalty: 1-3 years imprisonment and fines. (repeal proposed)
- Gender identity: No
- Military: No
- Discrimination protections: Limited protection against homophobic defamation

Family rights
- Recognition of relationships: Unknown
- Adoption: Unknown

Lesbian, gay, bisexual, transgender, and queer (LGBTQ) people in Togo face legal challenges not experienced by non-LGBTQ residents. Both male and female forms of same-sex sexual activity are illegal in Togo, with no legal recognition for same-sex marriage or adoption rights.

== Laws criminalizing LGBTQ conduct ==
While it was the German Empire protectorate Togoland, same-sex sexual activity was made illegal in 1884. The German Empire lost control of Togoland in 1916.

Same-sex sexual activity continued to be illegal in Togo via the Penal Code of 13 August 1980, with a penalty of one to three years imprisonment and a fine of 100,000 to 500,000 CFA francs. (Note: The official text of Article 88 in French (Code pénal): Sera puni d'un emprisonnement d'un à trois (03) ans et d'une amende de 100 000 à 500 000 francs quiconque aura commis un acte impudique ou contre nature avec un individu de son sexe.) In 2015, a new Penal Code was adopted. Instead of using the phrase "crimes against nature", same-sex intimacy was mentioned with the more direct phrasing saying "indecent or unnatural act committed with a person of the same sex." The prison sentence duration remained the same, but Article 393 increased the fine to one to three million CFA francs.

LGBTQ advocacy has been criminalized with spoken words, writing, or images perceived as violating public decency being criminalized in Article 392 of the Penal Code. LGBTQ organizations are allowed to register as health organizations, but not as LGBTQ advocacy organizations.

=== Enforcement ===
There have been several cases of arbitrary arrests of LGBTQ citizens. Seemingly neutral laws such as loitering and immorality laws have been disproportionately used against LGBTQ people. A transgender person was arrested in March 2018 for supposed cross-dressing despite there being no law explicitly against it. In January 2021, a gay man escaping an ambush was arrested and suspected of committing theft. After explaining the situation, he and his partner were imprisoned until the LGBTQ organization Afrique Arc-En-Ciel paid for their release. In 2023, Bobo Períta, a TikTok influencer known for cross-dressing, was arrested for violating public decency. He was convicted on June 1 that year and was sentenced to a civil prison in Lomé.

== Recognition of LGBTQ people and families ==
There is no legal way to change one's gender on government documents. According to a website of the French government, single and married people are eligible to adopt children. The website does not say whether LGBTQ people are disqualified.

== Discrimination protections ==
There are no broad legal protections against discrimination based on sexual orientation or gender identity. However, Article 5 of the Press and Communications Code (Law 2020-001) defines defamation as a "false accusation that damages a person's honor and reputation. Defamation can be racist, sexist, or homophobic." The law prohibits the dissemination of defamatory comments and defamatory advertising messages.

Article 17 of Decree No. 2023-116/PR "Relating to the Collection, Transfer, Processing, and use of Passenger Data" states that "the screening of passengers by the Passenger Information Unit, prior to their scheduled arrival or departure from Togolese territory, is carried out according to pre-established criteria and in a non-discriminatory manner. These pre-established criteria must be specific, proportionate, and targeted (...) These criteria are in no way based on a person's racial or ethnic origin, political opinions, religion or philosophical beliefs, trade union membership, health status, sexual life, or sexual orientation." In addition, articles 27 and 39 protect a person's sexual orientation when processing data.

While there is no official ban on nonconsensual surgeries intended to normalize intersex people's appearance, it is not endorsed by healthcare providers or medical associations within the country. There were no known reports of such surgeries occurring as of 2023.

== Living conditions ==
No law protects persons from discrimination based on sexual orientation or gender identity. Religion plays a significant role in the stigmatization of LGBTQ people. The Catholic Church and bishops are highly regarded in Togo and have political and moral influence. Bishops have blame misfortunes and disasters on homosexuality. Religious programs are used to perform conversion therapy. Prison chaplains have refused to give communion to LGBTQ prisoners who have not repented for their homosexuality.

In 2020, there were 33 reported instances of human rights violations towards LGBTQ people in Togo. This is most likely a small fraction of overall cases. Victims are detered from reporting due to social stigma and possible legal consequences from the criminalization of homosexuality and LGBTQ advocacy. Mistreatment of LGBTQ people whether by civilians or state authorities tends to go unpunished.

Togolese LGBTQ people are subject to intimidation, death threats, and physical assault. In November 2019, a transgender person was followed home by police who refused to let her go until she had sex with them; the presence of the victim's mother prevented her from sexual assault. In April 2022, a group of gay men at a Lomé beach were physically assaulted and chased out by mob for effeminate behavior. One of the men later went missing after receiving several death threats. In May that same year, a man assumed to be gay was filmed being stripped naked and beat up; the video was posted to social media.

LGBTQ people experience discrimination in employment, housing, education, and healthcare. LGBTQ people have been refused housing, rejected by their families, and denied healthcare. Healthcare providers at HIV and STD treatment centers often discriminate against LGBTQ patients. This results in LGBTQ people avoiding treatment centers. Laws around LGBTQ advocacy prevent messaging aimed towards mem who have sex with men. LGBTQ prisoners in the country are denied HIV/AIDS treatment and access to condoms. People with HIV face further societal discrimination such as being kicked out by family members or having their illness viewed as moral punishment.

== Summary table ==
Same-sex sexual activity legal	No (Penalty: 3 years imprisonment with fines, repeal proposed)
Equal age of consent	No
Anti-discrimination laws in employment only	No
Anti-discrimination laws in the provision of goods and services	No
Anti-discrimination laws in all other areas (Incl. indirect discrimination, hate speech)	No
Discrimination law based on sexual orientation or gender identity	Yes (Since 2020)
Same-sex marriages	No
Recognition of same-sex couples	No
Step-child adoption by same-sex couples	No
Joint adoption by same-sex couples	No
Gays and lesbians allowed to serve openly in the military	No
Right to change legal gender	No
Access to IVF for lesbians	No
Commercial surrogacy for gay male couples	No
MSMs allowed to donate blood	No

== See also ==
- Human rights in Togo
- LGBTQ rights in Africa
