= LGBTQ rights in Ivory Coast =

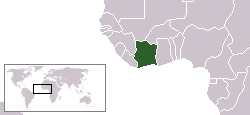
- Ivory Coast
- Legal status: Legal; unequal age of consent
- Gender identity: No
- Military: No
- Discrimination protections: No

Family rights
- Recognition of relationships: No
- Adoption: No

Lesbian, gay, bisexual, transgender, and queer (LGBTQ) people in the Ivory Coast face legal challenges not experienced by non-LGBTQ residents, although it is more tolerant of LGBTQ rights than some other neighboring nations. Same-sex sexual activity is legal for both men and women in Ivory Coast, but same-sex couples and households headed by same-sex couples are not eligible for the same legal protections available to opposite-sex couples.

== Laws regarding same-sex sexual activity ==
Consensual same-sex sexual acts between adults in private are legal and have never been criminalized within Ivory Coast, due in part to Ivory Coast being a former French colony and not inheriting sodomy laws from France, unlike many former British colonies around the world.

As for public same-sex sexual acts, Article 360 of the Penal Code states this: (Note: The official text of Article 360 in French (Article 360, Section 3 – Outrage Public à la Pudeur, Chapitre Il – Attentat aux Mœurs, Code Pénal): Est puni d'un emprisonnement de trois mois à deux ans et d'une amende de 50 000 à 500 000 francs quiconque commet un outrage public à la pudeur. Si l'outrage public à la pudeur consiste en un acte impudique ou contre nature avec un individu du même sexe l'emprisonnement est de six mois à deux ans et l'amende de 50 000 à 300 000 francs. Les peines peuvent être portées au double si le délit a été commis envers un mineur ou en présence d'un mineur de dix huit ans [sic].)

Est puni d'un emprisonnement de trois mois à deux ans et d'une amende de 50 000 à 500 000 francs quiconque commet un outrage public à la pudeur. Si l'outrage public à la pudeur consiste en un acte impudique ou contre nature avec un individu du même sexe l'emprisonnement est de six mois à deux ans et l'amende de 50 000 à 300 000 francs. Les peines peuvent être portées au double si le délit a été commis envers un mineur ou en présence d'un mineur de dix huit ans.

Translation:

Whoever commits a public breach of decency will be punished with imprisonment for three months to two years and a fine of 50,000 to 500,000 francs. If the public breach of decency consists of an act that is indecent or contrary to nature with an individual of the same sex, the term of imprisonment will be from six months to two years and the fine will be from 50,000 to 300,000 francs. The penalties may be doubled if the crime is committed against a minor or in the presence of a minor of 18 years of age.

Furthermore, as per Articles 358 and 359 of the Penal Code, the age of consent is unequal, being set at 18 for homosexual couples and at 15 for heterosexual ones.

== Recognition of same-sex relationships ==
The government of Ivory Coast does not recognize same-sex couples.

== Adoption and family planning ==
According to the U.S. Department of State, "gay and lesbian individuals and couples are not legally recognized as eligible to adopt".

== Discrimination protections and government involvement ==
There is no legal protection against discrimination based on sexual orientation or gender identity.

However, in March 2010, while attending the United Nations Human Right Council Universal Periodic Review, the representative of Ivory Coast stated that they would begin, "to take measures to ensure non-discrimination on grounds of sexual orientation and gender identity", but that they would not start "awareness-raising programs" because it was not a "current priority".

The Ivorian government is largely neutral about LGBTQ issues. In 2024, however, President Ouattara promised to introduce a bill to Parliament to "counter the expansion" of homosexuality. The same year, the country's National Human Rights Council called on the public to refrain from online hatred and violence toward woubis (gay men and trans women) and lelés (lesbians and trans men). The council said in a September 2024 press release that "despite their different sexual orientation and contrary to our customs and traditions, the members of this ‘woubi’ community remain above all human beings and benefit from the human rights enshrined in the Ivorian Constitution and international human rights treaties."

== Living conditions ==
In Ivory Coast, sexual minorities, transgender, and gender non-conforming people are seen as abnormal and their identies are perceived as stemming from the Global North. LGBTQ people are subject to violence. Transgender women and other feminine presenting people assigned male at birth are at especially high risk of violence. Their gender expression breaks social norms, drawing more hostile attention towards them. As of 2023, state authorities are slow and sometimes ineffective at managing violence from civilians, but may be improving. According to the Ivorian non-governmental organization Fondygender, authorities have gotten better at being more understanding and handling complaints from LGBTQ people. However, many LGBTQ do not report violence or threats against their life or safety to police, believing they will not be taken seriously. These fears are corroborated by reports of police not taking violence seriously and often blaming the victims.

Violence rose in the city of Abidjan in 2024. Between early September and late October, 45 incidents of assaults against LGBTQ people according to the LGBTQ group Gromo. Social media influencers have called for violence against gay people. Misinformation spread across social media including the hoax that French President Macron asked Ivorian President Ouattara to make same-sex marriage legal. A group of young men committed a homophobia motivated attack at a market that employed gay hair stylists. LGBTQ people in the city of Abidjan continued to avoid going out during the day and meeting publicly after the uptick in violence settled. LGBTQ people in the country are hypervigilant to keep themselves safe. Wealthier LGBTQ tend to be treated with less hostility. Professionals from Nigeria, Ghana, Morocco, Tunisia migrate to the Ivory Coast because their professional status improves their safety.

Touré Claver, president of the LGBTQ group Alternative Côte d'Ivoire, recalled in September 2011 that a doctor refused service a few years ago to a patient because of the patient's sexual orientation. Claver and a few members of the group then protested outside the healthcare center where the doctor worked, eventually ending with the patient receiving care. Claver stated that overall, "There is still discrimination against gay people, but generally we are moving toward relative tolerance."

According to the U.S. State Department's 2023 report, Ivorian LGBTQ people continue to face discrimination in healthcare, housing, and employment. LGBTQ people are often evicted or kicked out by their families, causing LGBTQ youth to drop out of school. Many transgender people lack secure housing. Employers may refuse to hire or promote LGBTQ workers or fire a worker if they are discovered to be LGBTQ. Conversion therapy was reported to have occurred that year including a transgender man attempting suicide after being forced to attend prayer camp. A vocal minority of Muslim and Christian religious leaders frequently preach against the LGBTQ community.

== History ==
LGBTQ visibility in West Africa greatly increased in the 1990s. In 1994, a miltant group of transvestis, an Ivorian term for transgender and otherwise gender non-conforming people assigned male at birth, had attacked a newspaper headquarters for sarcastic reporting. They broke windows and assaulted journalists. This led to the formation of the association Transvesti Association of Ivory Coast. A film about gay men and transvestis called Woubi Chéri came out in 1998 and offered insight into their lives. Overtime, transvesti militancy faded as focus shifted to men who have sex with men (MSM). MSM became prioritized by non-profit organizations, particularly in regards to HIV. While many transvesti engage in sex work and are also a vulnerable population, they received little attention. Other LGBTQ non-profits stigmatization them with Claver from Alternative criticizing transvesti for their gender presentation.

There was an increased in violence towards LGBTQ people following the 2010 presidential election. Former president Laurent Gbagdo refused to step down after Alassane Ouattara was declared the winner, leading to Second Ivorian Civil War (2010-2011). The U.S. Department of State's 2011 Human Rights Report found that

...societal stigmatization of the LGBT community was reportedly widespread, and the government did not act to counter it during the year. Gay men were reportedly subjected to beatings, imprisonment, verbal abuse, humiliation, and extortion by police, gendarmes, and members of the armed forces. During the year the Force Republiques de Côte d'Ivoire (FRCI) reportedly beat and abused gay men and transgender persons, most of them sex workers. Complaints were not filed for fear of reprisals. The situation of the LGBT community reportedly improved after the postelectoral crisis but remained precarious. The few LGBT organizations in the country operated with caution to avoid being targeted by the FRCI and former Forces de Défense et de Sécurité members.

FRCI fighters tended to be more aggressive to transvesti than those fighting under Gbagdo, though both targetted LGBTQ people. Transvesti sex workers had to avoid certain areas as conflict rose, and were several incidents of violence against them. Many FRCI fighters were largely Muslim and from the northern part of the country. Many had never seen a major city, so when they traveled to Abidjan they had no prior interactions with transvestis.

As tensions settled, violence reduced to primarily shake-downs. In 2012, a bar frequented by gender and sexual minorities called Le Club was raided several times by FRCI members. They mainly targetted effeminate men and transvestis. The FRCI members would force them into a cargo truck, sometimes force them to take off their clothes, and demand a significant fine under threat of being taken back to their bases if they didn't comply.

Though non-transvesti sexual minorities were not aware of the violence towards transvestis for months after the conflict, the numerous acts of overt violence increased their awareness. After the raid of Le Club, many gay men became alerted to severity of violence towards transvestis. This pushed some in the queer community to be more accepting of tranvestis. Alternative hired a transvesti employee in 2012. The French embassy granted Alternatives and other organizations grant funding towards helping the LGBTQ community, including the transvesti community.

== Summary table ==
Same-sex sexual activity legal	Yes (Always legal)
Equal age of consent	No
Anti-discrimination laws in hate speech and violence	No
Anti-discrimination laws in employment	No
Anti-discrimination laws in the provision of goods and services	No
Same-sex marriage	No
Recognition of same-sex couples	No
Step-child adoption by same-sex couples	No
Joint adoption by same-sex couples	No
Gays and lesbians allowed to serve openly in the military	No
Right to change legal gender	
Access to IVF for lesbians	No
Commercial surrogacy for gay male couples	No
MSMs allowed to donate blood	No

== See also ==
- LGBT rights in Africa
- Human rights in Africa
