= LGBTQ rights in Djibouti =

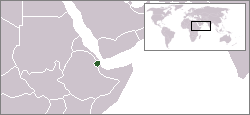
- Djibouti
- Legal status: Not explicitly legal
- Gender identity: No
- Military: No
- Discrimination protections: Limited protection based on sexual orientation

Family rights
- Recognition of relationships: No
- Adoption: No

Lesbian, gay, bisexual, transgender, and queer (LGBTQ) people in Djibouti face legal challenges not experienced by non-LGBTQ residents. Although Djibouti does not explicitly criminalise homosexuality, but rather obscene acts, LGBTQ persons still face stigmatization among the broader population.

== Legality of same-sex sexual activity ==
The legality of same-sex sexual activity is ambiguous in Djibouti. Although there is no law that mentions that same-sex sexual activity is legal or illegal, this does not prevent the authorities from prosecuting the public display of same-sex sexual conduct under laws prohibiting attacks on "good morals". Same-sex conduct is therefore treated as de facto illegal.

== Discrimination protections ==
Law No. 119/AN/15/7L establishing a Credit Information System protects sexual orientation as sensitive data. According to the law, “Sensitive data” means "personal data that relate to the private sphere of a natural person and may give rise to discriminatory behaviour towards that person or expose him or her to serious risks. Such sensitive data includes, among others, racial or ethnic origin, political, philosophical or religious opinions or trade union membership, as well as information relating to a person’s sexual orientation or health."

According to the Human Dignity Trust, Djibouti has no legal protections against discrimination based on sexual orientation or gender identity, and same-sex sexual activity remains criminalized under the Penal Code, carrying a potential prison sentence of up to three years. The U.S. State Department also reports that there are no known laws prohibiting discrimination against LGBTQ individuals in any context, and that violence and social stigma are widespread.

== Government opinion ==
In June 2011, the UN Human Rights Council passed a resolution against human rights violations based on sexual orientation and gender identity (IGLHRC 17 June 2011; Human Rights Brief 10 Nov. 2011). Sources indicate that Djibouti voted against the resolution (ibid.; IGLHRC 17 June 2011).

== Living conditions ==
The U.S. Department of State's 2015 Human Rights Report found that "there were no known reports of societal violence or discrimination based on sexual orientation. Societal norms did not allow for the public discussion of homosexuality, and persons did not openly acknowledge having a homosexual orientation."

== Summary table ==
Same-sex sexual activity legal	Yes
Equal age of consent	Yes
Anti-discrimination laws in employment only	No
Anti-discrimination laws in the provision of goods and services	No
Hate crimes law including sexual orientation and gender identity	Yes / No Since 2016
Same-sex marriages	No
Recognition of same-sex couples	No
Step-child adoption by same-sex couples	No
Joint adoption by same-sex couples	No
Gays and lesbians allowed to serve openly in the military	No
Right to change legal gender	No
Access to IVF for lesbians	No
Commercial surrogacy for gay male couples	No (Illegal for all couples regardless of sexual orientation)
MSMs allowed to donate blood	No

== See also ==
- Human rights in Djibouti
- LGBTQ rights in Africa
