= LGBTQ rights in São Tomé and Príncipe =

- São Tomé and Príncipe
- Legal status: Legal since 2012
- Gender identity: No
- Military: No
- Discrimination protections: Yes (sexual orientation only)

Family rights
- Recognition of relationships: No
- Adoption: No

Lesbian, gay, bisexual, transgender, and queer (LGBTQ) people in São Tomé and Príncipe have improved in the 21st century, although LGBTQ people face legal challenges not experienced by non-LGBTQ residents. Both male and female forms of same-sex sexual activity are legal in São Tomé and Príncipe; however, LGBTQ persons face stigmatization among the broader population.

São Tomé and Príncipe was one of the few African states that signed a "joint statement on ending acts of violence and related human rights violations based on sexual orientation and gender identity" at the United Nations, condemning violence and discrimination against LGBTQ people.

== Laws regarding same-sex sexual activity ==
Under the Penal Code of São Tomé and Príncipe that took effect in November 2012, same-sex sexual activity is legal. Since 2021, the age of consent is 18 years regardless of sexual orientation or gender (Law No. 15/2021, relating to the First Amendment to the Penal Code). Previously, the age of consent was 16.

== Recognition of same-sex relationships ==
São Tomé and Príncipe does not recognize same-sex marriages, civil unions, or domestic partnerships.

== Discrimination protections ==
The Labour Code 2019 Article 16.2 bans workplace discrimination based on sex and sexual orientation, among other grounds.

No worker or job candidate can be privileged, benefited, harmed, deprived of any right or exempt from any duty in reason, namely, of ancestry and social origin, race, color, age, sex, sexual orientation, marital status, family situation, genetic heritage, ability to reduced work, disability, chronic illness, nationality, ethnic origin, religion, political beliefs or ideological and union affiliation.

Under Article 130(2)(d) of the Penal Code, crimes motivated by hatred of the victim's sexual orientation are eligible for enhanced sentencing.

== Public opinion ==
A 2016 poll found that 46% of São Toméans would like or not mind having an LGBTQ neighbor.

== Summary table ==
Same-sex sexual activity legal	Yes (Since 2012)
Equal age of consent	Yes (Since 2012)
Anti-discrimination laws in employment only	Yes (Since 2019; sexual orientation only)
Anti-discrimination laws in the provision of goods and services	No
Anti-discrimination laws in all other areas (Incl. indirect discrimination, hate speech)	No
Hate crimes protection including sexual orientation	Yes (Since 2012)
Same-sex marriages	No
Recognition of same-sex couples	No
Step-child adoption by same-sex couples	No
Joint adoption by same-sex couples	No
Gays and lesbians allowed to serve openly in the military	
Right to change legal gender	
Access to IVF for lesbians	No
Commercial surrogacy for gay male couples	No
MSMs allowed to donate blood	No

== See also ==
- Human rights in São Tomé and Príncipe
- LGBTQ rights in Africa
