= Legality of polygamy =

Polygamy around the world

Polygamy is legal only for Muslims Polygamy is legal Polygamy is illegal, but not criminalised in practice Polygamy is illegal and criminalised in practice Legal status unknown: In Nigeria and South Africa, polygamous marriages under customary law and for Muslims are legally recognized.

The legal status of polygamy varies widely around the world. Polygamy is legal in 58 out of nearly 200 sovereign states, the vast majority of them being Muslim-majority countries. Some countries that permit polygamy have restrictions, such as requiring the first wife to give her consent.

In countries that ban polygamy, the offence is commonly called bigamy, though the penalty varies between jurisdictions. In some countries where polygamy is illegal, the prohibition is not enforced.

== Countries that recognize polygamous marriages ==
=== Africa ===
- Algeria
- Cameroon
- Chad
- Central African Republic
- Comoros
- Republic of the Congo
- Djibouti
- Egypt
- Eswatini
- Gabon: Both men and women can join in polygamous marriage with the other gender under Gabonese law. In practice, the right to multiple spouses is reserved for men only.
- The Gambia
- Guinea
- Guinea-Bissau [i]
- Libya
- Kenya: Polygamy legal under legislation passed in 2014.
- Mali
- Mauritania
- Morocco
- Nigeria (only in some states)
- São Tomé and Príncipe
- Senegal
- Somalia
- Somaliland
- South Sudan
- South Africa is recognized for customary marriages. The Supreme Court also ruled that Muslim marriages performed under Sharia law are valid.
- Sudan
- Togo
- Tanzania
- Uganda
- Zambia

=== Asia ===
- Afghanistan
- Bahrain
- Bangladesh
- Bhutan
- Brunei
- Indonesia
- Iran
- Iraq (except for in Iraqi Kurdistan)
- Jordan
- Kuwait
- Maldives
- Oman
- Qatar
- Palestine
- Saudi Arabia
- Syria (except in Syrian Kurdistan)
- United Arab Emirates
- Yemen

=== Oceania ===
- Solomon Islands

== Countries that only recognize polygamous marriages for Muslims ==
Note: These countries are included separately because they have specific legislation aimed only at Muslims.

=== Asia ===
- Malaysia
- Philippines, only for "exceptional cases" even among Muslims where a man could provide for his wives with equal companionship.
- Sri Lanka
- Lebanon
- Pakistan
- Singapore
- India

== Countries that only recognize polygamous marriages under customary law ==
=== Asia ===
India (for Muslims and in Goa)

Africa

- Botswana
- Lesotho
- Liberia
- Malawi
- Namibia
- Niger
- Nigeria (only in some states): Recognized in all northern Sharia states
- Sierra Leone
- Zimbabwe

== Countries that do not recognize polygamous marriages ==
=== Africa ===
Polygamy is more widespread in Africa than in any other continent, being most common in a region known as the "polygamy belt" in West Africa and Central Africa, with the countries estimated to have the highest polygamy prevalence in the world being Burkina Faso, Mali, Gambia, Niger and Nigeria. In the region of sub-Saharan Africa, polygyny is common and deeply rooted in the culture, with 11% of the population of sub-Saharan Africa living in such marriages (25% of the Muslim population and 3% of the Christian population, as of 2019). Polygamous marriages occur, regardless of legality, as the practice is deeply rooted in culture and often supported by Islam in Africa.

- Angola
- Benin
- Burkina Faso
- Burundi
- Cabo Verde
- Democratic Republic of the Congo
- Côte d'Ivoire: Polygamy may be punishable by six months to three years imprisonment, or a fine of CFA 50,000 to CFA 500,000 (US$80 to US$800).
- Eritrea: Illegal since 1977, after 2015 polygamy is punishable with "a definite term of imprisonment of not less than 6 months and not more than 12 months, or a fine of 20,001 – 50,000 Nakfas."
- Equatorial Guinea
- Ghana
- Ethiopia
- Madagascar
- Mauritius
- Mayotte (French territory) (not criminalized): Considered to be de facto illegal since a referendum sponsored by France in March 2009, forcing the island to comply with the French laws. However, pre-existing Muslim marriages are currently still valid.
- Mozambique
- Rwanda
- Seychelles
- Tunisia: Polygamy has been banned and criminalized since 1956 according to Article 18 of the Code of Personal Status and punishable by one year's imprisonment.

=== Americas ===
- Antigua and Barbuda
- Argentina
- Bahamas
- Barbados
- Belize
- Bolivia
- Brazil: Bigamy is illegal. The marriage of a single individual to more than one other person is prohibited by law as bigamy, which is punishable by two to six years of imprisonment, and is valid for every Brazilian citizen, including naturalized ones. De facto polygamy is not outlawed.
- Canada: All forms of polygamy, and some informal multiple sexual relationships, are illegal under section 293 of the Criminal Code. Bigamy is banned by section 290. However, as of January 2009, no person has been successfully prosecuted, i.e. convicted, in over sixty years. In 2009, two acquittals on polygamy charges, arising out of the town of Bountiful, British Columbia, prompted the government of British Columbia to pose a reference question to the Supreme Court of British Columbia (i.e., the superior trial court). The reference questions asked if the criminalisation of polygamy was consistent with the Canadian Charter of Rights and Freedoms; and, if so, under what circumstances could people be legally punished for polygamy. In November 2011 the court released its 335-page long decision, which was that the criminal offence of polygamy is indeed constitutional, but that it should not be used to prosecute minors for having taken part in a polygamous marriage. Chief Justice Robert J. Bauman conceded that there is a conflict between this law and some civil rights principles, but stated that there are other and "more important" issues which in this case take precedence. He wrote (as quoted by CBC News): "I have concluded that this case is essentially about harm. More specifically, Parliament's reasoned apprehension of harm arising out of the practice of polygamy. This includes harm to women, to children, to society and the institution of monogamous marriage." Bauman argued that there are cases where the "wives" (who may be rather young; sometimes as young as 12 years) are abducted and abused, but because they believe in faith-promoting polygamy, they are not willing to bring complaints to the authorities. He reasoned that these offences sometimes may be stopped by applying anti-polygamy legislation. The decision was welcomed by the Attorney General of British Columbia, and by a representative for the group Stop Polygamy in Canada. Likewise, according to CBC News, some polyamorous groups in Canada expressed their relief since Bauman had stated that the law shouldn't apply to them unless they decide to formalize their unions. Women's rights were central to the decision.
- Chile
- Colombia
- Costa Rica
- Cuba
- Dominica
- Dominican Republic
- Ecuador
- El Salvador
- Grenada
- Guatemala
- Guyana
- Haiti
- Honduras
- Jamaica
- Mexico
- Nicaragua
- Panama
- Paraguay
- Peru
- St. Kitts and Nevis
- St. Lucia
- St. Vincent and The Grenadines
- Suriname
- Trinidad and Tobago

Bigamy laws throughout the United States Infraction Misdemeanor Felony All forms of cohabitation outlawed

- United States: While polygamy is generally illegal across the United States, the legal system distinguishes between the practice of having multiple spouses and the specific criminal act of entering into multiple marriage contracts (bigamy). At the federal level, polygamy is considered de jure illegal under the Edmunds Act, which introduced the misdemeanor of "unlawful cohabitation". By criminalizing cohabitation, the federal government removed the burden of proving that a formal marriage had occurred, which had previously hindered prosecutions under the Morrill Anti-Bigamy Act of 1862. Modern enforcement is conducted almost exclusively at the state level. Bigamy is illegal in all 50 states, as well as the District of Columbia, Guam, and Puerto Rico. Utah reduced bigamy from a felony to an infraction in February 2020, which is punishable by a fine up to $750, compensatory service, forfeiture, disqualification, or a combination of those punishments; nevertheless polygamous unions are recognized as illegal under the Constitution of Utah. In other states, bigamy is usually punishable by imprisonment or a fine.
- Uruguay
- Venezuela

=== Asia ===
As in Africa, polygamy continues to be practiced in parts of Asia, regardless of laws.

- Nepal
- China: Polygamy is illegal under the Civil code passed in 2020, which replaced a similar 1950 and 1980 prohibition.
  - Hong Kong: Polygamy ended with the passing of the Marriage Act of 1971. Previous unions entered into under customary law are recognised in some situations.
- Israel: Polygamy has been banned for all confessional communities since at least 1959. Polygamy was criminalized in 1977, but the law is not consistently enforced and polygamy is still practiced by Negev Bedouins.
- Japan
- Kazakhstan: Polygamous marriages are not recognized, but the practice is decriminalized, with Kazakhstan being the only Central Asian country to have decriminalized the practice (in 1998, when the new criminal code no longer provided for such an offense).
- Kyrgyzstan
- Mongolia
- Myanmar
- North Korea
- South Korea
- Taiwan
- Tajikistan
- Turkey (Polygamy was criminalized in 1926 with the adoption of the Turkish Civil Code, part of Atatürk's secularist reforms. Penalties for polygamy are imprisonment of up to 5 years.) Turkey has long been known for its promotion of secularism, and has introduced measures establishing stricter bars against polygamy; these were passed by the ruling moderate Islamist AK Party as well. In March 2009, the AK Party effectively banned polygamists from entering or living in the country.
- Turkmenistan
- Uzbekistan: Religious authorities who perform a marriage ceremony for couples without a civil marriage license face fines of up to 9,900,000 so'm. Additionally, propagandizing or encouraging cohabitation with two or more wives is punishable by a fine of the same amount, or administrative detention for up to 15 days.
- Vietnam
- Cambodia
- Laos
- Russia: Polygamous marriages are not recognized in the Russian Federation. The Family Code of Russia states that a marriage can only be contracted between a man and a woman, neither of whom is married to someone else. Furthermore, Russia does not recognize polygamous marriages that had been contracted in other countries. However, neither bigamy nor de facto polygamy are criminalized.
- Thailand
- Timor-Leste

=== Europe ===
- Albania
- Armenia
- Andorra
- Azerbaijan
- Belarus
- Bosnia and Herzegovina
- European Union: Polygamy is illegal in all 27 states. In Bulgaria, polygamy is illegal and punishable with up to three years imprisonment. In Finland, the official prosecutor is obliged to take all cases to a court where more than two persons are married to each other and such relationships cease to exist after the court has decided it. Polygamic marriages performed abroad may be recognized only on narrow occasions, for instance in child custody matters. In France, polygamy is illegal under Article 433-20 of the Penal Code and punishable by one year's imprisonment and a fine of €45,000. In Germany, polygamy is illegal, legally punishable with fine or prison time up to three years. Polygamous marriages contracted abroad are legal, however, the German authorities announced plans to close this legal loophole by making it a barrier to naturalization. In Ireland, the Catholic Church in Ireland allowed someone with a church annulment but no civil annulment to remarry in church; such a marriage was legally null and bigamous but no prosecutions were brought. The practice ended after the 1996 legalisation of divorce. In 2017, the Supreme Court ruled that if someone had two legal marriages abroad, only the first was legal in Ireland, though 'that did not necessarily mean [the second] marriage "can never have legal consequences [in Ireland]"'. In the Netherlands, a marriage between more than two individuals is prohibited; however, a samenlevingscontract may include more than two partners. It legally accepts immigrants who are in such a union from a country where it is legal; e.g. if a man with two wives immigrates to The Netherlands, all three will be legally recognized. In Romania, bigamy, defined as marriage conducted by a person who is already married, is punishable by up to 2 years in prison or fine. Knowingly marrying a married person is punishable by up to 1 year in prison or by fine. In Sweden, a person who is already married is not permitted to enter into another marriage. In the past, Sweden generally recognized polygamous marriages performed abroad. However, the Swedish government decided to task an inquiry chair with reviewing how to prevent recognition of foreign polygamous marriages in Sweden; Deputy Minister for Justice, Heléne Fritzon stating that "Polygamous marriages should not be recognised in Sweden and we need to review the existing legal loophole that makes it possible. Polygamous marriages undermine gender equality and, according to the UN, it can have serious emotional and financial consequences". Since 2021, Sweden no longer recognizes foreign polygamous marriages, save in exceptional circumstances.
- Georgia
- Iceland
- Kosovo
- Liechtenstein
- Moldova
- Monaco
- Montenegro
- North Macedonia
- Norway
- Russia: Polygamous marriages are not recognized in Russia. The Family Code of Russia states that a marriage can only be contracted between a man and a woman, neither of whom is married to someone else. Furthermore, Russia does not recognize polygamous marriages that had been contracted in other countries. However, neither bigamy nor de facto polygamy are criminalized.
- San Marino
- Serbia
- Switzerland: Polygamy is illegal by law. But polygamous marriage conducted in another country may be accepted or rejected on a case-by-case basis.
- Turkey
- Ukraine
- United Kingdom: Foreign polygamous marriages grant some welfare benefits only, but this is being phased out with the introduction of Universal Credit. Polygamy is treated as bigamy if a second marriage (or civil partnership) is contracted in the United Kingdom. No legal recognition is extended to spouses of subsequent marriages after the first marriage is recognised even when subsequent marriages are contracted abroad.
- Vatican City (Holy See)

=== Oceania ===
- Australia: Polygamous marriages cannot be performed in Australia, but polygamous relationships are still common within some indigenous Australian communities. Polygamous marriages entered into abroad are recognised for limited purposes only.
- Fiji
- Kiribati
- Marshall Islands
- Micronesia
- Nauru
- New Zealand: Polygamous marriages cannot be performed in New Zealand, but are permissible if they are legally performed in a country that permits polygamy.
- Palau
- Papua New Guinea
- Samoa
- Tonga
- Tuvalu
- Vanuatu

== Current legislation ==
In most countries, a person who marries a person while still being lawfully married to another commits bigamy, a criminal offence, though penalties vary between jurisdictions. Besides, the second and subsequent marriages are considered legally null and void.

The United Kingdom, Australia, and New Zealand permit some benefits for spouses of polygamous marriages performed abroad. In the past, Sweden used to recognize polygamous marriages performed abroad; but since 2021, Sweden no longer recognizes such marriages, save in exceptional circumstances. In Switzerland polygamous marriages conducted abroad may be accepted or rejected on a case-by-case basis; see § Europe.

In Canada, both bigamy (article 290 of the Criminal code of Canada)) and de facto polygamy (article 293 of the Criminal Code) are illegal, but there are provisions in the property law of at least the Canadian province of Saskatchewan that consider the possibility of de facto multiple marriage-like situations (e.g. if an already married person enters into a second common-law relationship situation without first obtaining a legal divorce from their existing spouse).

The vast majority of sovereign states with a Muslim-majority population recognize polygamous marriages: these states span from the West Africa to Southeast Asia, with the exceptions of Turkey, Tunisia, Albania, Kosovo and Central Asian countries.

Predominantly Christian nations usually do not allow polygamy, with a handful of exceptions such as the Republic of the Congo, Uganda, and Zambia.

Almost a dozen countries that do not permit polygamous civil marriages recognize polygamous marriages under customary law. All the northern states in Nigeria governed by Islamic Sharia law recognize polygamous marriages. The autonomous regions of Somaliland and Puntland in northern Somalia also recognize polygamy, as does the country's Transitional Federal Government itself, since the country is governed by Sharia law. The recently independent country of Southern Sudan also recognizes polygamy.

Polyandry is de facto the norm in rural areas of Tibet, although it is illegal under Chinese family law. Polygamy continues in Bhutan in various forms as it has since ancient times. It is also found in parts of Nepal, despite its formal illegality in the country.

Debates of legalizing polygamous marriages continue in Central Asian countries.

=== International law ===
In 2000, the United Nations Human Rights Committee reported that polygamy violates the International Covenant on Civil and Political Rights (ICCPR), citing concerns that the lack of "equality of treatment with regard to the right to marry" meant that polygamy, restricted to polygyny in practice, violates the dignity of women and should be outlawed. Specifically, the reports to UN Committees have noted violations of the ICCPR due to these inequalities and reports to the General Assembly of the UN have recommended it be outlawed.

Some countries where polygamy is legal are not signatories of ICCPR, including Saudi Arabia, United Arab Emirates, Qatar, Oman, Malaysia, Brunei and South Sudan; so that ICCPR does not apply to these countries. It has been argued by the Department of Justice of Canada that polygyny is a violation of international human rights law.

== Notable legislation ==
The tables below cover recent pieces of legislation that have been either debated, proposed or voted on; all of which concerns a form of polygamous union.

=== To permit polygamy ===
| Country | Date | Polygamous union | Upper House | | Lower House | | Head of State | Final outcome |
| Country | Date | Polygamous union | Yes | No | Yes | No | Head of State | Final outcome |
|---|---|---|---|---|---|---|---|---|
| Iraq | 1963 | Polygamous civil marriage (revoke of prohibitions) | Passed | | Passed | | Signed | Yes Yes |
| Philippines | February 1977 | Polygamous civil marriage (Muslims only) | - | | - | | Signed | Yes Yes |
| United Kingdom | 1987 or earlier | Foreign marriages may receive benefits payments, being phased out | | | | | | |
| Malawi | 1994 | Customary law (recognizes polygamous unions) | Passed | | Passed | | Signed | Yes Yes |
| Libya | 1998 | Polygamous civil marriage | Passed | | Passed | | Signed | Yes Yes |
| South Africa | 1998 | Customary marriage (civil recognition) | Passed | | Passed | | Signed | Yes Yes |
| Namibia | 2003 | Customary law (recognizes polygamous unions) | Passed | | Passed | | Signed | Yes Yes |
| Namibia | 2004 | Pension benefits to wives of a deceased president | - | | Failed | | - | No No |
| Uganda | 2005 | Polygamous civil marriage (easing of laws; plus restrictions) | Passed | | Passed | | Signed | Yes Yes |
| Kyrgyzstan | 2007 | Polygamous civil marriage | Failed | | - | - | - | No No |
| Kazakhstan | 2007 | Polygamous civil marriage | Failed | | - | - | - | No No |
| Uzbekistan | 2007 | Polygamous civil marriage | Failed | | - | - | - | No No |
| Tajikistan | 2007 | Polygamous civil marriage | Failed | | - | - | - | No No |
| Turkmenistan | 2007 | Polygamous civil marriage | Failed | | - | - | - | No No |
| Kazakhstan | June 2008 | Polygamous civil marriage | Failed | | - | - | - | No No |
| Iran | September 2008 | Polygamous civil marriage (easing of laws) | Failed | | - | - | - | No No |
| Namibia | July 2009 | Polygamous civil marriage | Proposed | | - | - | - | - |
| Russia | 2009 | Polygamous civil marriage | Proposed | | - | - | - | - |
| Kenya | March 2014 | Polygamous civil marriage | Passed | | - | - | - | Yes Yes |

=== To outlaw polygamy ===
| Country | Date | Prohibition type | Upper House | | Lower House | | Head of State | Final outcome |
| Country | Date | Prohibition type | Yes | No | Yes | No | Head of State | Final outcome |
|---|---|---|---|---|---|---|---|---|
| United States | July 1862 | Morrill Anti-Bigamy Act, which made polygamy a misdemeanor offense in US territories and other areas where the federal government has exclusive jurisdiction. | ' | | ' | | Signed | Yes Yes |
| United States | March 1882 | Edmunds Act, which reinforced Morrill by making polygamy a felony in the jurisdictions covered by Morrill; also prohibited "bigamous" or "unlawful cohabitation" as a misdemeanor offense, which removed the need to prove that actual marriages had occurred in order to obtain convictions on polygamy related charges. | Passed | | Passed | | Signed | Yes Yes |
| Turkestan ASSR (modern Kyrgyzstan) | October 1921 | Outlaws polygamy | Passed | | Passed | | Signed | Yes Yes |
| Thailand | October 1935 | Outlaws polygamy; polygamous marriage | Passed | | Passed | | Signed | Yes Yes |
| North Vietnam (modern Vietnam) | October 1950 | Outlaws polygamy | Passed | | Passed | | Signed | Yes Yes |
| Syria | 1953 | Restrictions on polygamous marriage | Passed | | Passed | | Signed | Yes Yes |
| India | 1955 | Outlaws Polygamy (Polygamy for Muslims was outlawed after a verdict by the Supreme Court of India in 2015) | Passed | | Passed | | Signed | Yes Yes |
| Tunisia | 1956 | Ban on polygamy; polygamous marriages | Passed | | Passed | | Signed | Yes Yes |
| Iraq | 1959 | Ban on polygamy; polygamous marriage | Passed | | Passed | | Signed | No Revoked |
| Côte d'Ivoire | 1964 | New penal code outlaws polygamy; polygamous marriages (upholds existing) | Passed | | Passed | | Signed | Yes Yes |
| British Hong Kong (modern Hong Kong) | 1971 | Outlaws polygamy | Passed | | Passed | | Signed | Yes Yes |
| Eritrean People's Liberation Front (modern Eritrea) | 1977 | Outlaws polygamy; polygamous marriage (districts under Sharia exempt) | Passed | | Passed | | Signed | Yes Yes |
| Egypt | 1979 | Restrictions on polygamous marriage; ease of divorce laws | Passed; abrogated | | - | - | - | No No |
| Egypt | 1985 | Restrictions on polygamous marriage (less liberal) | Passed | | Passed | | Signed | Yes Yes |
| France | 1993 | Outlaws family reunion for polygamist immigrants | Passed | | Passed | | Signed | Yes Yes |
| Uganda | December 2003 | Outlaws polygamy | Failed | | - | | - | No No |
| Morocco | 2003 | Restrictions on polygamous marriage | Passed | | Passed | | Signed | Yes Yes |
| Benin | August 2004 | New penal code outlaws polygamy; polygamous marriages (upholds existing) | Passed | | Passed | | Signed | Yes Yes |
| Morocco | February 2005 | Restrictions on polygamous marriage (heavy restrictions) | Passed | | Passed | | Signed | Yes Yes |
| Uganda | July 2005 | Outlaws polygamy | Failed | | - | | - | No No |
| Indonesia | 2007 | Bans civil servants from living polygamously | Passed | | Passed | | Signed | Yes Yes |
| Morocco | May 2008 | Restrictions on polygamous marriage (heavy restrictions) | Passed | | Passed | | Signed | Yes Yes |
| Uganda | June 2008 | Outlaws polygamy | Failed | | - | | - | No No |
| Iraqi Kurdistan | Nov. 2008 | Outlaws polygamy except in selective circumstances | Passed | | Passed | | Signed | Yes Yes |
| Mayotte | March 2009 | 2009 Mahoran status referendum (passage outlaws polygamy) | Territory-wide referendum | | | | | Yes Yes |
| Turkey | May 2009 | Disallows polygamists from immigrating into the country | | | | | | Yes Yes |
| Indonesia | July 2009 | Restrictions on polygamous marriage | Pending | | Pending | | - | - |
| Namibia | July 2009 | Ban on polygamy and polygamous customary marriages | Proposed | | - | - | - | - |

== See also ==
- Polygamy
- List of polygamy court cases
