= Bigamy =

Act of having two concurrent marriages

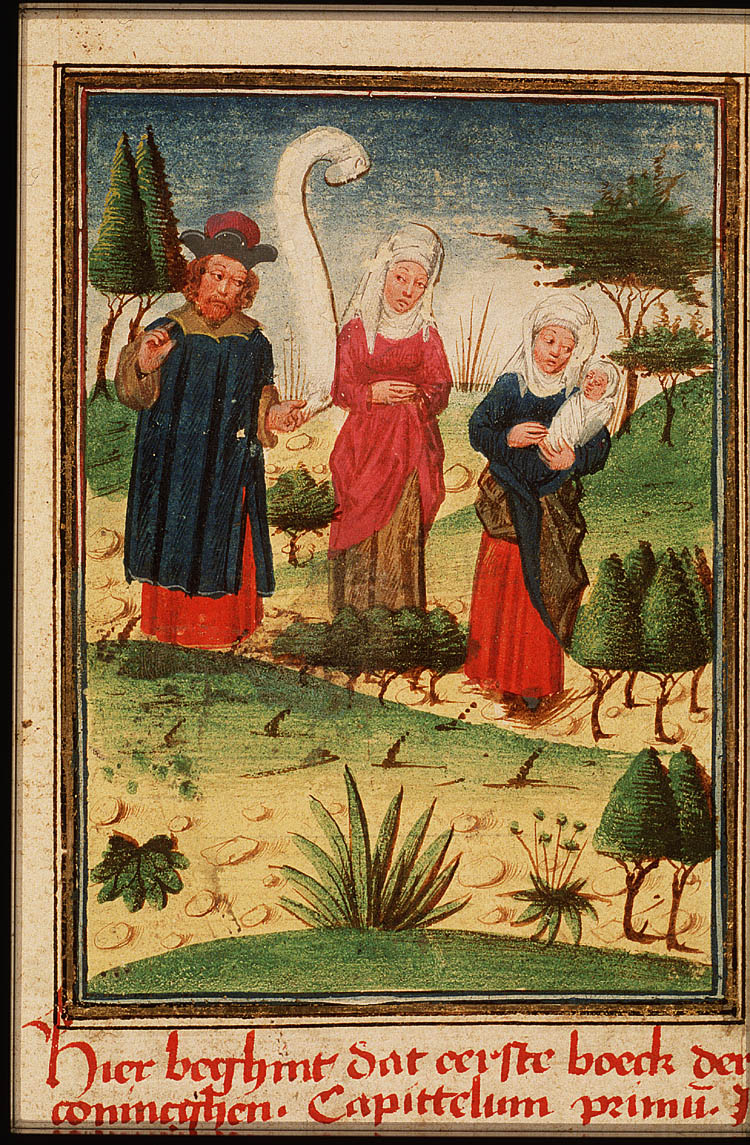
Elkanah and his two wives

In a culture where only monogamous relationships are legally recognized, bigamy is the act of entering into a marriage with one person while still legally married to another. A legal or de facto separation of the couple does not alter their marital status as married persons. In the case of a person in the process of divorcing their spouse, that person is taken to be legally married until such time as the divorce becomes final or absolute under the law of the relevant jurisdiction. Bigamy laws do not apply to couples in a de facto or cohabitation relationship, or that enter such relationships when one is legally married. If the prior marriage is for any reason void, the couple is not married, and hence each party is free to marry another without falling foul of the bigamy laws.

Bigamy is a crime in most countries that recognise only monogamous marriages. When it occurs in this context often neither the first nor second spouse is aware of the other. In countries that have bigamy laws, with a few exceptions (such as Maldives and Sudan), consent from a prior spouse makes no difference to the legality of the second marriage, which is usually considered void.

== History of anti-bigamy laws ==
Even before Christianity became the official religion of the Roman Empire, Diocletian and Maximian passed strict anti-polygamy laws in 285 AD that mandated monogamy as the only form of legal marital relationship, as had traditionally been the case in classical Greece and Rome. In 393, the Roman Emperor Theodosius I issued an imperial edict to extend the ban on polygamy to Jewish communities. In 1000, Rabbi Gershom ben Judah ruled polygamy inadmissible within Ashkenazi Jewish communities living in a Christian environment.

== Legal situation ==
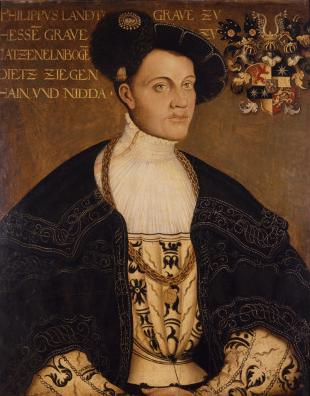
Philip I, Landgrave of Hesse, was exposed as a bigamist in 1540 by his sister, Elisabeth

Most western countries do not recognise polygamous marriages, and consider bigamy a crime. Several countries also prohibit people from living a polygamous lifestyle. This is the case with the United States where the criminalisation of a polygamous lifestyle originated as anti-Mormon laws, although they are rarely enforced. De facto polygamy is illegal under US federal law, the Edmunds Act.

In diplomatic law, consular spouses from polygamous countries are sometimes exempt from a general prohibition on polygamy in host countries. In some such countries, only one spouse of a polygamous diplomat may be accredited, however.

=== By country and region ===
- Australia: Illegal. Up to five years' imprisonment.
- Belgium: Illegal. Five to ten years' imprisonment.
- Brazil: Illegal. Two to six years' imprisonment.
- Canada: Illegal. Up to five years' imprisonment.
- China: Illegal. Up to two years' imprisonment, and up to three years for bigamy with soldiers (but tolerated for some minorities, such as Tibetans, in some rural areas in the south-west).
- Colombia: Illegal with exceptions (such as religion). Although bigamy no longer exists as a lone figure in the Colombian judicial code, marrying someone new without dissolving an earlier marriage may yield to other felonies such as civil status forgery or suppression of information.
- Egypt: Legal for men if first wife consents.
- Eritrea: Illegal. Up to five years' imprisonment.
- Germany: Illegal. Up to three years' imprisonment.
- Ghana: Illegal. Up to six months' imprisonment.
- Hong Kong: Illegal. Up to seven years' imprisonment.
- Iceland: Illegal.
- India: Legal only for Muslim men but very rarely practiced. Up to 10 years' imprisonment for others except in the state of Goa for Hindus due to its own civil code.
- Indonesia: Depending on the specific tribe in question, bigamy can be legal or illegal.
- Republic of Ireland: A criminal offence under section 57 of the Offences Against the Person Act 1861, up to seven years' imprisonment. The Director of Public Prosecutions has discretion and rarely prosecutes. Catholic canon law permits a second marriage if the first was in a UK register office or annulled by the church; the state considered such marriages bigamous without a civil annulment (more restricted than a church annulment) or divorce (illegal from 1937 until 1996) and two cases in the 1960s led to suspended sentences. The 1861 act replaced an 1829 act which in turn replaced acts of 1725 and 1635.
- Iran: Legal for men with consent of first wife.
- Israel: Illegal for members of each confessional community. Up to five years' imprisonment.
- Italy: Illegal. Up to five years' imprisonment.
- Libya: Legal for men with conditions.
- Malaysia: Illegal for non-Muslims under federal jurisdiction. Under section 494 of Chapter XX of the Penal Code, non-Muslim offenders found guilty of bigamy or polygamy can be punished up to seven years' imprisonment. Bigamy or polygamy is legal only for Muslim men with restrictions under state jurisdiction, rarely practised.
- Maldives: Permitted for anyone.
- Malta: Illegal.
- Morocco: Permitted for Muslims, restrictions apply.
- Netherlands: Illegal. Up to six years' imprisonment. If the new partner is aware of the bigamy they can be imprisoned for a maximum of four years.
- New Zealand: Illegal. Up to seven years' imprisonment, or up to two years' imprisonment if the judge is satisfied the second spouse was aware their marriage would be void.
- Pakistan: Polygamy in Pakistan is permitted to men with some restrictions.
- Philippines: Legal for Muslim men. Others face six to 12 years' imprisonment and legal dissolution of marriage.
- Poland: Illegal, up to two years' imprisonment.
- Portugal: Illegal. Up to two years' imprisonment, or up to 240 days of day-fine.
- Romania: Illegal.
- Russia: Illegal (exceptions: Tatarstan, Chechnya, & Dagestan).
- Saudi Arabia: Bigamy or polygamy is legal for men with some restrictions, but has become less common in the late 1900s and early 2000s; see Polygamy in Saudi Arabia
- Somalia: Polygamy is legal for men at marriage courts; long-standing tradition.
- South Africa: Legal for men under the Recognition of Customary Marriages Act, 1998 for customary marriages. Under civil law marriages (regulated by the Marriage Act), any marriage in addition to an already existing one is invalid (but not criminalised).
- Spain: Illegal. Between six months to a year's imprisonment (Art. 217 of the Criminal Code).
- Sudan: Bigamy or polygamy is legal for men.
- Taiwan: Illegal. Up to five years' imprisonment.
- Thailand: Prior to October 1, 1935, polygamy in Thailand could be freely practised and recognised under civil law. Since its abolition, it is still practised and widely accepted in Thailand, though no longer recognised, as the law states "A man or a woman cannot marry each other while one of them has a spouse."
- Tunisia: Illegal. Up to five years' imprisonment.
- Turkey: Illegal. Up to two years' imprisonment.
- United Kingdom: Illegal, although marriages performed abroad may be recognised for some legal purposes (see Polygamy in the United Kingdom).

On indictment, up to seven years' imprisonment or on summary conviction up to six months' imprisonment, or to a fine of a prescribed sum, or to both.

- United States: Illegal in every state. Up to five years' imprisonment. (see Polygamy in North America.)
- Uzbekistan: Illegal. Up to three years of imprisonment and a fine of 50 to 150 monthly wage installments. Women are not punished if they marry a man who has another unknown wife.
