= Polygamy in Algeria =

Polygamous marriages may be legally contracted in Algeria in the form of polygyny, and a man may take up to four wives. However, recent amendments to the Algerian Family Code have made it increasingly more difficult to contract such a marriage and reports of polygamous marriages occurring have been notably rare. Neighboring Tunisia outlaws polygamy altogether.
