= Polygamy in Somalia =

Under law, polygamy is legal in the country of Somalia.

== See also ==
- Legal status of polygamy
- Polygamy in Islam
