= Polygamy in Syria =

Polygamy as polygyny in most of Syria is restricted. After the outbreak of the Syrian Civil War, the Kurdish Rojava inhabited regions outlawed polygamy in the northeastern parts of Syria that fell under their de facto control. In Raqqa, Deir al-Zor, and Manbij, local administrative did not implement the law against polygamy, but in Qamishli, Serekaniye, and Kobani, have.
