= Polygamy in Kazakhstan =

The practice of polygamy has had a long history in Kazakhstan, which officially decriminalized the practice in 1998, being the only Central Asian country to do so. Polygamous marriages are not recognized under the law, but bigamy is not a crime. In practice, polygamy is common in Kazakhstan, and is often seen as a sign of a man's social prestige.

== Polygamous marriage ==
While currently illegal, there have been numerous proposals in the recent years to legislate polygamous marriage in the country; the most recent attempt was in mid-2008. A similar bill was introduced in 2007, though was swiftly outvoted in the parliament. In February 2011, presidential candidate Amatay Asilbek stated that legalizing polygamy was one of his campaign positions.

Many proponents of the legislation of polygamous civil marriage in Kazakhstan have argued that legalizing polygamous marriage would help balance out the uneven population, while others have cited the Qur'an as an argument in favor of such legislation, which permits men to marry up to four wives; according that he treats them equally and can financially look after them.

Opponents argued that the practice was dangerous to society, while other groups viewed the legislation as discrimination against women, since it would not allow for polyandrous marriages, which sparked a social debate over a possible "common ground" resolution.

== Public opinion ==
A poll conducted in 2004 found that some 40% of Kazakh men supported the legislation of polygamy in Kazakhstan, while only 22% of women supported the idea, though with some reservations.
