= Marriage in the United Kingdom =

Legal union in the United Kingdom

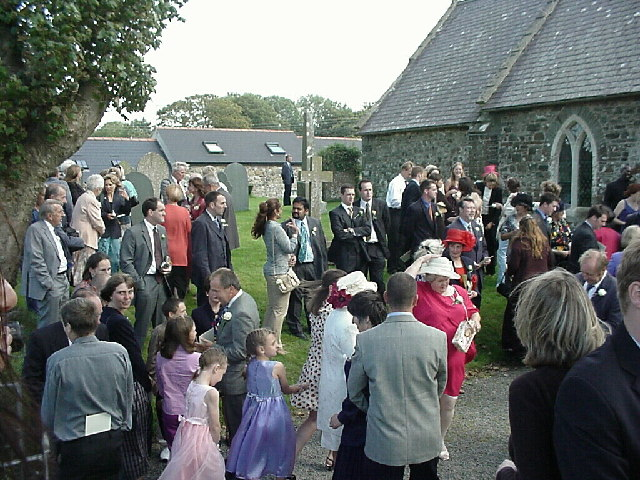
A village wedding at St Nicholas church.

Marriage in the United Kingdom has different laws and procedures in the different countries. For details see:

- Marriage in England and Wales
- Marriage in Northern Ireland
- Marriage in Scotland

== History ==
A survey in the United Kingdom in 2011 showed that people who are married are more likely to be happy than those who are not married.

== See also ==
- Civil partnership in the United Kingdom
- Polygamy in the United Kingdom
- Same-sex marriage in the United Kingdom
