= Polygamy in Cameroon =

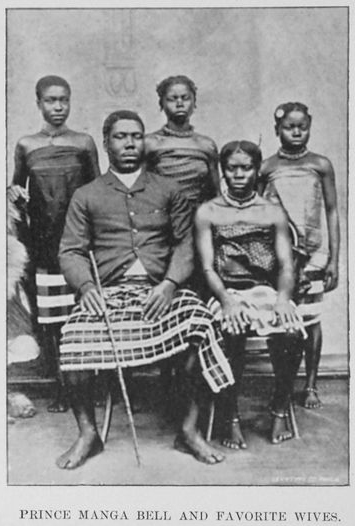
Prince Manga Bell with his wives.

Polygyny is legal in Cameroon, contracted frequently for reasons of both status and wealth. It has been reported that polygamy is most often found in rural areas of the country. It has been said that polygamous unions are slowly beginning to decrease, mainly due to social and economic reasons. There is no limit on how many wives a man can take, which is rare for most nations that allow polygyny.
