= Polygamy in the Central African Republic =

Polygyny

While polygyny is legal in the Central African Republic, it has been reported that the more well-educated women living in the nation have tended to oppose it, favoring a monogamous marriage instead. The country's legal code allows a man to take up to four wives, but he must decide on the nature of his future marriages before he is allowed to contract his first. In other words, if a man plans to marry one to three more women in the future, he must make this clear: otherwise, he will not be allowed to marry additional women if he later changes his mind.
