= Polygamy in Egypt =

Polygamy is legal in Egypt, but not common.

== Legal status ==
Polygamy is legal in Egypt.

In 2019, Ahmed al-Tayeb, the Grand Imam of Al-Azhar, caused controversy by ruling that polygamy is unlawful for Muslims, but he did not call for a legal prohibition of polygamy.

== Prevalence ==
As of 2020, less than 1% of Muslim men in Egypt live with more than one spouse.
