= Polygamy in Rwanda =

Though legally prohibited since 1962, polygamy is still marginally practiced in Rwanda. Polygyny is the only form traditionally practiced. It is most prevalent in rural areas, older generations, and adherents of traditional/animist religion. In 2012, 5.4% of rural men were in polygynous unions; this included 15% of rural men over 80 years old but less than 3% of men under 30, with the average number of wives being two. Animism has the greatest proportion of polygynous men, followed by non-religious men and Islam. However, the vast majority of polygynous men are Christian. Polygyny has been in decline since the first census data in 1978.

== History ==
It is estimated that 30% of marriages in pre-colonial Rwanda were polygynous. The number of wives for polygynous men rarely exceeded 4, and while polygynous Hutu men averaged more wives than their Tutsi and Twa counterparts, this number could be exceeded by high-ranking Tutsi chiefs pursuing more wives to establish larger familial networks. Supplementary wives were culturally preferred to bear more children and to serve as economic assets for managing a rich husband's cattle or land plots. It was also a solution to a man's only wife being sterile.

A polygynous husband's wives lived separately and did not raise each other's children. For husbands who could afford it, each wife resided in separate, economically self-sufficient compounds that they each managed in addition to their domestic duties. When husbands owned a single compound, the wives would live in separate huts. The first wife married by a husband was equal in status to his other wives. Her compound was not considered a primary household, though if she bore his first son, his status as his father's successor would gave her a particular importance.

Polygyny began to decline in the early to mid-twentieth century, partly due to a combined effort by the White Fathers and Belgian colonial administration to stop the practice as part of a broader campaign to Christianize the population. This included deposing King Yuhi V Musinga for his refusal to convert, limiting administrative positions exclusively to Christians, and a 1931 polygamy tax on additional wives. Despite organized resistance from the Nyabingi cult in northern Rwanda, the conversion of King Mutara III Rudahigwa led to a mass adoption of Roman Catholicism. Additional factors included the introduction of a monetary economy and the increasing cost of bride price.

== Legality ==
Polygamous marriages are not lawful in Rwanda, nor is the practice itself. The Rwandan constitution explicitly bans all forms of non-monogamous marriages from being recognized under civil law and does not allow for customary law to recognize such unions either. The text from the constitution reads:

Article 25 [Marriage]
(1) Only monogamous marriages shall be recognized within the conditions and forms prescribed by law.
