= Polygamy in Russia =

Polygamous marriages are not recognized in the Russian Federation. The Family Code of Russia states that a marriage can only be contracted between a man and a woman, neither of whom is married to someone else. Furthermore, Russia does not recognize polygamous marriages that had been contracted in other countries. Under Russian law, de facto polygamy or multiple cohabitation in and of itself is not a crime.

Due to the imbalance between urban educated women and men in predominantly Mongol-inhabited regions of Russia, men sometimes may have multiple women as wives, one report claims. This sometimes results in households that are openly de facto polygamous.

== By subject of Russia ==
=== Republic of Chechnya ===
Ramzan Kadyrov, the head of the Republic of Chechnya, is a polygamist. He has three wives and has spoken out in favor of the practice.

=== Republic of Dagestan ===
Polygamy is a growing trend for Muslims in Dagestan.

=== Republic of Ingushetia ===
In July 1999, Ruslan Aushev, at the time the president of Ingushetia, signed a decree allowing men in the republic to marry up to four wives, in accordance with the Islamic tradition. Russia's justice minister immediately criticized the regional decree as unconstitutional since it directly contradicted provisions of a federal law (the Family Code). Aushev's decree was struck down by the courts a year later, by which time over 15 men in Ingushetia had taken advantage of the right to officially register their marriages to multiple women.
