= Polygamy in Malaysia =

Legal situation

Polygamy is the practice of having more than one spouse at the same time. Specifically, polygyny is the practice of one man taking more than one wife while polyandry is the practice of one woman taking more than one husband. Polygamy is legal in Malaysia in the form of polygyny, that is, between one man and up to four wives. Special permission from an individual state's Syariah Court is required for each marriage after the first by fulfilling the requirements needed by the state's Syariah Law.

For example, in the State of Selangor under Section 23 of the Enactment 2 of Islamic Family Law (State of Selangor) 2003 requires the husband who wanted to practice polygamy in the state to obtain written permission from State Syariah Court and permission will be approved if the applicant is able to take responsibilities towards his first wife and his other wives and would not cause harm to the wives.

However, this is only allowed for Muslims, and for non-Muslims, polygamy is banned under the Law Reform (Marriage and Divorce) Act 1976 as it only recognized monogamous marriage, and any marriage other than that is considered unlawful.
