= Polygamy in Guinea =

Polygamy in Guinea is generally illegal. Polygamy is regulated under the new 2019 family law. The new regulations stipulate that a marriage is presumed to be monogamous; however a couple may legally enter into a polygynous marriage if the groom declares that he is opting for polygyny during the marriage ceremony and the bride gives "explicit consent". The new law is the result of a long legislative battle between those who wanted free polygamy without restrictions and those who wanted a complete ban.

Under the previous law polygamy was banned for civil marriages, but the law was not enforced. Polygamy was widely practiced in religious marriages.

== Prevalence of polygamy ==
The prevalence of polygamy in Guinea is one of the highest in the world, although it is today less common than in the past. UNICEF reported in 2005 that 53.4% of Guinean women aged 15–49 were in polygamous marriages. 29.8% of girls aged between 15 and 19 were in polygamous marriages. In 2020, it was estimated that about 26% of marriages were polygamous (29% Muslim and 10% Christian).

Guinea is part of the "polygamy belt", a part of West and Central Africa that stretches across Africa, from Senegal to Tanzania, in which polygamy is very common and strongly rooted in culture and society.

Guinea is estimated (as of 2020) to have the sixth highest polygamy rate in the world (after Burkina Faso, Mali, Gambia, Niger and Nigeria).
