= Polygamy in Bahrain =

Like many nations in the Muslim world, polygyny is legal in Bahrain. However, according to the Bahrain Center for Human Rights' write-up on women's rights in Bahrain at the present time, polygamy is only practiced by a minority of Bahraini citizens, though unlike most nations, levels of education and areas of habitation do not play a strong role in statistics composed of citizens practicing polygamy. Between 2010 and 2015, the polygamy rate in Bahrain was 5.16 percent.
