= Polygamy in Uganda =

Polygamy is legal in Uganda, where a man is allowed to marry multiple wives at a time. Due to this, most families tend to contain an abundance of children.

== Prevalence ==
In 2014, 8.3% of all women aged 18 years or more, were currently married or cohabiting in a polygamous relationship, and 7.1% of men.

== Dynamics ==
Uganda is one of the few predominantly Christian nations to legally recognize polygamous unions, with others being the Republic of the Congo, Zambia, and Central African Republic. The legal status of the Democratic Republic of the Congo is disputed. There have been numerous attempts to outlaw polygamy in the country, the first of which was in 1987, though none of the active proposals have passed. Polygamy is being challenged in the constitutional court in a petition brought by MIFUMI in January 2010. The case has yet to be heard.

=== History of the Domestic Relations Bill ===
- 1987: The Domestic Relations Bill is officially drafted.
- 2003: An updated version of the Domestic Relations Bill, which would effectively outlaw polygamy, is drafted.
- November 2003: The Cabinet approves the Domestic Relations Bill.
- December 9, 2003: The Domestic Relations Bill goes before the Parliament.
- December 2003: The parliament rejects the Domestic Relations bill.
- 2005: The Domestic Relations Bill is reintroduced.
- March 29, 2005: A large protest against the bill is held.
- July 2005: The Domestic Relations Bill fails to pass.
- 2006: President Yoweri Museveni issues a statement regarding the bill, stating "[the bill] ... was not urgently needed'"
- March 2008: President Museveni calls for the Domestic Relations Bill's "speedy passage"
- June 2008: The Parliament rejects the Domestic Relations Bill once more.

== Protest against bill that would limit polygamy ==
On March 29, 2005, over 1,000 Ugandan Muslims rallied against a proposed bill that would require a husband to seek permission from his first wife before marrying any more women. Uganda is one of the few countries allowing polygamous unions that do not have such restrictions. The bill later died, and similar proposals have yet to be made.
