= Polygamy in Botswana =

The current status of polygamy is difficult to determine in Botswana as, legally, only marriage between a single man and woman is permissible, though there is a notable loophole. A man can marry his first wife (or village wife) under customary law, while then marrying his second under civil law. While the practice was thought to have long disappeared from the region, it has been noted that polygamous unions are still active in Botswana, though not particularly common. Polygamous unions in the nation do not have any more effect in the areas such as divorce battles, sexual abuse and a higher spread of HIV/AIDS than any other relationship style. A lack of proper health care and unprotected sex leads to a higher spread of STDs of all kinds, which is a problem to begin with in the country.
