= Polygamy in Turkmenistan =

Polygamy is prohibited by law in Turkmenistan and legal framework does not provide for polygamous marriages under civil law nor customary law. Despite such illegalities, there have been a handful of debates, with a proposed polygamous marriage bill voted down by the upper house in 2007.
