= Polygamy in Tajikistan =

Sexual practice in Tajikistan

Polygamy in Tajikistan is illegal, and the law does not provide for any form of legally recognized polygamous marriage or union. Similar to the situation in neighboring countries, polygamy is quite prevalent in Tajikistan due to significant gender imbalance in the country. According to reports in 2006, the practice is apparently on the rise. There has also been debate about legalizing polygamous civil marriage in the country.
