= Polygamy in Zimbabwe =

Polygamy is the practice of having more than one spouse; while prohibited under Zimbabwean civil law, polygamous marriages may be performed under the country's customary law. Less than one-fifth of the country's population are engaged in polygamy.

== Legality ==
In Zimbabwean civil law, the Marriage Act of Zimbabwe only recognises monogamous marriages. However, the majority of marriages in Zimbabwe are customary; the relevant African Marriages Act of Zimbabwe recognises both polygamous and "potentially polygamous" unions. Most of these customary marriages are unregistered.

== Incidence ==
Polygamy in Zimbabwe was traditionally practised by the tribal chiefs as a means of elevating their social standing, though they would typically only take two or three wives. According to a 2008 William & Mary Law School study, an estimated 18 percent of Zimbabwean women belong to polygamous marriages. The study suggested that there may be a decrease in the incidence of polygamy in Zimbabwe due to an ever-weakening economy that would not enable men to financially support multiple partners.

Polygamy in Zimbabwe has been criticised by various mainstream Christian groups that 80 percent of the country identify with. A 2008 study by the University of Fort Hare stated that polygamy was more prevalent in rural Zimbabwe and especially among the Shona people; it also argued that "polygamy ... seems to propagate child sexual abuse in schools because it sees no boundary between adults and children."

=== Notable marriages ===
In September 2012, Zimbabwe Prime Minister Morgan Tsvangirai customarily married Elizabeth Macheka, following a court ruling that he could not legally marry her in light of his already being engaged to two other women, Locardia Karimatsenga and Nosipho Regina Shilubane. However, a spokesperson for Tsvangirai said that the prime minister only wished to have one wife.
