= Polygamy in the Comoros =

Polygamous marriages may be legally contracted in the nation of Comoros.
