= Polygamy in the United Kingdom =

Polygamous marriages may not be performed in the United Kingdom, and if a polygamous marriage is performed, the already-married person may be guilty of the crime of bigamy under section 11 of the Matrimonial Causes Act 1973.

In 2012, the BBC reported on Muslims practicing polygamy in the UK.

== England and Wales ==
Bigamy is a statutory offence in England and Wales. It is committed by a person who, being married to another person, goes through a ceremony capable of producing a valid marriage with a third person. The offence is created by section 57 of the Offences against the Person Act 1861:

Whosoever, being married, shall marry any other person during the life of the former husband or wife, whether the second marriage shall have taken place in England or Ireland or elsewhere, shall be guilty of felony, and being convicted thereof shall be liable to be kept in penal servitude for any term not exceeding seven years [...] Provided, that nothing in this section contained shall extend to any second marriage contracted elsewhere than in England and Ireland by any other than a subject of Her Majesty, or to any person marrying a second time whose husband or wife shall have been continually absent from such person for the space of seven years then last past, and shall not have been known by such person to be living within that time, or shall extend to any person who, at the time of such second marriage, shall have been divorced from the bond of the first marriage, or to any person whose former marriage shall have been declared void by the sentence of any court of competent jurisdiction.

— Section 57 of the Offences against the Person Act 1861

This section replaced section 22 of the Offences against the Person Act 1828 for England and Wales, which replaced section 1 of the Bigamy Act 1603 (1 Jas. 1. c. 11). This section replaces section 26 of the Act 10 Geo. 4. c. 34 for Northern Ireland.

Subsequent case law has allowed exceptions for cases where the defendant believes on reasonable grounds that their first spouse is dead or that the marriage has been dissolved.

Bigamy is triable either way. A person guilty of bigamy is liable, on conviction on indictment, to imprisonment for a term not exceeding seven years, or on summary conviction to imprisonment for a term not exceeding six months, or to a fine not exceeding the prescribed sum, or to both.

Relevant cases are:

- R v Crowhurst [1979] Crim. L.R. 399
- R v Smith 1994 15 Cr App R (S) 407
- R v Cairns [1997] 1 Cr App R (S)
- R v Bajlu Islam Khan, Karen Mary Kennedy [2004] EWCA Crim. 3316
- R v Trigger Alan, Mike Seed and Philip Stark [2007] EWCA 254, [2007] 2 Cr. App. R. (s) 69
- R v Arthur William Ballard [2007] 2 Cr. App. R. (S) 94

== Scotland ==
Bigamy was a common law offence in Scotland prior to the passing of the Marriage and Civil Partnership (Scotland) Act 2014 when it became a statutory offence. It is an offence for a person to enter into a marriage or civil partnership while either party knows that they, or the other party, is married to or in a civil partnership with another person. The offence is punishable with up to 2 years in prison or a fine (or both).

== Northern Ireland ==
In Northern Ireland, a person guilty of bigamy is liable, on conviction on indictment, to imprisonment for a term not exceeding seven years, or on summary conviction to imprisonment for a term not exceeding twelve months, or to a fine not exceeding the prescribed sum, or to both.

== See also ==
- Marriage in the United Kingdom
- Polygamy
