= Polygamy in Benin =

The nation of Benin recognizes polygamous marriages neither by civil law nor by customary law. Polygamy was permitted until 2004 when it was formally abolished. After the intake of the current constitution, polygamous marriages were constitutionally banned in the country. However, polygamous marriages contracted prior to the ban are still legally recognized by the government.

The share of polygamous marriages in Benin is at 23.5% of all marriages. Polygamy is more common in rural areas compared to urban areas (27.4% versus 18.8%). This share is the lowest in Littoral Department with 8.9% and the highest in Couffo Department with 40.0%.
