= Polygamy in the Democratic Republic of the Congo =

Polygamous marriages in the Democratic Republic of Congo are officially illegal, the practice continues. It is still practiced as a part of traditional culture.
