= Polygamy in Uzbekistan =

Polygamy is illegal in Uzbekistan, punishable under Article 126 of the country's Criminal Code by fines of up to 41,200,000 Uzbekistani so'm (UZS) or up to three years of restricted freedom. Uzbekistan's legislation further prohibits facilitating or promoting polygamy. In 2023, new regulations were introduced to prevent religious authorities from performing wedding ceremonies for couples without a civil marriage license. These new regulations additionally criminalized promoting or encouraging cohabitation with two or more wives. Both acts are now punishable by a fine of up to 9,900,000 UZS, or up to 15 days of administrative detention in the case of promoting polygamous cohabitation.

Despite its legal prohibition, polygamy has seen an increase in popularity since Uzbekistan's independence from the Soviet Union in 1991. Gender scholar Niginakhon Saida identifies post-independence economic challenges as partially causing a rise in polygamy during the 1990s and early 2000s, as decreasing social welfare programs and employment prospects drove women to seek economic security through marriage, even if their marriage was informal and lacked legal recognition. Rising polygamy rates are also related to increasing societal interest in Islam, as well as cultural norms within Uzbek society. According to Nargis Kosimova, polygamous marriages are not only "perceived quite normally" by many Uzbeks, but may even be romanticized by some young women, who see second wife status as bringing all the material benefits of marriage without its ensuing cultural obligations, such as domestic work and caregiving for her husband's parents, which would fall to his first (and only legally-recognized) wife.

there have been recent debates about the legislation of polygamous marriages under civil law; though such measure have always failed to pass.
