= Polygamy in Mauritius =

Polygamy is not a prevalent practice in the island nation of Mauritius and polygamous unions are not legally recognized. However, the practice is not criminalized.
