= Polygamy in Vietnam =

Polygamy laws in Vietnam

National Assembly of Vietnam
- Status: In force

Polygamy was officially criminalized in Vietnam during the 1950s, and under current law is punishable by imprisonment of up to three years, depending on the severity of the offense.. Polygamy is reportedly no longer practiced in the country, though has had its roots in the past among the Hmong people. Polygamous marriages are prohibited by Article 64 of the Constitution, which stipulates that a lawful marriage must be monogamous.. Article 2 and 5 of the Law on Marriage and Family (2014), passed by the National Assembly, prohibits marriages, cohabitation, or relationships as husband and wife involving individuals who are already married.
