= Polygamy in Gabon =

Under Gabon's penal code, both men and women may have more than one spouse; however, in practice typically only men take multiple spouses. Before contracting a marriage, the couple must state whether they intend to pursue a polygamous relationship in the future. Men may later retract their decision and opt for polygamy if they desire, but women do not have this option.

== See also ==
Polyandry
