= Polygamy in France =

Polygamy is illegal in France and has been at the center of recent political debates, due to surges of Muslim immigrants living polygamously in the country. As a result, stricter laws have been enforced to stamp out polygamy.

In the 1970s and 1980s, large numbers of polygamous immigrants arrived in France, and their marriages that were performed abroad were generally recognized by France. Since 1993, France no longer recognizes second spouses in marriages performed abroad (before that date, visas were granted freely to family members of immigrants).

The Economist estimates that in France, 200,000 people live in 16,000 to 20,000 polygamous families, almost all of them Muslims of North or central African heritage. Several politicians stated that they perceived polygamy as a contributing cause of the 2005 French riots.

== Islam and polygamy in France ==
The issue of polygamy in France is tied to the topics of Islam in France, immigration to France, and the French colonial empire in Muslim majority countries. Polygamy, along with the burqa, forced marriages and female genital mutilation, has been the subject of political controversy in France in the context of debates about immigration.

After a Muslim woman was arrested by French police for wearing a face-covering veil while driving, Interior Minister Brice Hortefeux sought to remove her husband's citizenship due to allegations of polygamy. The husband, Algerian-born Lies Hebbadj, responded "If we are stripped of nationality, for having mistresses... then there would be a lot of French people stripped of nationality. As far as I know, mistresses are not forbidden, neither in France, nor in Islam."

In December 2020, Prime Minister Emmanuel Macron's cabinet introduced a draft bill addressing polygamy as a response to perceived Islamic radicalism. The bill would deny immigrants French residency in France if they were found to be polygamous, and future marriages would be canceled if authorities conclude that they were forced. In February 2021, the French National Assembly passed the bill.

== Mayotte ==
Polygamy was legal in the French island territory of Mayotte until 2009. This changed, however, when 95% of Mayotte citizens voted on March 29, 2009 to become the 101st department of France. As a result, the island was forced to bar all forms of polygamous unions and other forms of practices that "contradict with French culture", including child marriages. The island was consequently required to disallow recognizing polygamy by 2011, when the vote became effective.
