= Polygamy in Eswatini =

Polygamy in Eswatini is legal but rare due to high bride prices. Eswatini has a dual legal system of common law, based on Roman-Dutch law, and traditional unwritten Swazi law. Polygamous marriages are mostly performed under traditional law but also sometimes under civil marriage.
