= Polygamy in Equatorial Guinea =

Polygamy is theoretically illegal in Equatorial Guinea but is still commonly practiced and such unions are recognized by the nation's system of customary law; which provides those under such unions with exactly the same rights found under the country's civil marriages. However, unlike civil marriage, customary marriages do not grant men and women equal rights; with all of the rights falling into the husband's hands.
