= Polygamy in Yemen =

As Yemen is a mostly-Muslim nation, polygamy is lawful. Polygamy is permissible in Islam up to four wives, as long as the husband devotes equal attention to each of them.

In 1999, it was estimated that 7% of married women were in polygamous unions. By 2020, the percentage had fallen to 2%. Polygamy in Yemen is significantly less common than it is in the "polygamy belt", a predominantly Muslim area of Western and Central Africa where the practice is most common. Additionally, women living in rural areas or mountainous settings are more likely to contract a polygamous marriage than women living in the coastal region or urban settings of the country. In the same fashion, it was reported that the majority of women living in polygamous unions tended to be less educated than those living in monogamous marriages.
