= Polygamy in Mozambique =

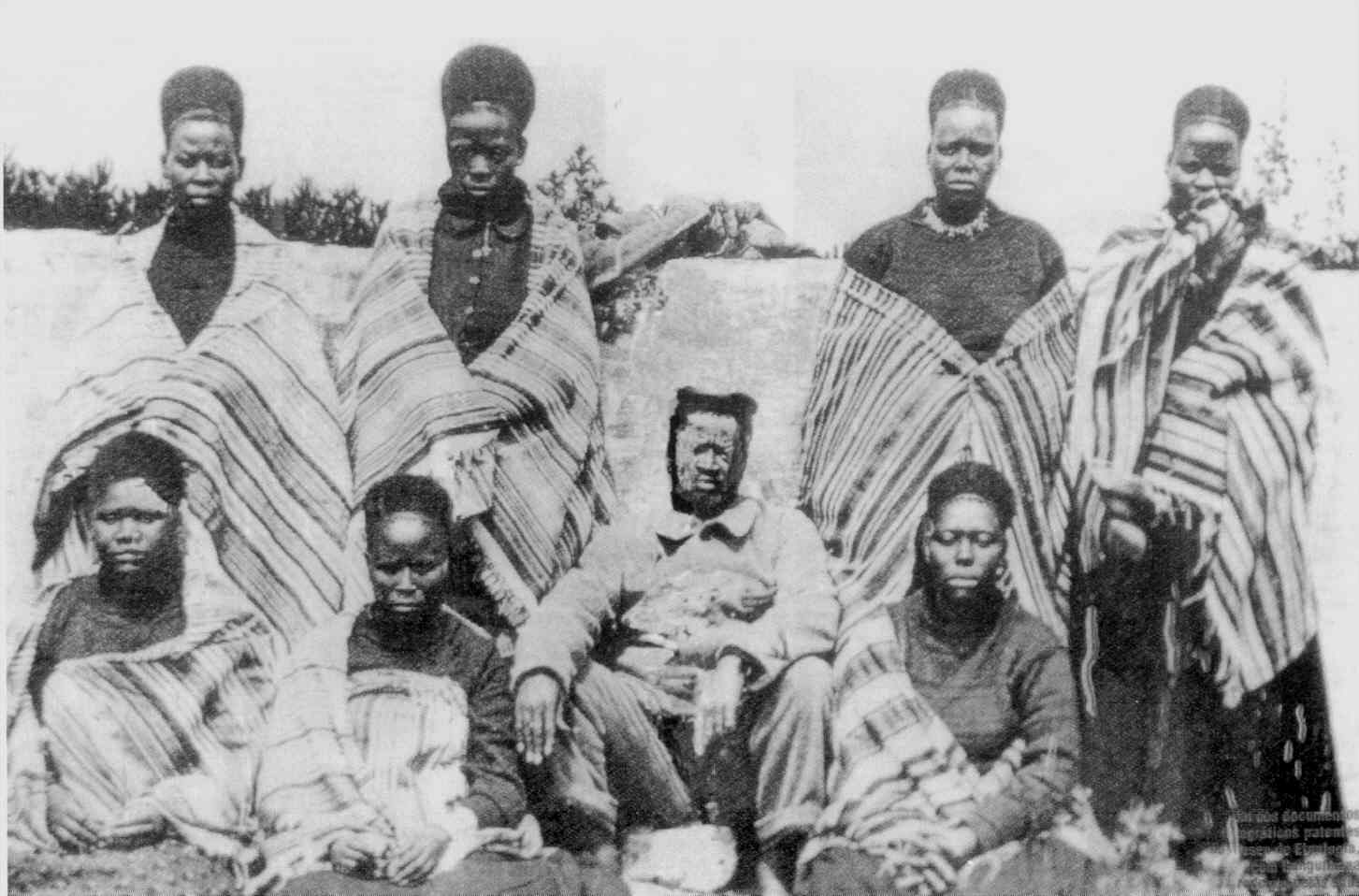
Gungunhana, last emperor of Gaza, Mozambique, made captive by the Portuguese, and his seven wives after their arrival in Lisbon for exile.

Mozambique prohibits legal recognition of polygamous unions, yet there are no legal restrictions against the practice itself, which has been reported to be quite widespread in the coastal country. A man cannot register more than one official wife, but he may have them in practice.

== Prevalence ==
As of 2019, it was estimated that about nearly 20% of married Mozambican women aged 15–49 are in polygynous unions. The central provinces Manica and Tete, as well as the southern province of Gaza, have the highest prevalence of polygamy. According to the Mozambique Demographic and Health Survey, around 60% of currently married women in Gaza province were certain their husband did not have another wife.

According to a 2007 study, there is a positive correlation between the rate of polygyny and the rate of unmarried men in Mozambique.

In southern Mozambique, it is tradition to pay a lobola (bride price) and a man's number of wives is only limited by his financial assets. In northern Mozambique, where a larger percentage of the population is Muslim, religion dictates that a man may have up to four wives.

Co-wives may live in a singular compound, although this might promote tension and fighting. If the husband can afford to do so, it is generally seen as preferable for each family unit (a wife and her children) to live in their own home, perhaps even in different villages.

=== Senior wife status ===
The first wife, called the "senior wife," enjoys more recognition, not only because she is legally recognized, but also due to the long-standing traditions of Mozambique that give her a higher rank than junior wives. Additionally, a higher bride price is paid for the senior wife. A study published in 2019 showed that the senior wife typically experiences more intimate partner violence than her husband's junior wives.

Senior wives are typically the oldest and are married to their husbands monogamously for a period of time. Polygamous husbands may choose to marry an additional wife for a variety of reasons, including infertility, marital issues, help with domestic chores, or the desire for a younger partner.

== Family Law ==
In 2003, a draft Family Law was first introduced by the Danish group DANIDA and deals with giving increased rights to women and children across Mozambique. The law states that both women and men must be 18 to marry, although women can be 16 with the consent of her parents. The draft Family Law was critiqued by RENAMO politician Leopoldo Alfredo Ernesto, who felt it was too radical and did not represent the entirety of rural Mozambique customs.

The non-governmental organization WLSA Mozambique is a feminist group that has been fighting against the formal inclusion of polygamy in Mozambique's Family Law.

== Criticisms of polygamy ==
Southern Africa has a high prevalence of AIDs; critics of polygamy state that it facilitates the spread of HIV further. According to FRELIMO politician Elvira Luis Mabunda, polygamy "treats women like tractors" and does not benefit them.

Polygamy has been shown to correspond to an increase in domestic abuse. Polygamous husbands have been shown to view their wives as "acquisitions," rather than people.

The Christian church in Mozambique is against polygamy. Christian activists have argued that polygamists should not be entirely excluded from church life.

Activist Fátima Mimbire pointed out at the Lusophone African Feminist Forum that polygamous husbands must be able to financially support all of their wives and children equally; this is unlikely in Mozambique's developing economy.

== Justifications of polygamy ==
After the death of many Mozambican men in the Mozambican Civil War, polygamy was a cultural solution to the gender imbalance. Many justifications for polygamy center on the fact that there are insufficient men and these men need children to care for them. Other justifications include that polygamy prevents prostitution and promiscuity, polygamy allows each wife to have time-off, and that it is a long-held cultural belief.

The John Marange sect is a religious group that promotes polygamy, among other beliefs like traditional medicine. Others believe that polygamy is an essential Mozambican cultural tradition, and thus must be preserved.

Polygamy can be seen as a status symbol, since polygamous husbands must have been able to pay multiple bride prices. These husbands, in turn, have a larger pool of children, with contributes to their higher status and productivity of their agricultural farms.

Muslim Mozambicans believe that their religion justifies having up to four wives since it is in a "man's nature" to be polygamous. Daude Ibramogy, representing the Islamic Council of Mozambique, has advocated for the legalization of polygamy to give junior wives legal protection. Sheik Umar Aiuba, in a panel in Quelimane, promoted polygyny, so long as the husband is able to treat his wives fairly.

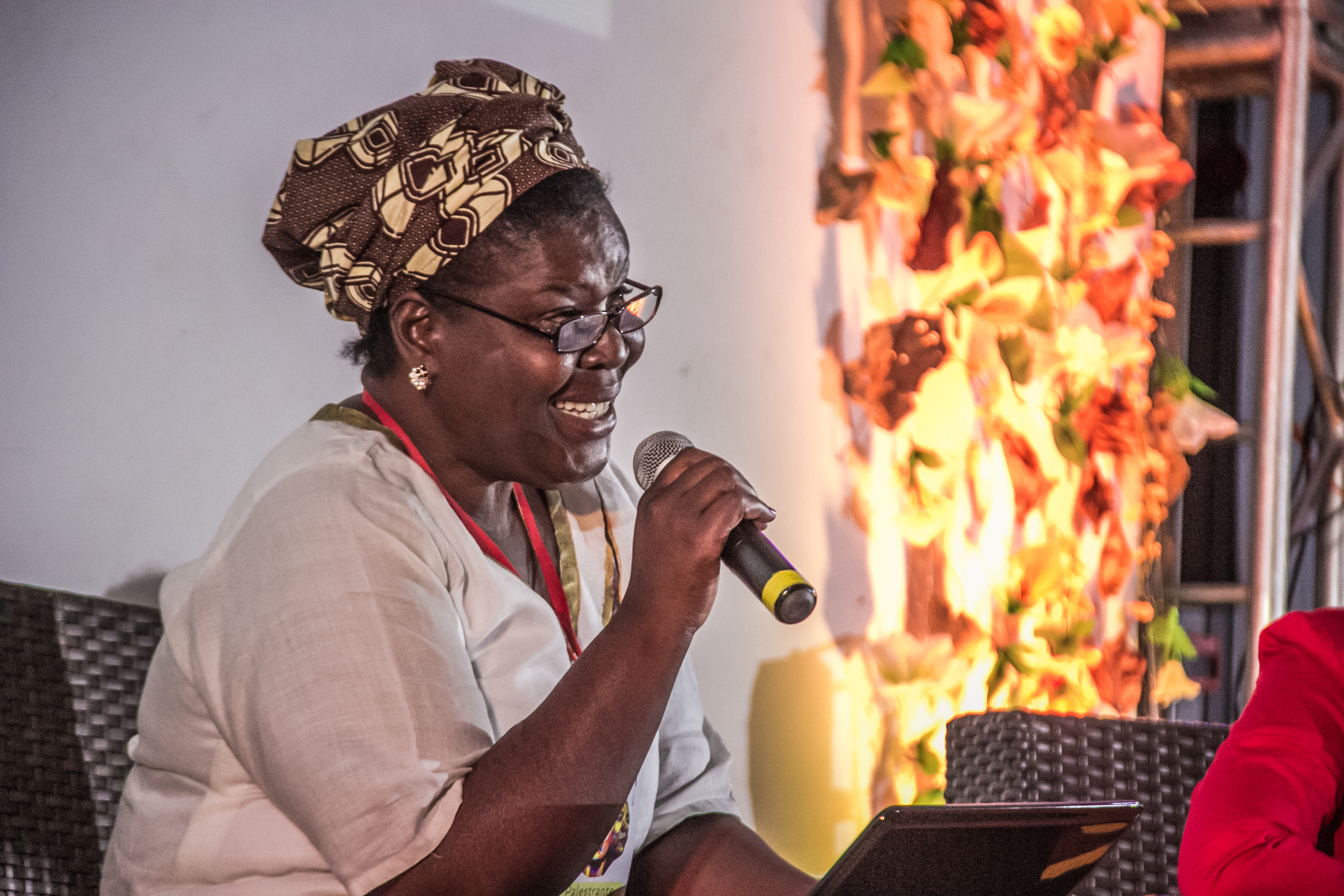
Paulina Chiziane, author of The First Wife: A Tale of Polygamy, speaking at a panel

== In literature ==
Mozambican author Paulina Chiziane has written about the practice of polygamy in her book The First Wife: A Tale of Polygamy. When asked about the longevity of polygamy in Mozambique, Chiziane said "Polygamy will not disappear. It will only change names."
