= Polyandry in Tibet =

Polyandry is a marital arrangement in which a woman has several husbands. In Tibet, those husbands are often brothers; "fraternal polyandry". Concern over which children are fathered by which brother falls on the wife alone. She may or may not say who the father is because she does not wish to create conflict in the family or is unsure who the biological father is. Historically the social system compelled marriage within a social class.

When the People's Republic of China annexed Tibet, political systems in many regions of Tibet remained unchanged until, between 1959 and 1960, political reforms changed the land ownership and taxation systems.

Since 1981, the Tibet Autonomous Region government no longer permits new polyandric marriages under family law. It is currently illegal.

== Rationale behind polyandry ==
As elucidated further below, the primary reason for polyandrous marriage among Tibetans appears to be economic: to prevent land, herds, and other assets from being divided and/or to increase the amount of labor available to support the family.

== Historical social stratification and family structure ==
The Tibetan social organization under Lhasa control from the 17th century on was quasi-feudal, in that arable land was divided and owned by aristocratic families, religious organizations, and the central government and the population was subject to those district divisions. The population was further divided into social classes:

- aristocratic lords (ger-ba)
- monastics (as much as 20% of the population)
- subjects (mi-ser) consisting of:
  - taxpayer families (tre-ba or khral-pa)
  - householders (du-jong or dud-chung-ba)
  - landless peasants (mi-bo)

=== Taxpayer families ===
These wealthier family units hereditarily owned estates leased from their district authority, complete with land titles. In Goldstein's research about the Gyantse district specifically, he found them owning typically from 20 acres (81,000 m^{2}) to 300 acres (1.2 km^{2}) of land each. Their primary civil responsibility was to pay taxes (tre-ba and khral-pa means "taxpayer"), and to supply corvée services that included both human and animal labor to their district authority. According to Goldstein, the entire family structure and marriage system were subordinated to serve the land and corporate family unit.

The family structure and marriage system of tre-ba were characterized by two fundamental principles:

- the corporate stem family; and
- the mono-marital principle.

A "stem family" is one in which a married child is inextricably linked to his natal family in a common household. The "mono-marital principle" dictates that for each and every generation, one and only one marriage is permitted collectively among all the male siblings, and the children born out of this marriage are members of the family unit who have full legal rights.

The family organization was based on these two patterns to avoid the partitioning of their estates. A generation with two or more conjugal families was seen as unstable because it could produce serious conflicts that could divide their corporate family land. As a matter of fact, Tibetan inheritance rules of family land, mainly based on agnatic links, did provide for each generation to partition the land between brothers, but this was ignored to prevent the estate unit from being threatened. Polyandrous marriage, therefore arose as a solution to this potential threat.

To elucidate, consider a family with two or more sons. Tibetan inheritance rules gave all males of the family, the right to claim a part of the family estate, so if each son took a different bride, there would be different conjugal families, and this would lead to the partitioning of the land among the different sons' families. To avoid this situation, the solution was a fraternal polyandrous marriage, where the brothers would share a bride. Bi-fraternal polyandrous marriages were more common than tri-fraternal or quadri-fraternal polyandry, because the latter forms of marriage were often characterized by severe familial tensions (reference missing). Different mechanisms were employed to reduce the number of sons within a household, such as making one son a celibate monk, or sending away a son to become an adoptive bridegroom to a family without male children.

Another kind of marriage, although uncommon, is the "polygynous marriage". In a family where all the children were female, sisterly polygynous marriage represented the most common choice. In traditional inheritance rules, only males had rights over the land, but where there were no males to inherit them, the daughters had the right over the corporation’s land. To maintain the familial estate unit, the daughters would share a bridegroom who will move matrilocally (as opposed to the patrilocal principle where the brides move into the husband's family) and become a member of his wife's family.

Bigenerational polygamy was present as an application of the mono-marital principle. Consider a family in which the mother died before the son was married. If the widower remarried another woman, two conjugal families would have been created, leading to the eventual partition of the estate. Bigenerational polyandry, whereby the father shared a wife with his son, was therefore the solution to avoid this problem. Conversely, when a woman with no male offspring was widowed, she would share a husband with her daughter ("bigenerational polygyny"), thus avoiding land partitioning (reference missing).

In these mono-marital stem families, the family head, who had a dominant role in the family, was called trong bey abo (or simply abo). The abo who managed the property and resources of the family unit, was always a male, and almost invariably the oldest male of the elder generation in power. Sometimes, a younger brother would assume the abo role when the eldest male retired.

In taxpayer families, polyandrous and monogamist marriage were the more common forms of marriage, while much less widespread was the polygynous marriage. Bigenerational forms of polyandry were, however, very rare.

=== Householders ===
The householder class (du-jung or dud-chung-ba) comprised peasants who held only small plots of land that were legally and literally "individual" possessions. Land inheritance rules were different from taxpayer families, determined by the district authority and not strictly hereditary to the family unit.

The householder family structure — unlike the taxpayer families — lacked the single marriage per generation requirement to avoid land parceling. When a son married he often established a new household and split off from the original family unit. If taxpayer sons married that created succession for the family corporation and bound them to the estate for patrimonial and land reasons. Householder marriages did not incur that responsibility, and they generally married for love and were more often monogamist. The small number of polyandry cases within the householder class were limited to only the wealthier families.

=== Landless peasants ===
The landless peasants (mi-bo) were not obligated to and did not have any heritable rights to land. Like the householders, they tended to have less polyandry than the taxpayer families.

== Fraternal polyandry ==
As has been seen, fraternal polyandry was a form of marriage that was prevalent among the tre-ba class. Traditionally, marriages were arranged by the parents, often when the children were still very young. As tre-ba marriages were decided for patrimonial reasons, the brides' and bridegrooms' personal preferences were of no consequence. In polyandrous conjugal family, the eldest brother was, more often than not, the dominant person in the household. All the other brothers, however, shared the work equally, and had the right to sexual relations with their common wife, who had to treat them equally.

All children were treated equally, and a "father" was not allowed to show any favoritism, even if he knew who his biological children really were, as biological paternity was not regarded as important. Similarly, the children considered all their uncles as their fathers, and a child avoided treating members of the elder generation differently, even if they knew who their biological father was. The children would usually only address the eldest surviving husband as "father".

Divorce was quite simple. If one of the brothers in a polyandrous marriage felt displeased, he only had to leave the household. Polyandrous marriages were often characterized by tensions and clashes for a variety of different reasons. For example, conflicts might arise because a younger brother wanted to contest the authority of his eldest brother; sometimes, sexual favoritism might occur, generating tension among the male partners in the marriage, especially so when there were significant age differences among the brothers.

== Current status ==
Polyandry declined rapidly in the first decade after the establishment of Tibet Autonomous Region, and was banned during the Cultural Revolution as part of the "Four Olds". However, it regained popularity in the 1980s as the policies relaxed and the people's commune system broke down. A 1988 survey by the Tibet University throughout Tibet found that 13.3% of families were polyandric, and 1.7% were polygynous. Currently, polyandry is present in all Tibetan areas, but particularly common in some rural regions of Tsang and Kham that are faced with extreme living conditions. A 2008 study of several villages in Xigaze and Qamdo prefectures found that 20-50% of the families were polyandric, with the majority having two husbands. For some remote settlements, the number was as high as 90%. Polyandry is very rare among urban residents or non-agricultural households. Representatives of an American charity working in Ganzi Tibetan Autonomous Prefecture, Sichuan Province, from 1997 to 2010 observed polyandry still being practiced there.

A regulation issued by government of Tibet Autonomous Region in 1981 approved all polygamous marriages before the date of implementation, but not those formed after the date, with no prosecution for violating the regulation. In practice, such a family would be registered as a monogamous family between the wife and the eldest husband.

== See also ==
- Tibetan culture

== Footnotes ==
=== General references ===
- Goldstein, Melvyn C. 1971. "Stratification, Polyandry, and Family Structure in Central Tibet", Southwestern Journal of Anthropology, 27(1): 64-74.
- Goldstein, Melvyn C. 1987. "When Brothers Share a Wife",Natural History, 96(3):109-112.
- Childs, Geoff. 2003. "Polyandry and population growth in a Historical Tibetan Society", History of the Family, 8:423–444.
- Gielen, U. P. 1998. "Gender roles in traditional Tibetan cultures". In L. L. Adler (Ed.), International handbook on gender roles (pp. 413–437). Westport, CT: Greenwood.
- Crook, John H. & Crook, Stamati. 1994. "Explaining Tibetan polyandry: Socio-cultural, Demographic, and Biological Perspectives". In: Crook, John H. & Osmaston, Henry A. (Editors), Himayalan Buddhist Villages: Environment, Resources, Society and Religious Life in Zangskar, Ladakh (pp. 735–786). Bristol, UK: University of Bristol, Bristol Classical Press. 866 pages. ISBN 0-86292-386-7.
- Goldstein, Melvyn C. 1976. "Fraternal Polyandry and Fertility", Human Ecology, 4(2): 223–233.
- Levine, Nancy E. 1988. The Dynamics of Polyandry: Kinship, Domesticity and Population on the Tibetan Border. Chicago: University of Chicago Press. 309 pages. ISBN 0-226-47569-7.
- Levine, Nancy E., & Silk, Joan. 1997. "Why Polyandry Fails: Sources of Instability in Polyandrous Marriages", Current Anthropology, 38(3): 375–398. (June 1997)
