= Polygamy in Iraqi Kurdistan =

Due to the successful passage of a law in November 2008, the lawful practice of polygamy in the autonomous region of Iraqi Kurdistan is almost impossible. When Kurdistan was divided (from 1994 to 2005), polygamy was abolished under areas controlled by the Patriotic Union of Kurdistan while it remained legal under regions controlled by the Kurdistan Democratic Party. The severe restrictions on polygamy provoked a fierce outcry within the Islamic community, many of whose members feel polygamy to be their right as Muslims as it is ordained by the Qur'an. Feminist groups, on the other hand, viewed the legislation as a semi-victory; as they will not stop until they have fully abolished polygamy in the region.
