= Polygamy in Saudi Arabia =

Legally recognized for men in Saudi Arabia

Polygamous marriages are legally recognized for men in Saudi Arabia, in accordance with Islamic Sharia law, which allows for Muslim men to marry up to four wives, provided that he treats them equally and shares all his wealth equally. However, attitudes towards polygamy in Saudi Arabia have changed in recent decades and became very rare to practice it in the present times.

As a result of COVID-19 lockdown measures, divorce rates in Saudi Arabia rose by 30% in 2020 after Saudi wives increasingly discovered their husbands' secret marriages to other women.

== See also ==
- Polygyny in Islam
