= Polygamy in Mali =

Polygamy in Mali is legal and frequently practiced.

== Prevalence ==
Mali is part of the "polygamy belt", a region in West and Central Africa where polygamy is widely practiced. In a 2019 study, Mali had the second highest prevalence of polygamy in the world, behind only Burkina Faso, with 34% of Malians living in polygamous families (35% of Muslims, 30% of folk religion followers, and 14% of Christians).

== See also ==
- Women in Mali
