= Polygamy in Indonesia =

Polygamy is legal in Indonesia, the largest Muslim population in the world. Polygamy in Indonesia is not just practiced by Muslims, but also customarily done by non-Muslim minorities, such as the Balinese and the Papuans.

A Muslim man may take up to four wives. As allowed by Islam, a man may take more than one wife as long as he treats them equally and can financially support them all. Despite such religious legality, polygamy has faced some of the most intense opposition in Indonesia of any Muslim majority nation. Recent restrictions have brought about harsher penalties for unlawfully contracted polygamous unions and polygamy is said to be on the decline. Indonesian military personnel are only permitted to practice polygamy if their religion allows it. Additionally, he must prove to the government that his first wife is unable to carry out her duties as a wife.

Polygamy under Balinese Hinduism is sanctioned and unrestricted, but the marriage is regulated by adat (traditional customs). Although polygamous marriages are practiced in Bali, the nature of Hindu polygamy has not been included in the national marriage law debates. The native inhabitants of West Papua and Papua have been practicing polygamy long before the arrival of Christian missionaries. The Papuans who choose to still practice polygamous marriages after being Christians usually conduct the adat marriages instead of the church one.

== Criticisms of polygamy ==
Although men are allowed to have up to four wives, Muslim women are forbidden to have more than one husband. Men are encouraged for several reasons to participate in polygamy, including infertility, attraction to other women, etc. It is common for women to support their husbands in polygamy to avoid divorce. Despite these reasons for men to partake in polygamy, it is common for issues to arise. A problem that can arise between families consists of quarrels between wives, which includes insulting and physical fighting. Literature by researchers like Alean Al-Krenawi and John R. Graham indicates that polygamy has had a negative effect on women psychologically and socially. For women, there are negative outcomes when it comes polygamy, including jealousy, unhappiness, loneliness, and mental health issues. To cope with these feelings, it is common for Muslim women to use their faith, distract themselves with other activities, accept their situation, or compromise with their co-wives.

== Restrictions on civil servants ==
Indonesian civil servants are restricted from performing polygamy.

== Call for complete ban on polygamy ==
In late April 2008, a rally of Indonesian women led a protest against the nation's laws allowing for polygamy and polygamous marriages; urging the government to enact a complete ban over such marriages. Male Indonesian politicians were found to be largely opposed, and such a ban has yet to take place.
