= Polygamy in Malawi =

Polygamous relationships in Malawi

While polygamous marriages are not legally recognized under Malawi's civil marriage laws, customary law affords a generous amount of benefits to polygamous unions, ranging from inheritance rights to child custody. It has been estimated that nearly one in five women in Malawi live in polygamous relationships.

== Efforts to outlaw polygamy ==
In the 2000s, there were efforts to abolish the practice and legal recognition of polygamy; these were led mainly by anti-AIDS organizations and feminist groups. Islamic religious leaders opposed an effort in 2008 to outlaw polygamy.

== See also ==
- Polygyny in Islam
