= Polygamy in Kyrgyzstan =

Both the practice and legal recognition of polygamy is illegal in Kyrgyzstan, though the issue has been a hot political topic for several decades. There have been numerous attempts to introduce civil polygamous marriage bills, the most recent being in 2007.
