= Polygamy in Zambia =

Akin to Uganda, Republic of the Congo and the Central African Republic, Zambia is one of the few Christian nations that allows polygamous unions to be legally formed. Under Zambian law, polygamous unions may be contracted and they have been reported to be extremely widespread in the nation. Similar to most countries that provide polygamy as a form of marriage, the first wife must consent to the practice of polygamy before she marries her husband. If she declines, her husband will not be allowed to marry another woman while married to his current wife. According to a 2003 survey, 16% of marriages in Zambia are polygamous. While frequently more common in rural areas, the practice can also be found in more urban settings.

Zambian Law recognizes two kinds of marriage; Statutory marriages under the Marriage Act and customary marriage under different customs that may vary from tribe to tribe. Polygamy is not allowed for those married under the Marriage Act. It is a criminal offense (bigamy) for a person married under the Act to undergo a marriage ceremony whilst legally married to another person. Customary law marriages are potentially polygamous. Whether a man needs consent of his existing wife or wives before taking another wife or wives depends on the particular customs governing the marriage.
