= Polygamy in Lesotho =

The practice of polygamy is legal in Lesotho, though such marriages are not recognized under civil law. However, customary law allows for such unions, which while not recognized as legal marriages by the government, allow the spouses a variety of benefits such as child custody and inheritance rights.
