= Polygamy in Sudan =

According to the Sudanese Law of Personal Status of 1991, Polygamy is legal in Sudan. Sudanese President Omar Hassan al-Bashir has strongly advocated polygamous marriages, with the hopes of boosting the Sudanese population.
