= Polygamy in Angola =

Although polygamy is officially illegal in Angola, the practice is known to be widely socially acceptable and very prevalent among the Angolan population. Many women live polygamously due to the shortage of men since the civil war. Angola does not recognize polygamous marriages under civil law or customary law.
