= Polygamy in Kenya =

The practice of what is usually called polygamy, enjoys de facto and de jure legality in Kenya. It is to be understood as polygyny, however.

== History of Marriage Bill 2007 ==
Marriage Bill 2007 was originally proposed in 1981, though was condemned by politicians for granting women "too many rights", such as the right to specify at the time of the marriage whether or not her husband may choose to take future wives. Most countries allowing polygamous marriages allow such a requirement. Subsequently, the bill was voted down. Revised in 2007, Marriage Bill 2007 faced similar concerns, and thus was not voted on. The bill was reintroduced in March 2009 as planned, addressing legislators' concerns by eliminating a wife's right to stipulate monogamy or polygamy during contraction of the marriage. The bill is currently pending before the parliament and has faced both approval and condemnation from Christian and Muslim religious leaders in the country.

== 2014 polygamy legalisation ==
In March 2014, Kenya's Parliament passed a bill allowing men to marry multiple wives. Polygamy is common among traditional communities in Kenya, as well as among the country's Muslim community.

In parliament, the proposed 2014 polygamy bill had initially given a wife the right to veto the husband's choice, but male members of parliament conspired across party divisions to push through a text that dropped this clause. The passing of the bill caused female members of parliament to storm out of the late night vote on the polygamy legislation in protest.

The Bill was made legislation on 1 May 2014. The Kenyan President described the act as one "which consolidates various laws relating to marriage – provides procedures for separation and divorce. It also regulates the custody and maintenance of children in the event of separation and divorce".

The act also defines marriage as "the voluntary union of a man and a woman whether in a monogamous or polygamous union registered under the Act".
