= Polygamy in Eritrea =

Since the introduction of the current Marriage Law introduced by the EPLF in 1977, polygamy has been illegal in Eritrea. The 2015 Penal Code of the State of Eritrea states that participating in a second marriage will annul the first. If the first marriage is not annulled, one is guilty of bigamy, which is punishable with "a definite term of imprisonment of not less than 6 months and not more than 12 months, or a fine of 20,001 – 50,000 Nakfas." Prior to the law, forms of polygamy were mostly found among Muslims and pagans.
