= Polygamy in Chad =

Polygamy in Chad is legal and it is commonly practiced. Chad is part of the "polygamy belt", a region in Africa which includes countries in West and Central Africa where polygamy is common and deeply rooted in the culture.

Chad is estimated as having the tenth highest polygamy prevalence in the world, with 15% of the population living in polygamous marriages as of 2019 (behind only Burkina Faso, Mali, Gambia, Niger, Nigeria, Guinea, Guinea-Bissau, Senegal and Togo).

Polygamy in Chad has a unique pattern, different from polygamy in other parts of Africa, with Chad being the only country where Christians (21%) are more likely than Muslims (10%) to live in polygamous marriages, according to a 2019 study (the study found that 25% of Muslims in sub-Saharan Africa live in polygamous marriages, compared to 3% of Christians). Religion in Chad is diverse, with Islam being practiced by 55.3% of the population and Christianity by 40.7%; in addition to Islam and Christianity, traditional African religions are also practiced in Chad.

Polygamy in Chad is practiced across social classes, with both the rural population and the wealthy elites often living in polygamous marriages. Both former president Idriss Déby and his son, current president Mahamat Déby, were married polygamously.
