= Polygamy in Burundi =

Marriage practice illegal in Burundi

Polygamy is illegal in Burundi and the nation does not recognize polygamous marriages under civil law or customary law. A 1993 amendment to the Code of Person and Family officially abolished polygamy in the country. Nonetheless, the practice is still present in Burundi and has reportedly increased rather than decreased, mainly due to recent conflicts and crises.
