= Polygamy in Ivory Coast =

Polygamy was abolished in 1964 by the new Civil Code and polygamous marriages entered into after that date would not be valid in Ivory Coast. However, all polygamous marriages entered into prior to that date are still legally recognized in the nation. The practice of polygamy may be punishable by a fine of CFA 50,000 to CFA 500,000 (US$80 to US$800) or six months to three years imprisonment.

== Prevalence ==
23% of men were in a polygynous marriage in 1988. The average polygynist man had 2.3 wives, with higher rates of polygyny found in rural areas than in Abidjan. From 1955 to 1988, rates of polygyny in Ivory Coast remained fairly consistent, occurring with four out of 10 married women. There was some decline found in rural areas from the early 1960s to mid-1970s.
