= Polygamy in the Republic of the Congo =

Polygamy is legally recognized in the Republic of the Congo. The government stated that "regarding polygamy, 'women were free to choose. Before a marriage is contracted, a woman must state beforehand whether she would be comfortable with her husband taking multiple wives in the future. If she decides she does not feel comfortable with such, her husband is unable to marry any other women while married to his current wife".
