= Polygamy in Myanmar =

Outlawed in 2015

Polygamy in Myanmar, also known as Burma, was outlawed in 2015. Prior to that date, polygamy was practiced among some people.
