= Polygamy in Djibouti =

Like every other nation in the Horn of Africa excluding the mostly Christian Ethiopia, polygamy is legal under Djibouti law and has been found in Djiboutian culture for centuries. However, like most countries, such as Libya, legally and traditionally, a man may have up to only four wives at a time.
