= Polygamy in Tunisia =

Tunisia became the first Arab state to formally abolish polygamy in 1956, the same year it gained official independence.

Tunisia remains one of the few predominantly Muslim nations that has legally banned polygamy. Turkey banned the practice in 1926, while the Kurdistan Regional Government in Iraq banned polygamy in 2008.

== See also ==
- Polygyny in Islam
