= Polygamy in Morocco =

Polygamy in Morocco is legal, but very uncommon due to restrictions that were introduced by the government in 2004 that mandated financial qualifications a husband must meet in order to marry a second wife. A husband must have written permission from his current wife before marrying a second wife. Breaking these rules and marrying without permission from one's current wife can result in fines.
