= Polygamy in Libya =

Polygamous unions are legal in Libya. Previously, under the rule of Muammar Gaddafi, a man needed to prove that he was capable of providing for the wives with reasons and require the consent of the first wife. There was an attempt to change the law in February 2013; however, the Constitutional Court overturned the previous law.

According to pre-2011 censuses, the percentage of polygamists in Libya fell from 3.56% in 1995 to 2.57% in 2006.
