= Polygamy in Thailand =

Polygamy in Thailand could be freely practiced before 1 October 1935. Polygamy was recognised under civil law. The old family law assigned wives to three categories in accordance with how they became wives:

- The first was called mia klang muang (เมียกลางเมือง), the 'official wife', whom the husband's parents had "acquired for him".
- The second was known as mia klang nok (เมียกลางนอก), the 'minor wife', whom the man asked after his first marriage.
- The third was mia klang thasi (เมียกลางทาสี), the title given to slave wives who were asked from the mother and father of their prior owners.

Children of these unions were recognised as legitimate.

While polygamy has since been abolished, it is still alive in Thailand and, according to some, widely accepted. The king of Thailand may, for example, still designate "consorts" other than the queen. Such unions are not recognised under Thai law, which states, "A man or a woman cannot marry each other while one of them has a spouse."

== See also ==
- Thai marriage
- Sineenat Wongvajirapakdi
