= Family Code of Russia =

Prime source of family law in Russia

Parliament of Russia
- Citation: 223-ФЗ
- Territorial extent: Russia
- Enacted by: Parliament of Russia
- Signed by: President of Russia
- Signed: 29 December 1995
- Commenced: 1 March 1996
- Status: Amended

The Family Code of Russia (Russian: Семейный кодекс Российской Федерации, abbreviated as СК РФ) is the prime source of family law in the Russian Federation. It was passed by the State Duma on 8 December 1995, signed into law by President Boris Yeltsin on 29 December 1995, and came into force on 1 March 1996. It has been amended a number of times since then, most recently in June 2008.

== Structure of the Family Code ==
- Section I: General provisions
- Section II: Marriage and divorce
- Section III: The rights and duties of spouses
- Section IV: The rights and duties of parents and children
- Section V: Alimony duties of family members
- Section VI: Ways of raising children who are not under parental care
- Section VII: Application of family law to family relationships that include foreign citizens and stateless persons
- Section VIII: Concluding remarks
