= Polygyny =

Mating system in which the male partner may have multiple partners

Polygyny is legal Polygyny is legal for Muslims only Polygyny is illegal, but the practice is not criminalized Polygyny is illegal and the practice is criminalized Legal status unknown: In Eritrea, India, the Philippines, Malaysia, Singapore, and Sri Lanka polygyny is legal only for Muslims.; In Nigeria and South Africa, polygynous marriages based on customary law are legally recognized for Muslims.; In Mauritius, polygynous unions have no legal recognition. However, Muslim men may marry up to four women, but they do not have the legal status of wives.

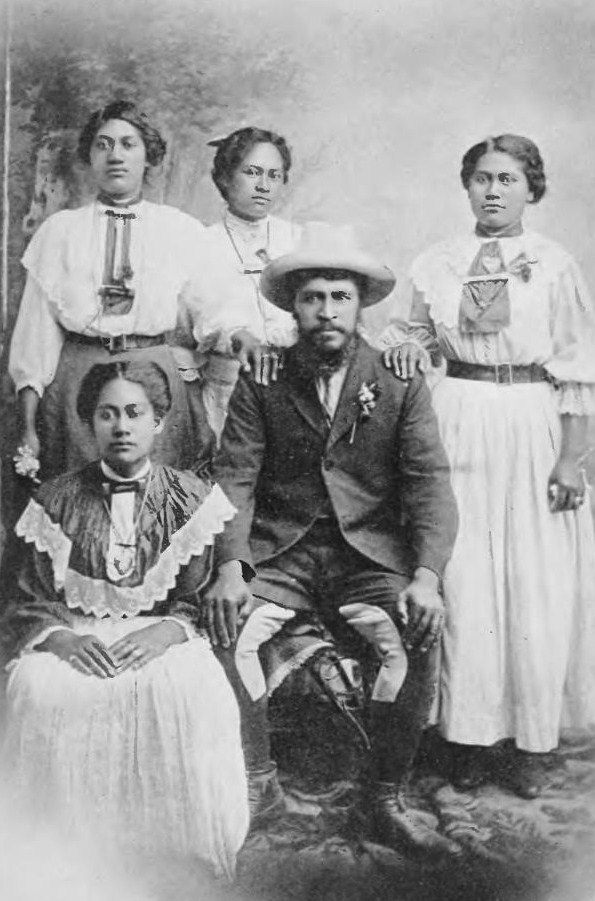
Rua Kenana and four of his wives

Polygyny (/pəˈlɪdʒɪni/) is a form of polygamy entailing the marriage of a man to at least two or more women at the same time. The term polygyny is from Ancient Greek πολύ (polú) 'many' and γυνή (gunḗ) 'woman, wife'.

== Incidence ==
Polygyny is more widespread in Africa than in any other continent. Some scholars theorize that the slave trade's impact on the male-to-female sex ratio was a key factor in the emergence and fortification of polygynous practices in regions of Africa.

Polygyny is most common in a region known as the "polygamy belt" in West Africa and Central Africa, with the countries estimated to have the highest polygamy prevalence in the world being Burkina Faso, Mali, Gambia, Niger and Nigeria. In the region of sub-Saharan Africa, polygyny is common and deeply rooted in the culture, with 11 percent of the population of sub-Saharan Africa living in such marriages (25 percent of the Muslim population and 3 percent of the Christian population, as of 2019). Polygyny is especially widespread in West Africa, with the countries estimated to have the highest polygyny prevalence in the world as of 2019 being Burkina Faso (36%), Mali (34%) and Gambia (30%). Outside of Africa, the highest prevalence is in Afghanistan, Yemen and Iraq.

Polygyny was accepted in ancient Hebrew society, in classical China, and in some traditional Native American, African and Polynesian cultures. In the Indian subcontinent, it was known to have been practiced during ancient times. It was accepted in Ancient Greece, until the adoption of Roman marriage practices and Christianization.

In North America, polygyny is practiced by some Mormon sects, such as the Fundamentalist Church of Jesus Christ of Latter-Day Saints (FLDS Church).

Polygyny is more common in societies that have the custom of bride price.

Some studies of mitochondrial DNA have shown that there have been more mothers than fathers in the genetic record of the human species, meaning that the proportion of females that have reproduced in each generation has generally been greater than the proportion of men that reproduced. The authors of one 2014 study attributed these findings to widespread polygyny.

== Cause and explanation ==
=== Augmenting division of labor ===
Ester Boserup was the first to propose that the high incidence of polygyny in sub-Saharan Africa is rooted in the sexual division of labor in hoe-farming and the large economic contribution of women.

In some regions of shifting cultivation where polygyny is most frequently recorded, labor is often starkly divided between genders. In many of these cases, the task of felling trees in preparation of new plots, the fencing of fields against wild animals, and sometimes the planting of crops, is usually done by men and older boys (along with hunting, fishing and the raising of livestock). Wives, on the other hand, are responsible for other aspects of cultivating, food processing and providing meals and for performing domestic duties for the family. Boserup argues that though women's work comprises a larger percentage of tasks that form the basis of sub-Saharan life, women often do not receive the majority portion of the benefits that accompany economic and agricultural success.

An elderly cultivator, with several wives and likely several young male children, benefits from having a much larger workforce within his household. By the combined efforts of his young sons and young wives, he may gradually expand his cultivation and become more prosperous. A man with a single wife has less help in cultivation and is likely to have little or no help for felling trees. According to Boserup's historical data, women living in such a structure also welcome one or more co-wives to share with them the burden of daily labor. However, the second wife will usually do the most tiresome work, almost as if she were a servant to the first wife, and will be inferior to the first wife in status. A 1930s study of the Mende in the West African state of Sierra Leone concluded that a plurality of wives is an agricultural asset, since a large number of women makes it unnecessary to employ wage laborers. Polygyny is considered an economic advantage in many rural areas. In some cases, the economic role of the additional wife enables the husband to enjoy more leisure.

Anthropologist Jack Goody's comparative study of marriage around the world, using the Ethnographic Atlas, demonstrated a historical correlation between the practice of extensive shifting cultivation and polygyny in many Sub-Saharan African societies. Drawing on the work of Ester Boserup, Goody notes that in some of the sparsely populated regions where shifting cultivation takes place in Africa, much of the work is done by women. This favored polygynous marriages, in which men sought to monopolize the production of women "who are valued both as workers and as child bearers."

Goody, however, observes that the correlation is imperfect, and also describes more traditionally male-dominated though relatively extensive farming systems, such as those common in much of West Africa, particularly the savanna region, where more agricultural work is done by men, and polygamy is desired more for the production of male offspring whose labor in farming is valued.

Goody's observation regarding African male farming systems is discussed and supported by anthropologists Douglas R. White and Michael L. Burton in their article, "Causes of Polygyny: Ecology, Economy, Kinship, and Warfare", where the authors note: "Goody (1973) argues against the female contributions hypothesis. He notes Dorjahn's (1959) comparison of East and West Africa, showing higher female agricultural contributions in East Africa and higher polygyny rates in West Africa, especially in the West African savanna, where one finds especially high male agricultural contributions. Goody says, "The reasons behind polygyny are sexual and reproductive rather than economic and productive" (1973:189), arguing that men marry polygynously to maximize their fertility and to obtain large households containing many young dependent males."

An analysis by James Fenske (2012) found that child mortality and ecologically related economic shocks had a stronger association with rates of polygamy in Sub-Saharan Africa rather than female agricultural contributions (which are typically relatively small in the West African savanna and Sahel, where polygyny rates are higher), finding that polygyny rates decrease significantly in line with child mortality rates.

=== Desire for progeny ===
Most research into the determinants of polygyny has focused on macro-level factors. Widespread polygyny is linked to the kinship groups that share descent from a common ancestor. Polygyny also served as "a dynamic principle of family survival, growth, security, continuity, and prestige", especially as a socially approved mechanism that increases the number of adult workers immediately and the eventual workforce of resident children. In Germany the degree of population loss in the Thirty Years War of 1618 to 1648 led to some regional church authorities temporarily permitting polygyny.

Some scientific studies regard the human mating-system as moderately polygynandrous (multiple males and multiple females, all mating with each other), based both on surveys of world populations, and on characteristics of human reproductive physiology.

=== Economic burden ===
Scholars have argued that in farming systems where men do most of the agriculture work, a second wife can be an economic burden rather than an asset. In order to feed an additional wife, the husband must either work harder himself or he must hire laborers to do part of the work. In such regions, polygyny is either non-existent or is a luxury which only a small minority of rich farmers can indulge.

A report by the secretariat of the UN Economic Commission for Africa (ECA) quotes: "one of the strongest appeals of polygyny to men in Africa is precisely its economic aspect, for a man with several wives commands more land, can produce more food for his household and can achieve a high status due to the wealth which he can command". In Boserup's 1970 discussion of earlier analyses of polygynous systems, for example that of Little's work of the 1930s, that through the hard work, economic, and agricultural assistance of a man's several wives, a husband could afford to pay the bride price of a new wife and further his access to more land, meanwhile increasing his progeny. According to Boserup, writing in 1970, tribal rules of land tenure were still in force over much of the continent of Africa. In this system, members of a tribe which commands a certain territory had a native right to take land under cultivation for food production, and in many cases, also for the cultivation of cash crops. Under this tenure system, an additional wife is an economic asset that helps the family to expand its production.

The economist Michèle Tertilt concludes that countries that practice polygyny are less economically stable than those that practice monogamy. Polygynous countries usually have a higher fertility rate, fewer savings reserves, and a lower GDP. A 2014 study estimates that fertility would decrease by 40 percent, savings would increase by 70 percent and GDP would increase by 170 percent if polygyny were banned. Monogamous societies present a surge in economic productivity because monogamous men are able to save and invest their resources due to having fewer children. Polygynous societies have a higher concentration of men investing into methods of mating with women, whereas monogamous men invest more into their families and other related institutions.

Despite the expenses of polygynous marriages, a 1995 study suggests that men benefit from marrying multiple wives through the economic and social insurance that kinship ties produce. With a large network of in-laws, these men have the ties they need to compensate for other economic shortages.

=== Libido ===
Some analysts have posited that a high libido may be a factor in polygyny, although others have downplayed its significance. The sex drive as a factor in some Asian cultures was sometimes associated with wealthy men and those that were adjunct to an aristocracy, although such libidinal perceptions were at times discarded in favor of seeing polygyny as a factor of traditional life. For example, many sub-Saharan African societies view polygyny as essential to expand their progeny and kinship, a practice of high cultural importance. In this case, it would be hard to determine whether the origin was that of high libido, as polygyny would be practiced regardless. Other explanations postulate that polygyny is a tool used to ward off inclinations towards infidelity. In a chapter comparing Sub-Saharan African polygyny, Boserup (1970) comments that in regions where polygyny is practiced, but for demographic and economic reasons must to be delayed for males until older ages, higher incidences of adultery and prostitution are expected to be present.

=== Enslavement of women ===
Researchers have suggested that Vikings may have originally started sailing and raiding due to a need to seek out women from foreign lands. The concept was expressed in the 11th century by historian Dudo of Saint-Quentin in his semi-imaginary History of The Normans. Rich and powerful Viking men tended to have many wives and concubines, and these polygynous relationships might have led to a shortage of eligible women for the average Viking male. Due to this, the average Viking man could have been forced to perform riskier actions to gain wealth and power to be able to find suitable women. Viking men would often buy or capture women and make them into their wives or concubines. The Annals of Ulster states that in 821 the Vikings plundered an Irish village and "carried off a great number of women into captivity".

Polygyny in West Africa, the region of the world where the practice is most common, exists in a societal context where historical factors, such as the slave trade, interact creating a culture where polygyny is widespread. The slave trade's impact on the male-to-female sex ratio has been cited as a key factor in the high prevalence of polygynous practices in this region of Africa.

== Findings ==
Of the 1,231 societies listed in the 1980 Ethnographic Atlas, 186 were found to be monogamous; 453 had occasional polygyny; 588 had more frequent polygyny; and 4 had polyandry. Apostolou 2007, however, surveyed some 190 hunter gather societies; 87% of those societies had a polygyny rate under 20%. Some research has shown that males living in polygynous marriages may live 12 percent longer. Polygyny may be practiced where there is a lower male:female ratio; this may result from male infants having increased mortality from infectious diseases. However, the natural sex ratio at birth is actually slightly biased in favour of males (the natural sex ratio is around 105 boys/100 girls at birth; generally in the range of 103–107); presently in some countries this is even more biased in favor of males due to sex-selective abortion and female infanticide.

=== Violence ===
Research shows that polygyny is widely practiced in countries that are destabilized, more violent, more likely to invade neighbors and more likely to suffer catastrophic political and economic collapse. This has been attributed to the inequality factor of polygyny resulting in some men being unable to marry. In the top twenty countries in the 2017 Fragile States Index, polygyny is widely practiced. In West Africa, more than one-third of women are married to a man who has more than one wife, and a study of 240,000 children in 29 African countries has also shown that, after controlling for other factors, children in polygynous families were more likely to die young. A 2019 study of 800 rural African ethnic groups published in the Journal of Conflict Resolution found that "young men who belong to polygynous groups feel that they are treated more unequally and are readier to use violence in comparison to those belonging to monogamous groups."

In a 2011 doctoral thesis, anthropologist Kyle R. Gibson reviewed three studies documenting 1,208 suicide attacks from 1981 to 2007 and found that countries with higher polygyny rates correlated with greater production of suicide terrorists. In addition to noting that countries where polygyny is widely practiced tend to have higher homicide rates and rates of rape, political scientists Valerie M. Hudson and Bradley Thayer have argued that because Islam is the only major religious tradition where polygyny is still largely condoned, the higher degrees of marital inequality in Islamic countries than most of the world causes them to have larger populations susceptible to suicide terrorism, and that promises of harems of virgins for martyrdom serves as a mechanism to mitigate in-group conflict within Islamic countries between alpha and non-alpha males by bringing esteem to the latter's families and redirecting their violence towards out-groups.

Along with his research on the Tamil Tigers, anthropologist Scott Atran found that Palestinian terrorist groups (such as Hamas) provide monthly stipends, lump-sum payments, and massive prestige to the families of suicide terrorists. Citing Atran and other anthropological research showing that 99 percent of Palestinian suicide terrorists are male, that 86 percent are unmarried, and that 81 percent have at least six siblings (larger than the average Palestinian family size), cognitive scientist Steven Pinker argues in The Better Angels of Our Nature (2011) that because the families of men in the West Bank and Gaza often cannot afford bride prices and that many potential brides end up in polygynous marriages, the financial compensation of an act of suicide terrorism can buy enough brides for a man's brothers to have children to make the self-sacrifice pay off in terms of kin selection and biological fitness (with Pinker also citing a famous quotation attributed to evolutionary biologist J. B. S. Haldane when Haldane quipped that he would not sacrifice his life for his brother but would for "two brothers or eight cousins").

=== Effects on women ===
Inequality between husbands and wives is common in countries where polygyny is more frequently practiced because of limited education. In Africa polygyny was believed to be part of the way to build an empire. It was not until the post-colonialism era in Africa that polygyny began to be viewed as unjust or taboo. In Egypt, feminists have fought for polygamy to be abolished, but it is viewed as a core component of Islamic family law, and has thus been largely unsuccessful. In countries where polygyny is practiced less frequently, women have more equality in the marriage and are better able to communicate their opinions about family planning.

Women participating in polygynous marriages share common marital problems with women in a monogamous marriage; however, there are issues uniquely related to polygyny which affects their overall life satisfaction and have severe implications for women's health. Women practicing polygyny are susceptible to sexually transmitted infections, infertility, and mental health complications. Among the Logoli of Kenya, the fear of AIDS or becoming infected with the HIV virus has informed women's decisions about entering polygynous marriages. Some view polygyny as a means to prevent men from taking random sexual partners and potentially introducing STIs into relationships. Interviews conducted with some of the Logoli tribe in Kenya suggested they feared polygynous marriages because of what they have witnessed in the lives of other women who are currently in such relationships. The observed experiences of some of the women in polygynous unions tend to be characterized by frequent jealousy, conflicts, competition, tensions, and psychological stresses. Some of the husbands fail to share love and other resources equally; and envy and hatred, and sometimes violent physical confrontations become the order of the day among co-wives and their children. This discourages women from entering a polygynous marriage. Research shows that competition and conflict can intensify to unbearable level for co-wives causing women to commit suicide due to psychological distress. Findings show that the wife order can affect life satisfaction. According to Bove and Valeggia, women who are senior wives often misuse their position to obtain healthcare benefits in countries where only one wife can become a recipient. The conflict between co-wives can attribute to the higher rates of mental health disorders and issues such as anxiety, depression, somatization, psychoticism, and paranoia. As well as this reduced marital/life satisfaction and low self-esteem has been shown to be more prevalent among women in polygynous relationships when compared to women in monogamous relationships.

Various methods have been used to reduce the amount of jealousy and conflict among wives. These include sororal polygyny, in which the co-wives are sisters; and hut polygyny, in which each wife has her own residence and the husband visits them in rotation. A clear status hierarchy among wives is also sometimes used to avoid fighting by establishing unequivocally each wife's rights and obligations. Although there are several harmful aspects of this practice related to women, there are some reported personal and economic advantages for women such as sharing household and child rearing responsibilities. Also, wives share companionship and support with co-wives.

Studies of the Ngwa group in eastern Nigeria shows that on average, women in polygynous unions are 22–26 percent less fertile than women in monogamous unions. Data shows that the greater the intensity of polygyny, the lower the fertility of successive wives: 15 percent deficit for first wives; a 37 percent deficit for second wives; and a 46 percent deficit for third or more wives. Studies show that seems to exist because of the widening age gap between the successive order of wives and because of the decreasing exposure to coitus, if all coitus occurs in marriage.

=== Disease ===
Studies show there are two mechanisms that could lead to higher prevalence rates of HIV in men and women who are in polygynous unions: partners in polygynous unions have more extra-marital relationships and thus increase each other's exposure to HIV; women who are recruited into a polygynous union are more likely to be HIV positive than those who marry a monogamous husband. In addition to these two mechanisms, variation in HIV prevalence rates by union type is possibly due to individuals in polygynous unions are typically part of a sexual network with concurrent partnerships.

The ecological association between polygyny and HIV prevalence is shown to be negative at the sub-national level. HIV prevalence tends to be lower in countries where the practice of polygyny is common, and within countries it is lower in areas with higher levels of polygyny. Proposed explanations for the protective effect of polygyny include the distinctive structure of sexual networks produced by polygyny, the disproportionate recruitment of HIV positive women into marriages with a polygynous husband, and the lower coital frequency in conjugal dyads of polygynous marriages.

For example, studies in Malawi have shown that for men and women in polygynous marriages, the rate of HIV is between 10 and 15 percent. About 14 percent of Malawi's population is infected with HIV, which causes AIDS, according to official figures. There are approximately 78,000 AIDS-related deaths and 100,000 new infections every year in the country.

=== Criticism ===
Criticism of polygyny focuses on the wellbeing of the wives in such marriages, including coercion, buying and selling of wives (such as through bride price, which is common in societies that practice polygyny), concerns about inequality and the fate of the young men left without wives (such as the lost boys in the FLDS Church), as well as the relation between polygyny practiced on a large scale in a society and war.

A notable critic of polygyny was Thomas Aquinas nearly eight centuries ago. He contended that polygyny is unjust to wives and children. He also argues that it creates rival stepchildren and forces them to compete for attention, food, and shelter. According to Aquinas, polygyny violates the requirements of fidelity between husband and wife.

Polygyny has been criticized by feminists such as Professor John O. Ifediora, who believes that women should be equal to men and not subject to them in marriage. Professor Ifediora also believes that polygyny is a "hindrance to social and economic development" in the continent of Africa due to women's lack of financial control. Standard polygynist practices often leave women at a disadvantage if they make the decision to remove themselves from the polygynist lifestyle. To leave the marriage, women must repay their bride price. Though this is simple in thought, this is not simple in execution. To prevent their wives from leaving, husbands will often keep the bride price at high levels, which is often at an unpayable level for women. In most cases, women do not have access to their children if they decide to leave polygyny, nor are they allowed to take them, due to cultural ideas of ownership in relation to progeny. Marci Hamilton sees polygyny as a form of oppression of women; she wrote: "In polygamy, also not a victimless crime, the practice is built on the subjugation of women to the men's needs and demands. Moreover, for many of the religious polygamists, the women are nothing but the means to a particular doctrinal end – creating more children to increase the man's odds of getting into heaven. Again, the men control the finances and the women are commodities, carrying out the sexual goals of the men. There can be no gender equality in this scenario, which is incapable of being squared with any viable theory of women's rights." First wives in polygynous marriages are often in a difficult situation, when the law or religious code does not require their consent or input for new wives to be admitted in the marriage, so the first wife is forced to accept any new women brought into the family by the husband and to get along with them. Polygyny is criticized because of its asymmetrical, unequal marital arrangement, where the husband has sexual/romantic relations with several women, but the wives can only have such a relation with one man, their husband, which often leads to rigid gender roles in the marriage.

A criticism against polygyny is that in almost all cultures and religious communities that practice it, polygyny is the only form of polygamy that is allowed; and, as such, this violates modern principles of equality between men and women, especially as in many such places females having multiple partners is violently punished through honor killings and stoning, or discouraged through female genital mutilation. In the United States, there has been controversy surrounding the Fundamentalist Church of Jesus Christ of Latter-Day Saints that practices polygyny, after the community has been marred by accusations of child sexual abuse, welfare fraud, and child labor trafficking, that culminated in the life imprisonment of polygynous leader Warren Jeffs.

== Premodern era ==
In Africa, the Americas, and Southeast Asia in the Premodern Era, circa 600 BCE – 1600 CE, both monogamy and polygyny occurred. Polygyny occurred even in areas of where monogamy was prevalent. Wealth played a key role in the development of family life during these times. Wealth meant the more powerful men had a principal wife and several secondary wives, known as resource polygyny. Local rulers of villages usually had the most wives as a sign of power and status. Conquerors of villages would often marry the daughters of the former leaders as a symbol of conquest. The practice of resource polygyny continued with the spread and expansion of Islam in Africa and Southeast Asia. Children born into these households were considered free. Children born to free or slave concubines were free, but had lesser status than those born to wives. Living arrangements varied between areas. In Africa, each wife usually had her own house, as well as property and animals. In many other parts of the world, wives lived together in seclusion, under one household. A harem (also known as a "forbidden area") was a special part of the house for the wives.

== By country ==
=== Africa ===
==== Kenya ====
Polygynous marriage was preferred among the Logoli and other Abalulya sub ethnic groups. Taking additional wives was regarded as one of the fundamental indicators of a successfully established man. Large families enhanced the prestige of Logoli men. Logoli men with large families were also capable of obtaining justice, as they would be feared by people, who would not dare to use force to take their livestock or other goods from them. Interviews with some of the contemporary Logoli men and women who recently made polygynous marriages yielded data which suggest that marrying another wife is usually approached with considerable thought and deliberation by the man. It may or may not involve or require the consent of the other wives and prospective wife's parents. A type of "surrogate pregnancy" arrangement was reported to have been observed, in which some wives who are unable to bear children, find fulfillment in the children and family provided by a husband taking additional wives. Some of the men indicated that they were pressured by their parents to marry another wife, who could contribute additional income to the family. Some of the young polygynous men indicated that they were trapped in polygyny because of the large number of single women who needed and were willing to take them as husbands although they were already married. Most of those second and third wives were older women who had not yet married.

==== Nigeria ====
Customary law, one of the three legal systems in operation in Nigeria (the other two being Nigerian common law and Sharia law) allows for one man to legally marry more than one woman.

Unlike those marriages recognized by Sharia, there is no limit to the number of legal wives allowed under customary law. Currently polygyny is most common within royal and noble families within the country, and is largely practiced by the tribes native to its north and west. Although far less popular there, it is nonetheless also legal in Nigeria's east and south.

Polygyny varies according to a woman's age, religion and educational experience. Research conducted in the city of Ibadan, the second largest city in Nigeria, shows that non-educated women are significantly more likely (58%) to be in a polygynous union compared to college educated women (4%). Followers of traditional African religions are expected to have as many wives as they can afford. Muslim men are allowed up to 4 wives and only if they can be provided for and treated equally. Christians are typically (and expected to be) monogamous.

Among the Ngwa group in Eastern Nigeria, studies show that 70% of polygynous marriages consist of illiterate men and women, compared to 53% in monogamous marriages.

==== Malawi ====
While polygynous marriages are not legally recognized under the civil marriage laws of Malawi, customary law affords a generous amount of benefits to polygynous unions, ranging from inheritance rights to child custody. It has been estimated that nearly one in five women in Malawi live in polygynous relationships.

Efforts to abolish the practice and de facto recognition of polygyny have been widely apparent throughout the recent years in Malawi; led mainly by anti-AIDS organizations and feminist groups. An effort led in 2008 to outlaw polygyny in the country was fiercely opposed by Islamic religious leaders, citing the practice as a cultural, religious and pragmatic reality of the nation.

==== South Africa ====
Polygynous marriages are legal under certain circumstances in South Africa. All polygynous marriages entered into in accordance with the provisions of the Recognition of Customary Marriages Act are legal. Polygyny in South Africa is practiced among the indigenous Bantu ethnic groups of South Africa, and also within the Muslim community. Although it was widespread in ancient times, it is now only common amongst richer men and men of status, such as chiefs and kings, including the former President of the Republic of South Africa, Jacob Zuma. Polygynous marriages of individuals over the age of 15 accounts for approximately 30,000 (0.1%) people in 2001. Both Islamic law and cultural family laws create a system in which Muslim men are encouraged to take up to four wives. Several factors for this include infertility or long-term illness of the first wife, excessive wealth on the part of the husband enabling him to support widowed or divorced mothers, and the economic benefits of large families.

Despite the historical and cultural history of polygyny among Muslim South Africans, polygynous unions are officially illegal on the national level in South Africa. After 1994, various laws such as the freedom of religion in the South African Constitution, the ratification of the UN's Convention on the Elimination of All Forms of Discrimination Against Women and a proposed Draft Bill on Muslim Marriages have tackled the issue of Islamic polygynous unions in South Africa.

==== Somalia ====
Polygyny is legal in Somalia and most commonly seen throughout Muslim communities. According to the Muslim tradition, men can have up to four wives. For a man to gain additional wives in Somalia, it must be granted by the court and it has to be proven that the first wife is either imprisoned or infertile.

==== Mozambique ====
Mozambique prohibits legal recognition of polygamous unions, yet there are no legal restrictions against the practice itself, which has been reported to be quite widespread in the coastal country. As of 2019, it was estimated that about nearly 20% of married women aged 15–49 are in polygynous unions.

=== Australia ===
Polygyny is not legal in Australia. The Marriage Act of 1961 under section 94 states that any person who knowingly marries another whose marriage is legally ongoing carries out the act of bigamy. The penalty of bigamy is up to five years of imprisonment. The Full Court of the Family Court of Australia ruled on March 6, 2016, that it is illegal to have polygamous marriages. However, foreign marriages that have potential to be polygamous when it was started will be legally recognized in Australia. The court defined a potentially polygamous marriage as if the marriage is not yet polygamous, but if the country where the marriage marginally taken place permits polygamous marriages of either partner to the original marriage at a later date. Indigenous populations of Australia have been noted to engage in polygamous relationships.

=== Asia ===
Many majority-Muslim countries retain the traditional Sharia, which interprets teachings of the Quran to permit polygamy with up to four wives. Exceptions to this include Albania, Tunisia, Turkey, and former Soviet republics. Though about 70% of the population of Albania is historically Muslim, the majority is non-practicing. Turkey and Tunisia are countries with overwhelmingly Muslim populations that enforce secularist practices by law. In the former Soviet republics, a prohibition against polygamy has been inherited from Soviet law. In the 21st century, a revival of the practice of polygamy in the Muslim world has contributed to efforts to re-establish its legality and legitimacy in some countries and communities where it is illegal.

Proposals have been made to re-legalize polygamy in other ex-Soviet Muslim republics, such as Kazakhstan, Azerbaijan and Uzbekistan.

The original wife (or legal wife) was referred to as the zhèngshì (Chinese: 正室; Korean: 정실, jeongsil; lit. 'main room') in China, Japan and Korea, with dàpó (Chinese: 大婆; 'big woman, big wife') as the slang term. The official wife was called 'big mother' (simplified Chinese: 大妈; traditional Chinese: 大媽; pinyin: dàmā), mother, or aunt. The child of the concubine addressed the big mother as "aunt".

The written word for the second woman was cèshì (simplified Chinese: 侧室; traditional Chinese: 側室; Korean: 측실, cheuksil) and literally means '[she who occupies] the side room'. This word was also used in both Korea and Japan. They were also called qiè (Chinese: 妾; 첩, cheop) in China and Korea. The common terms referring to the second woman, and the act of having the second woman respectively, are èrnǎi (Chinese: 二奶), literally 'the second wife'.

==== India ====
Polygamy in India is, in general, prohibited and the vast majority of marriages are legally monogamous. Polygyny among Christians was banned in the late 19th century, while The Hindu Marriage Act, 1955 banned polygyny for Hindus. Currently, polygyny is only allowed among Muslims; but it is strongly discouraged by public policy. Muslims are subject to the terms of The Muslim Personal Law (Shariat) Application Act of 1937, interpreted by the All India Muslim Personal Law Board. Prevalence of polygyny in India is very low: among married women, only 1.68 percent of Hindus, 2.45 percent of Muslims, 2.16 percent of Christians, and 1.16 percent of other religions live in polygynous marriages.

==== China ====
In mainland China, polygamy is illegal under the Civil Code passed in 2020. This codified a similar 1950 and 1980 prohibition.

Polygyny where wives are of equal status had always been illegal in China, and had been considered a crime in some dynasties. In family laws from Tang to Qing Dynasties, the status of a wife, concubines and maid-mistresses could not be altered. However, concubinage was supported by law until the end of the Qing/Ching dynasty of the imperial China (1911). In the past, Emperors could and often did have hundreds to thousands of concubines. Rich officials and merchants of the elite also took concubines in addition to legal wives. The first wife was the head or mother wife; other wives were under her headship if the husband was away. Concubines had a lower status than full wives, generally not being seen in public with their husband and not having rights to decisions in the house. Children from concubines were considered inferior to those of the wife and did not receive equal wealth/legacy from their father. However they were considered legitimate, therefore had many more rights to inheritance of status and wealth than illegitimate children conceived outside a marriage.

Polygamy was de facto widely practiced in the Republic of China from 1911 to 1949, before Kuomintang was defeated in the Civil War and retreated to Taiwan. Zhang Zongchang, a well-known warlord, notably declared he had three 'unknowns' – unknown number of rifles, unknown amount of money, and unknown number of concubines.

Chinese men in Hong Kong could practice concubinage by virtue of the Qing Code. This ended with the passing of the Marriage Reform Ordinance (Cap. 178) in 1970. Kevin Murphy of the International Herald Tribune reported on the cross-border polygamy phenomenon in Hong Kong in 1995. In a research paper of Humboldt University of Berlin on sexology, Doctor Man-Lun Ng estimated about 300,000 men in China have mistresses. In 1995, forty percent of extramarital affairs in Hong Kong involved a stable partner.

Period drama and historical novels frequently refer to the former culture of polygamy (usually polygyny). An example is the Wuxia novel The Deer and the Cauldron by Hong Kong writer Louis Cha, in which the protagonist Wei Xiaobao has seven wives (In a later edition of the novel, Princess Jianning was assigned as the wife, while others are concubines).

==== Kyrgyzstan ====
A proposal to decriminalize polygamy was heard by the Kyrgyz parliament. It was supported by the Justice Minister, the country's ombudsman, and the Muslim Women's organization Mutakalim, which had gathered 40,000 signatures in favour of polygamy. But, on March 26, 2007, parliament rejected the bill. President Kurmanbek Bakiyev is known to oppose legalizing polygyny.

==== Tajikistan ====
Due to an increase in the number of polygamous marriages, proposals were made in Tajikistan to re-legalize polygamy. Tajik women who want to be second wives particularly support decriminalizing polygyny. Mukhiddin Kabiri, the Deputy Chairman of the Islamic Renaissance Party of Tajikistan, says that legislation is unlikely to stop the growth in polygyny. He criticizes the ruling élite for speaking out against the practice while taking more than one wife themselves.

==== Yemen ====
Polygyny is legal in Yemen, a majority Muslim nation, which follows Islamic tradition where polygyny is acceptable up to four wives only if the husband treats all wives justly. Seven percent of married women in Yemen are a part of polygamous relationship. Reports conducted in the country have shown that rural regions are more likely to have polygamous relationships than those in cities or coastal areas.

=== Europe ===
==== Bosnia and Herzegovina ====
The Muslim communities of Bosnia and Herzegovina traditionally practiced polygamy but the practice was last observed in Cazinska Krajina in the early 1950s. Although illegal in the country, polygamy is encouraged by certain religious circles, and the number of practitioners has increased. This trend appears linked with the advent of fundamentalist Wahhabism in the Balkans.

The Bosniak population in neighbouring Raška, Serbia, has also been influenced by this trend in Bosnia. They have suggested creating an entire Islamic jurisdiction including polygamy, but these proposals have been rejected by Serbia. The top cleric, the Mufti of Novi Pazar, Muamer Zukorlić, has taken a second wife.

==== Russia ====
Factual polygamy and sexual relationships with several adult partners are not punishable in accordance with current revisions of Criminal Code of Russia and Code of the Russian Federation on Administrative Offenses. But multiple marriage cannot be registered and officially recognised by Russian authorities because Family Code of Russia (section 14 and others) prohibits registration of marriage if one of person is in another registered marriage in Russia or another country. Polygamy is tolerated in predominantly Muslim republics such as Chechnya, Ingushetia, and Dagestan.

Chechen politician Ramzan Kadyrov actively advocated for polygynous marriage to gain legal recognition. Muslim leaders such as Talgat Tadzhuddin also pushed for the legal recognition of polygynous marriage.

Polygyny was legalized and documented in unrecognised Chechen Republic of Ichkeria but Russian authorities had annulled these polygynous marriages after they regained control over territory of Ichkeria. Later Ramzan Kadyrov, President of the Chechen Republic, has been quoted on radio as saying that the depopulation of Chechnya by war justifies legalizing polygamy. Kadyrov has been supported by Nafigallah Ashirov, the Chairman of the Council of Grand Muftis of Russia, who has said that polygamy is already widespread among Muslim communities of the country.

In Ingushetia in July, 1999 polygyny was officially recognised and allowed by edict of president of Ingushetia Ruslan Aushev and registration of polygyny marriages had been started allowing men to marry up to four wives as it relates to Muslim tradition. But this edict had been formally suspended soon by edict of President of Russia Boris Yeltsin. One year later this edict of Aushev had been cancelled by the Supreme Court of Ingushetia because of contradiction with Family Code of Russia.

Although non-Muslim Russian populations have historically practiced monogamy, Russian politician Vladimir Zhirinovsky offered to legalize polygyny to encourage population growth and correct the demographic crisis of Russians. Zhirinovsky first proposed to legalize polygyny in 1993, after Kadyrov's declaration that he would introduce an amendment to legalize polygyny for all Russian citizens.

==== Serbia ====
Serbian Law, which in turn is based on the French Civil Code, permits individuals to only be married monogamously. However, the jurisdiction of the civil law exclusively oversees the marriages conducted in civilian ceremonies, and not those conducted in the religious ones. Given that the law does not require couples to register a religious marriage in the registry of civil marriages (whilst in the neighbouring Bosnia, failing to do so can result in a fine), individuals seeking to practice polygamy are not restricted to do so. One of the best known examples was the chief Mufti of the Islamic Community in Serbia, Dr. Muamer Zukorlic, who was simultaneously married to three women.

==== United Kingdom ====
In the UK, there are believed to be up to 20,000 polygamous marriages in Britain's Muslim community, even though bigamy is an offence. All marriages that happen within the United Kingdom must be monogamous and meet the requirements of the relevant legislation to be perceived as legitimately substantial. For polygamous unions in the UK to be viewed as valid, the people must live in a country where a person is allowed to have more than one spouse and get married in a nation that permits it. There is evidence of unregistered polygamous marriages in the UK, performed through religious ceremonies, that are not recognized under UK law.

=== The Americas ===
==== Chile ====
Polygyny has a long history among the Mapuche people of southern South America. Wives that share the same husband are often relatives, such as sisters, who live in the same community. Having the same husband does not imply women belong to the same household. Mapuche polygamy has no legal recognition in Chile. This puts women who are not legally married to their husband at disadvantage to any legal wife in terms of securing inheritance. It is thought that present-day polygamy is much less common than it once was, in particularly compared with the time before the Occupation of Araucanía (1861–1883) when Araucanía lost its autonomy. Albeit chiefly rural, Mapuche polygamy has also been reported in the low-income peripheral communes of Santiago.

==== North America ====
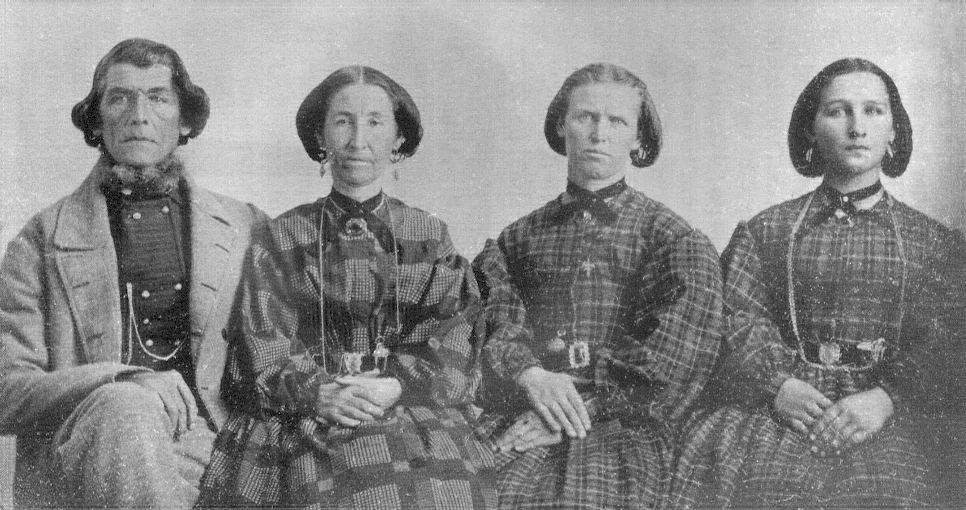
Polygyny among 19th century Mormons: Portrait of Ira Eldredge with his three wives: Nancy Black Eldredge, Hannah Mariah Savage Eldredge, and Helvig Marie Andersen Eldredge.

Polygyny is illegal in the United States and Canada.

Mormon fundamentalism believes in the validity of selected fundamental aspects of Mormonism as taught and practiced in the nineteenth century. Fundamentalist Latter-Day Saints' teachings include plural marriage, a form of polygyny first taught by Joseph Smith, the founder of the Latter Day Saint movement.

In the 21st century, several sources have claimed as many as 60,000 fundamentalist Latter-day Saints in the United States, with fewer than half of them living in polygamous households. Others have suggested that there may be as few as 20,000 Mormon fundamentalists with only 8,000 to 15,000 practicing polygamy. The largest Mormon fundamentalist groups are the Fundamentalist Church of Jesus Christ of Latter Day Saints (FLDS Church) and the Apostolic United Brethren (AUB). The FLDS Church is estimated to have 10,000 members residing in the sister cities of Hildale, Utah and Colorado City, Arizona; Eldorado, Texas; Westcliffe, Colorado; Mancos, Colorado; Creston and Bountiful, British Columbia; Pringle, South Dakota, and Montana.

In July 2022, a Mexican judge in the state of Puebla's Eighth District Civil Court authorized the country's first threesome group marriage.

== Religion ==
=== Buddhism ===
Buddhism does not regard marriage as a sacrament – it is a secular affair, and normally Buddhist monks do not participate in it (though in some sects priests do marry). Hence marriage receives no religious sanction. Forms of marriage, in consequence, vary from country to country.

Polygamy in Thailand was legally recognized until 1935. Myanmar outlawed polygyny from 2015. In Sri Lanka, polyandry was legal in the Kingdom of Kandy, but outlawed by British after conquering the kingdom in 1815. When the Buddhist texts were translated into Chinese, the concubines of others were added to the list of inappropriate partners. Polyandry in Tibet was common traditionally, as was polygyny, and having several wives or husbands was never regarded as having sex with inappropriate partners.

The Parabhava Sutta states that "a man who is not satisfied with one woman and seeks out other women is on the path to decline". Other fragments in the Buddhist scripture seem to treat polygamy unfavorably, leading some authors to conclude that Buddhism generally does not approve of it or alternatively regards it as a tolerated, but subordinate, marital model.

=== Christianity ===
Polygamy is not forbidden in the Old Testament. The New Testament is largely silent on polygamy, however, some point to Jesus's repetition of the earlier scriptures, noting that a man and a wife "shall become one flesh". (Note: Genesis 2:24, Matthew 19:3–6) However, some look to Paul's writings to the Corinthians: "Do you not know that he who is joined to a prostitute becomes one body with her? For, as it is written, 'The two will become one flesh.'" (Note: 1 Corinthians 6:16) Supporters of polygamy argue this use of the phrase in relation to prostitution in this verse, means "becoming one flesh" refers to a merely physical, rather than spiritual, union, even when it is used about marriage in other verses.

Most Christian theologians argue that in Matthew 19:3–9 and referring to Genesis 2:24, (Note: Genesis 2:24) Jesus explicitly states a man should have only one wife:

Have ye not read, that he which made them at the beginning made them male and female, And said, For this cause shall a man leave father and mother, and shall cleave to his wife: and they twain shall be one flesh?

— Matthew 19:3–9 (Note: Matthew 19:3–9)

Periodically, Christian reform movements that have aimed at rebuilding Christian doctrine based on the Bible alone (sola scriptura) have at least temporarily accepted polygyny as a Biblical practice. For example, during the Protestant Reformation, in a document referred to simply as Der Beichtrat (or The Confessional Advice ), Martin Luther, whose reformation caused a schism in the Western Christian Church leading to the formation of the Lutheran Church, granted the Landgrave Philip of Hesse, who, for many years, had been living "constantly in a state of adultery and fornication", a dispensation to take a second wife. The double marriage was to be done in secret, however, to avoid public scandal. Some fifteen years earlier, in a letter to the Saxon Chancellor Gregor Brück, Luther stated that he could not "forbid a person to marry several wives, for it does not contradict Scripture." (Ego sane fateor, me non posse prohibere, si quis plures velit uxores ducere, nec repugnat sacris literis.)

The Lutheran World Federation hosted a regional conference in Africa, in which the acceptance of polygynists and their wives into full membership by the Lutheran Church in Liberia was defended as being permissible. The Lutheran Church in Liberia, while permitting men to retain their wives from marriages prior to being received into the Church, does not permit polygynists who have become Christians to marry more wives after they have received the sacrament of Holy Baptism. Evangelical Lutheran missionaries in Maasai also tolerate the practice of polygyny and in Southern Sudan, and some polygynists are becoming Lutheran Christians.

On the other hand, the Roman Catholic Church criticizes polygyny in the Catechism of the Catholic Church. Under paragraph 2387 of "Other offenses against the dignity of marriage" of the Catechism of the Catholic Church, it states "is not in accord with the moral law". Additionally, paragraph 1645 of "The Goods and Requirements of Conjugal Love" states "The unity of marriage, distinctly recognized by our Lord, is made clear in the equal personal dignity which must be accorded to husband and wife in mutual and unreserved affection. Polygamy is contrary to conjugal love which is undivided and exclusive." There are small numbers of Roman Catholic theologians that claim polygyny can be an authentic form of marriage in certain regions such as Africa.

In Sub-Saharan Africa, there has often been a tension between the Western Christian insistence on monogamy and the traditional practice of polygamy. In some instances in recent times there have been moves for accommodation; in other instances, churches have resisted such moves strongly. African Independent Churches have sometimes referred to those parts of the Old Testament that describe polygamy in defending the practice.

=== Hinduism ===
The Hindu scriptures acknowledge numerous occasions of polygyny; it was the norm among kings, the nobility and the extremely wealthy. For instance Pandu, the father of the Pandavas in Mahabharata, had two wives: Kunti and Madri. Similarly, Dashratha had three chief wives: Kausalya, Sumitra, and Kaikeyi. Having more than one wife was a social custom that was believed to increase the prestige of a man. Although many other personalities including Rama had only one wife, as monogamy was regarded as the morally superior type of marriage, polygyny remained customary and widely acceptable among Hindus until it was legally abolished for Hindus in India by the Hindu Marriage Act of 1955.

=== Islam ===
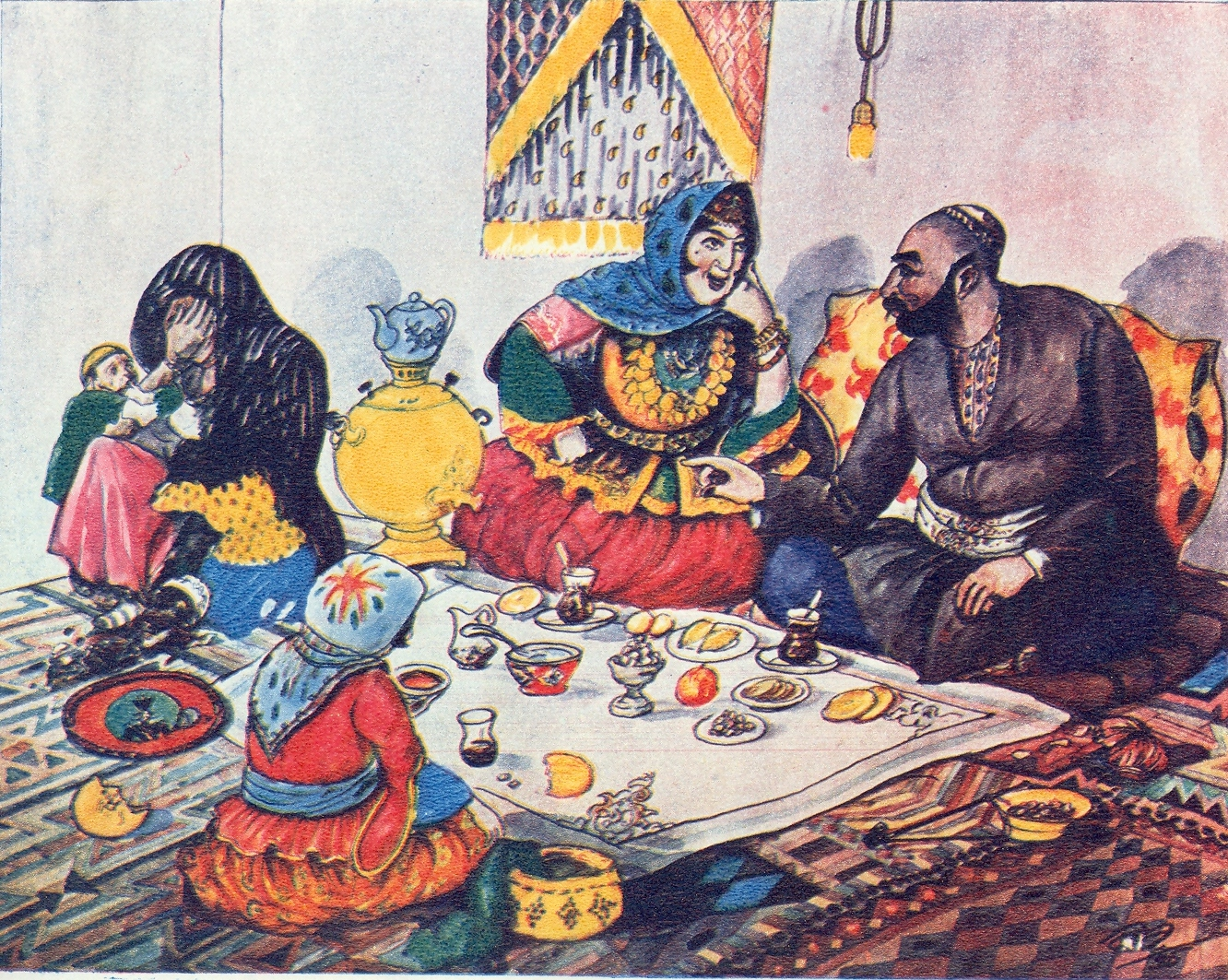
Old wife and a new one (1935) by Azim Azimzade

Under Islamic marital jurisprudence, Muslim men can have up to four wives at a time. Polyandry, the practice of a woman having more than one husband, is not permitted.

Based on verse 30:21 of Quran the ideal relationship is the comfort that a couple find in each other's embrace:

And one of His signs is that He created for you spouses from among yourselves so that you may find comfort in them. And He has placed between you compassion and mercy. Surely in this are signs for people who reflect.

— Surah Ar-Rum 30:21

Polygyny is allowed in the Quran but if a man fears he cannot deal justly with them he should only marry one. This is based on verse 4:3 of Quran which says:

If you fear you might fail to give orphan women their ˹due˺ rights ˹if you were to marry them˺, then marry other women of your choice—two, three, or four. But if you are afraid you will fail to maintain justice, then ˹content yourselves with˺ one or those ˹bondwomen˺ in your possession. This way you are less likely to commit injustice.

— Surah An-Nisa 4:3

There are strict requirements to marrying more than one woman, as the man must treat them equally financially and in terms of support given to each wife, according to Islamic law.

Muslim women are not allowed to marry more than one husband at once. However, in the case of a divorce or their husbands' death they can remarry after the completion of Iddah, as divorce is legal in Islamic law. A non-Muslim woman who flees from her non-Muslim husband and accepts Islam can remarry without divorce from her previous husband, as her marriage with non-Muslim husband is Islamically dissolved on her fleeing. A non-Muslim woman captured during war by Muslims, can also remarry, as her marriage with her non-Muslim husband is Islamically dissolved at capture by Muslim soldiers. This permission is given to such women in verse 4:24 of Quran. The verse also emphasizes transparency, mutual agreement and financial compensation as prerequisites for matrimonial relationship as opposed to prostitution; it says:

Also ˹forbidden are˺ married women—except ˹female˺ captives in your possession. This is God's commandment to you. Lawful to you are all beyond these—as long as you seek them with your wealth in a legal marriage, not in fornication. Give those you have consummated marriage with their due dowries. It is permissible to be mutually gracious regarding the set dowry. Surely God is All-Knowing, All-Wise.

— Surah An-Nisa 4:24

Muhammad was monogamously married to Khadija, his first wife, for 25 years, until she died. After her death, he married multiple women, mostly widows, for social and political reasons. He had a total of nine wives, but not all at the same time, depending on the sources in his lifetime. The Qur'an does not give preference in marrying more than one wife. One reason cited for polygyny is that it allows a man to give financial protection to multiple women, who might otherwise not have any support (e.g. widows). However, the wife can set a condition, in the marriage contract, that the husband cannot marry another woman during their marriage. In such a case, the husband cannot marry another woman as long as he is married to his wife. According to traditional Islamic law, each of those wives keeps their property and assets separate; and are paid mahar and maintenance separately by their husband. Usually the wives have little to no contact with each other and lead separate, individual lives in their own houses, and sometimes in different cities, though they all share the same husband.

In most Muslim-majority countries, polygyny is legal with Kuwait being the only one where no restrictions are imposed on it. The practice is illegal in Muslim-majority Turkey, Tunisia, Albania, Kosovo and the Central Asian countries. Kazakhstan is the only country among the Central Asian states [namely Turkmenistan, Tajikistan, Kyrgyzstan and Uzbekistan] to not criminalize polygyny.

Countries that allow polygyny typically also require a man to obtain permission from his previous wives before marrying another; they may require the man to prove that he can financially support multiple wives. In Malaysia and Morocco, a man must justify taking an additional wife at a court hearing before he is allowed to do so. In Sudan, the government encouraged polygyny in 2001 to increase the population.

=== Judaism ===
Polygyny is permitted by the Bible with certain restrictions (e.g., Exodus 21:10), and numerous Biblical figures are recorded as having multiple wives. In practice, though, the incidence of polygyny among ancient Jews was limited, and likely was largely restricted to the wealthy.

Since the 11th century, Ashkenazi Jews have followed Gershom ben Judah's ban on polygyny (except in rare circumstances). Some Mizrahi (Middle Eastern) Jewish communities (particularly Yemenite Jews and Persian Jews) discontinued polygyny more recently, after they immigrated to countries where it was forbidden or illegal. Israel prohibits polygamy by law, and Mizrahi Jews are not permitted to enter into new polygamous marriages in Israel, though existing polygamous marriages may be maintained. Polygamy may still occur in non-European Jewish communities that exist in countries where it is not forbidden, such as Jewish communities in Iran or Morocco.

== In nature ==
In zoology the term polygyny is used for a pattern of mating in which a male animal has more than one female mate in a breeding season. Males get their mates by defending the females directly or holding resources that the females want and need. This is known as resource defense polygyny and males of the bee species Anthidium manicatum (also known as the European wool carder bee) exhibit this behavior. Males claim patches of floral plants, ward off conspecific males and other resource competitors, and mate with the multiple females who forage in their territories. Males of many species attract females to their territory by either gathering in a lek or going out in search of dispersed females. In polygyny relationships in animals, the female is the one who provides most of the parental care for the offspring.

Solitary species of insects take part in this practice in order to maximize their reproductive success of the widely dispersed females, such as the bee species Anthidium maculosum. Insects such as red flour beetles use polygyny to reduce inbreeding depression and thus maximize reproductive success.

There is primary polygyny (several queens join to found a new colony, but after the hatching of the first workers the queens fight each other until only one queen survives and the colony becomes monogynous) and secondary polygyny (a well-established colony continues to have several queens).

== See also ==
- Cairo Declaration on Human Rights in Islam
- Concubinage
- Cuckold
- Cuckquean
- Legal status of polygamy
- Monogamy
- Mormonism and polygamy
- Plaçage
- Polyandry
- Polygamy
- Polygamy in Christianity
- Polygyny in Islam
- Polygyny threshold model
- Unicorn hunting
- Zephaniah Kingsley

== Notes ==
=== Sources ===
- Boserup, Ester (1970). "The economics of polygamy". Woman's role in economic development. New York; London: St. Martin's Press; George Allen & Unwin. pp. 37–52.
- Little, Kenneth (1967) [1951]. "Marriage and 'Friendship'". The Mende of Sierra Leone: A West African People in Transition. London: Routledge & Kegan Paul. pp. 140–162.
