= Same-sex union court cases =

Same-sex marriage is legal in the following countries: Andorra, Argentina, Australia, Austria, Belgium, Brazil, Canada, Chile, Colombia, Costa Rica, Cuba, Denmark, (Note: Including Denmark proper, Greenland and the Faroe Islands.) Ecuador, Estonia, Finland, France, Germany, Greece, Iceland, Ireland, Liechtenstein, Luxembourg, Malta, Mexico, Nepal, the Netherlands, (Note: The Netherlands proper, as well as the special Caribbean municipalities of Bonaire, Saba, and Sint Eustatius, and the constituent countries of Aruba and Curaçao. Same-sex marriages performed there are also recognized in Sint Maarten.) New Zealand, (Note: New Zealand proper.) Norway, Portugal, Slovenia, South Africa, Spain, Sweden, Switzerland, Taiwan, Thailand, the United Kingdom, (Note: All jurisdictions except the Commonwealth Caribbean and Bermuda.) the United States, (Note: 50 states, the District of Columbia, Guam, the Northern Mariana Islands, Puerto Rico, the United States Virgin Islands and some tribal nations (but not in American Samoa).) and Uruguay. Same-sex marriage is recognized, but not performed in Israel.

An alternative form of legal recognition other than marriage is recognized in Bolivia, Croatia, Cyprus, the Czech Republic, Hungary, Italy, Latvia, Lithuania, Monaco, Montenegro, and San Marino.

== International level ==
Several attempts have been made to establish a right to same-sex marriage at the international level through strategic litigation, at the Human Rights Committee of the United Nations and at the European Court of Human Rights, both of which currently have not yet recognized an equal right to marry for same-sex couples. The Human Rights Committee case was in 1999, with two same-sex couples as the plaintiffs/petitioners and the government of New Zealand as the defender/respondent. The ECHR case, Schalk and Kopf v Austria, was in 2010, with a same-sex couple as the plaintiffs/petitioners and the government of Austria as the respondents. Although both New Zealand and Austria then responded against the petitions then in each case, both countries now legally recognize same-sex marriage. However, new cases were raised regarding same-sex marriage recognition, e.g. Andersen v. Poland.

=== Inter-American Court of Human Rights ruling ===
On 8 January 2018, the Inter-American Court of Human Rights (IACHR) ruled that the American Convention on Human Rights mandates and requires the legalisation of same-sex marriage. The landmark ruling was fully binding on Costa Rica and set binding precedent in the other signatory countries. The Court recommended that governments issue temporary decrees legalising same-sex marriage until new legislation is brought in. The ruling applies to the countries of Barbados, Bolivia, Chile, Costa Rica, the Dominican Republic, Ecuador, El Salvador, Guatemala, Haiti, Honduras, Mexico, Nicaragua, Panama, Paraguay, Peru and Suriname. The Costa Rican Government subsequently announced that it would implement the ruling "in its totality", and the Government of Panama has also signalled that it would accept the ruling.

=== Coman and Others v Inspectoratul General pentru Imigrări and Ministerul Afacerilor Interne ===
On 5 June 2018, the European Court of Justice ruled that European Union member states must recognise the freedom of movement and residency rights of same-sex spouses, provided one partner is an EU citizen. The Court ruled that EU member states may choose whether or not to allow same-sex marriage, but they cannot obstruct the freedom of residence of an EU citizen and their spouse. Furthermore, the Court ruled that the term "spouse" is gender-neutral, and that it does not necessarily imply a person of the opposite sex.

== National level ==
Jurisdiction	End date	Description	Restrictions unconstitutional?
United States	1972	The Supreme Court of the United States dismissed Baker v. Nelson "for want of a substantial federal question". This decision was overturned in June 2015 by the same court in the case Obergefell v. Hodges.	No
Netherlands	1990	The Supreme Court of the Netherlands ruled that is not discriminatory not to allow same-sex couples to marry, because marriage is open to procreation. However, the Hoge Raad stated that the Parliament is free to grant to same-sex couples most of marriage rights.	No
Israel	1994	An Israeli court ruled that same-sex couples are entitled to the same common law benefits as opposite-sex couples.	Yes
Israel	1995	An Israeli court ruled that same-sex couples were entitled to further benefits.	Yes
Israel	1996	An Israeli court ruled that same-sex couples were entitled to even further benefits.	Yes
New Zealand	December 1997	The Court of Appeal of New Zealand ruled in Quilter v Attorney-General that marriage under common law was between one man and one woman, and the common law ban on same-sex marriage was not discriminatory under the New Zealand Bill of Rights Act 1990.	No
South Africa	February 1998	The Transvaal Provincial Division in Langemaat v Minister of Safety and Security ordered a medical aid scheme to register the same-sex life partner of a member as a dependent, ruling that scheme regulations excluding same-sex partners were unconstitutionally discriminatory.	Yes
Canada	1999	The Supreme Court of Canada ruled in M. v. H. that cohabiting same-sex partners in a common-law marriage were entitled to the same rights as unmarried cohabiting opposite-sex partners.	Yes
South Africa	December 1999	The Constitutional Court ruled in National Coalition for Gay and Lesbian Equality v Minister of Home Affairs that foreign same-sex partners of South Africans are entitled to the same immigration benefits as foreign spouses.	Yes
Israel	2000	An Israeli court ruled that same-sex couples were entitled to pension benefits.	Yes
Israel	2001	Common-law status is once again expanded to allow a partner to claim guardianship of the other's child.	Yes
South Africa	July 2002	The Constitutional Court ruled in Satchwell v President of the Republic of South Africa that pensions and other financial benefits provided by an employer to spouses must also be provided to same-sex life partners who have undertaken a reciprocal duty of support.	Yes
South Africa	September 2002	The Constitutional Court ruled in Du Toit v Minister of Welfare and Population Development that same-sex partners are entitled to adopt children jointly and to adopt each other's children as if they were married.	Yes
Venezuela	2003	The Supreme Court of Venezuela ruled that the government is free to introduce measures that provide for economic benefits to same-sex couples, though it is not bound by law to do so.	No
South Africa	March 2003	The Constitutional Court ruled in J v Director General, Department of Home Affairs that children born to lesbian life-partners through artificial insemination are to be regarded as legitimate in law and that both partners must be registered as the legal parents.	Yes
Austria	2003	The European Court of Human Rights ruled that same-sex couples must be recognized under common-law status equal to opposite-sex couples.	Yes
South Korea	July 2004	A lesbian couple who have lived together for 20 years has made a palimony suit the property division by eliminating de facto marriage.	No
Israel	January 2005	The Supreme Court expanded the common-law status to include for adoption of a partner's child.	Yes
South Africa	December 2005	The Constitutional Court ruled in Minister of Home Affairs v Fourie that restricting marriage to opposite-sex couples was unconstitutional. The ruling, however, was suspended for one year to allow Parliament time to enact legislation to rectify the inequality.	Yes
Costa Rica	May 2006	The Supreme Court of Costa Rica ruled 5–2 that restricting marriage to opposite-sex couples was not unconstitutional.	No
United Kingdom	July 2006	In Wilkinson v. Kitzinger and Others the High Court ruled that recognizing same-sex marriages performed abroad as "civil partnerships" over marriages was not discriminatory.	No
Israel	November 2006	The Supreme Court of Israel ruled that the government must recognize same-sex marriages performed abroad on par with opposite-sex marriages that have been performed abroad.	Yes
South Africa	November 2006	Days before same-sex marriage became legal, the Constitutional Court ruled in Gory v Kolver NO that a same-sex life partner is entitled to inherit automatically when the other partner dies without a will.	Yes
Brazil	2006	A 2006 decision issued by the Superior Tribunal de Justiça stated that same-sex couples qualify as de facto partners.	Yes
Colombia	February 2007	A Colombian court ruled that some common law benefits must be extended to same-sex couples.	Yes
Colombia	January 2009	The Constitutional Court of Colombia later ruled that benefits for cohabiting same-sex couples must be expanded to give them equality with cohabiting opposite-sex couples.	Yes
Slovenia	July 2009	The Constitutional Court of Slovenia ruled that the registered partnership law excluding registered partners from inheritance rights was discriminatory and gave the Parliament six months to respond to the ruling.	Yes
Portugal	July 2009	The Constitutional Court of Portugal ruled 3–2 that the statutory ban on same-sex marriage does not violate the Portuguese constitutional provision that prohibits discrimination based on sexual orientation.	No
Russia	January 2010	Two lesbians who recently married in Canada announced their intention to push for its recognition within Russia. Russian courts have ruled that the two are not legally able to marry, and thus the two women are seeking to use a loophole for recognition only.	No
Poland	March 2010	The European Court of Human Rights ruled that homosexuals have the right to inherit from their partners.	Yes
Italy	April 2010	The constitutionality of Italy's refusal to grant marriage licenses to same-sex couples was questioned before the Constitutional Court. In April 2010, the court rejected the bids from Italian couples.	No
Austria	June 2010	Schalk and Kopf v. Austria challenges the validity of Austria's marriage laws in the European Court of Human Rights.	No
Mexico	August 2010	After affirming the constitutionality of Mexico City's same-sex marriage law, the Supreme Court ruled that all Mexican states are required to recognize the marriages.	Yes
Germany	August 2010	The Constitutional Court of Germany ruled that the twenty-point higher inheritance tax for registered partners as opposed to married opposite-sex couples violated the constitution. The government had until 2011 to amend the law.	Yes
France	January 2011	France's highest court of appeal, the Court of Cassation, on November 17, 2010, asked the Constitutional Council to decide whether Articles 75 and 144 of the Civil Code are inconsistent with the preamble and Article 66 of the French constitution. On January 28, 2011, the Council ruled that the law banning same-sex marriage is constitutional.	No
Brazil	May 2011	On May 5, 2011, the Supreme Federal Court ruled 10-0 that same-sex stable unions must be recognized. This decision paved the way for future legalization on same-sex matrimonial rights.	Yes
Brazil	June 2011	A judge in São Paulo converted a stable union into a civil marriage.	Yes
Colombia	July 2011	The Constitutional Court of Colombia ruled that same-sex couples are at a legal disadvantage by being excluded from marriage and ordered Congress to rectify this issue by June 20, 2013. If the deadline is not met, same-sex couples would thenceforth be able to get married by a judge or a notary.	Yes
India	July 2011	The Gurgaon Court [State of Haryana] granted an individual marriage to a lesbian couple.	Yes Individual case
Brazil	October 2011	The Superior Court of Justice ruled that two women can legally marry. Differently from the U.S. Supreme Court's "stare decisis", the Superior Court decision would only reach the authors of the demand, but stood as a precedent that could be followed in similar cases. It is the highest court in Brazil to uphold a same-sex marriage. It overturned two lower courts' rulings against the women. The Court ruled that the Constitution guarantees same-sex couples the right to marry and that the current Civil Code does not prohibit the marriage of two people of the same sex. This decision paved the way for future legalization on same-sex matrimonial rights.	Yes
Chile	December 2011	A Court of Appeals in Santiago asked the Constitutional Court about the validity of Article 102 of the Civil Code that defines marriages only between a man and a woman, after three couples challenged the article. The Constitutional Court rejected their bids in a 9–1 vote, and subsequently, the Court of Appeals rejected the challenges.	No
Italy	March 2012	The Supreme Court of Cassation ruled that same-sex couples are entitled to the same common law benefits as opposite-sex couples.	Yes
Israel	December 2012	Ramat Gan family court allowed a gay couple to divorce.	Yes
Mexico	December 2012	The Supreme Court of Justice of the Nation of Mexico ruled unanimously in favor of three same-sex couples who sued the state of Oaxaca for the right to marry. The ruling does not immediately eliminate marriage bans in other Mexican states, but it does set a legal precedent to begin challenging statewide marriage bans.	Yes
Italy	January 2013	The Supreme Court of Cassation ruled that gay couples can bring up children as well as heterosexual couples. It also said that it was "mere prejudice" to assume that living with a homosexual couple could be detrimental for a child's development.	Yes
Austria	January 2013	The Constitutional Court of Austria ruled that same-sex couples who want to register their partnership will have the same ceremony offered to opposite-sex couples who want to marry. In addition, gay couples will be able to bring the witnesses.	Yes
Australia	February 2013	Court held that the national ban on same-sex marriages did not constitute gender discrimination	No
Paraguay	March 2013	A Paraguayan gay couple asked an Asunceño judge to register their marriage which they performed in Argentina. On 4 April 2013 the judge refused to register the couple's marriage because the Paraguayan Constitution establishes that marriage can only be formed by a man and a woman. The petitioners announced their intentions to appeal the ruling.	No
Italy	May 2013	An Italian judge recognises a civil partnership contracted by two Italian men in the UK. The couple registered their partnership in the local (Milan) Civil union register. It is the first time that occurs in the Italian jurisprudence.	Yes
Brazil	May 2013	On May 14, 2013, the National Justice Council ruled 14-1 that every notary of Brazil must license and perform same-sex marriage and permit the conversion of any same-sex stable union into a marriage. The ruling was published on 15 May and took effect on 16 May 2013.	Yes
United States	June 2013	In United States v. Windsor the Supreme Court of the United States struck down section 3 of the Defense of Marriage Act, which denied federal benefits of marriage to same-sex couples legally married in their own state.	Yes
Colombia	July 2013	A Civil Court in Bogotá ruled that a male same-sex couple has the right to marry.	Yes
Greece	November 2013	In 2008 Greece passed a law which regulated cohabitation but excluded same-sex couples from enjoying the same benefits afforded to opposite-sex couples. On November 7, 2013, in Vallianatos and others v Greece the ECtHR ruled that is discriminatory excluding same-sex couples.	Yes
Italy	2014	The Civil Court of Grosseto ordered the recognition of a marriage contracted by two Italian men in New York. It is the first time that occurs in the Italian jurisprudence. In September 2014 an appellate court in Florence has overruled the lowers court decision. However, the court didn't rule on the constitutionality of the marriage, but insisted that the couple sued the wrong agency. The judges sent the case back to the Civil Court of Grosseto.	Case dismissed
Costa Rica	2014	Two gay couples asked a Costa Rican court on May 16, to be married in a civil union. The request of one couple was declined, but they said they have the intention to appeal the judgement.	United with other similar cases ruled upon in 2018
Costa Rica	June 2015	A gay couple asked a Family Court in 2013 for the right to the benefits of de facto unions afforded to heterosexual couples. On 2 June 2015, the court ruled for the plaintiffs granting them pension, visitation and inheritance rights in their verdict. The couple became the first in the nation to have a same-sex union recognised. The effects of the ruling are on hold while a judicial review of a law referenced in the judge's opinion is pending.	
United States	June 2015	In Obergefell v. Hodges the Supreme Court of the United States held that the Equal Protection Clause and the Due Process Clause of the Fourteenth Amendment require all states to license marriage between two people of the same sex and recognize those marriages performed in other jurisdictions.	Yes
Colombia	April 2016	The Constitutional Court unified the criteria after Congress did not meet its 2013 deadline and, in practice, only some judges were performing marriages. The 2016 ruling indicates that judges and notaries are obliged to issue marriage licenses to same-sex couples.	Yes
China	2016	The court in central Changsha dismissed the suit brought against the civil affairs bureau for refusing to issue a marriage license to a gay couple. One of the plaintiffs, 26-year-old Sun Wenlin, said he would appeal the decision.	No
South Korea	December 2016	After Seodeamun-gu office refused to grant marriage licenses to a same-sex couple, they asked a court on May 21, 2014, to be married. The first oral argument was held on July 6, 2015, in Seoul. On 25 May 2016, the district court ruled against the couple and declared that same-sex marriage can't be granted under the current laws. The couple quickly filed an appeal against the district court ruling. In December 2016 the ruling was upheld by the Court of Appeal. The couple announced they would petition the Supreme Court.	No [Appealed ?]
Estonia	January 2017	The Tallinn Circuit Court recognized one marriage performed in Sweden, declaring that out-of state marriages are governed by the countries statutes they are concluded under, thus granting foreign same-sex spouses the same-rights as domestic opposite-sex spouses.	Yes
Italy	February 2017	The Supreme Court recognized one marriage performed in France between an Italian women and her French partner by rejecting an appeal to the ruling from a Naples court recognizing the marriage.	Yes Individual case
Taiwan	May 2017	On 24 May 2017 the Constitutional Court ruled that same-sex couples have a right to marry, and gave the legislature two years to adequately amend Taiwanese marriage laws. According to the court ruling, if amendments are not passed within two years, same-sex marriages will automatically become legal. Same-sex marriage became legal on 24 May 2019.	Yes
Estonia	June 2017	The Supreme Court of Estonia ruled that same-sex couples have a right to the protection of family life. Clarifying the courts' jurisdiction in the matter of applying legal protection in residence permit disputes, the Court ruled that Estonian law does not forbid issuing a residence permit to same-sex spouses.	Yes
Greece	November 2017	A couple married by the Greek municipality of Tilos in June 2008 sought to have their marriage recognized. However, the Supreme Court upheld earlier rulings by lower courts rejecting the legality of their marriage and thereby annulling it.They are expected to bring their case to the ECHR.	No [Appealed ?]
Austria	December 2017	The Constitutional Court ruled that same-sex couples have a right to marry, and gave the legislature until 01.12.2019 to adequately amend the Austrian Civil Code. According to the court ruling, if amendments are not passed until the date given, same-sex marriages will automatically become legal.The plaintiffs were allowed to marry immediately.	Yes
Bulgaria	January 2018	The case of a Bulgarian couple that had married in the UK sought to have their marriage recognized in Bulgaria. The Sofia Administrative Court rejected their case labelling it "against the public order".	No
Hungary	February 2018	The Budapest District Court ruled that foreign same-sex marriages have to be given the same rights domestic civil unions are given.	Yes
Estonia	April 2018	The Supreme Court of Estonia held that despite the lack of implementing measures the Registered Partnership Act has taken effect and is valid as it found the denial of recognition to same-sex couples unconstitutional.	Yes
Nepal	June 2018	The Supreme Court of Nepal held that denying a dependent visa for a foreign same-sex spouse of a Nepalese citizen is unlawful, as the Immigration Rules do not specify the gender of the spouse. The plaintiffs married in the U.S.	Yes
Costa Rica	August 2018	Sala IV of the Constitutional Court ruled two articles of the Family Code (§14; §242) and article 4 of the Law of Young People unconstitutional giving lawmakers 18 months to amend the lawbooks in order to legalize same-sex marriage. If they fail to do so, it will become legal automatically.	Yes
Lithuania	January 2019	The Constitutional Court ruled that foreign same-sex spouses have to be granted equal residency rights.	Yes
El Salvador	January 2019	The "Sala de lo Constitucional" is studying whether to admit or not a case against article 11 of the Family code which defines marriage as "the legal union between a man and a woman". It was then rejected on procedural ground.	Case dismissed
Poland	February 2019	The case of a Polish couple seeking to get their Portuguese marriage recognized was rejected by the "Wojewódzki Sąd Administracyjny w Warszawie" but the court also ruled that the Polish constitution does not prohibit same-sex marriage.	No
Ecuador	June 2019	On 29 June 2018 a Judge in Cuenca admitted two same-sex marriages relying on the IACRH ruling. However, this decision was overruled by the Labor Chamber of the Provincial Court of Justice due to an appeal by the Civil Registry. The case was heard by the Constitutional Court, which then voted 5-4 that the IACRH ruling is applicable, thus legalizing same-sex marriage in Ecuador.	Yes
Estonia	July 2019	The Supreme Court of Estonia held one section of the Aliens Act unconstitutional, thereby granting residency rights for same-sex couples married abroad equal to those of different-sex couples.	Yes
Philippines	September 2019	Arguments at the Supreme Court of the Philippines on same-sex marriage in response as part of the Falcis III vs. Civil Registrar-General case were heard June 19, 2018. They were rejected on procedural grounds in September 2019. The case was dismissed due to Falcis III not seeking marriage for himself or has presented an actual case.	Case dismissed
Poland	February 2020	A case brought to the attention of the Civil Registrar to recognise same-sex marriage between a citizen of Poland and the United Kingdom. The Supreme Administrative court ruled that recognising same-sex marriage contracted abroad would undermine the Polish legal system, that the denial to recognise marriage does not interfere with the right to family life. The case was later taken to the European Court of Human Rights as Andersen v. Poland.	
Chile	June 2020	After the Constitutial Court ruled in a separate case that marriage is a fundamental right, a couple filed a lawsuit against the Civil Registry in January 2019 for denying them a marriage licence and family protection. After the Court of Appeals refused to admit the case, the Supreme Court interfered in February 2019, ordering the case to continue its legal proceeding through the Court of Appeals. It then ruled the refusal of the Civil Registry not to be illegal. The plaintiffs appealed to the Supreme Court. The petition was then rejected by the Constitutional Court 5–4.	No
Peru	November 2020	The Constitutional Court heard a case on 20 June 2018 regarding the registration and recognition of a marriage performed abroad On 3 Nov 2020, the Court voted 4–3 to reject the petition to register the marriage.	No
Latvia	November 2020	The Constitutional Court ruled that same-sex partners are entitled to paternal leave. Furthermore, they noted that the state has an obligation to protect the families of same-sex partners as well.	Yes
Bolivia	December 2020	A court of first instance ruled that the Civil Register of Bolivia has to recognize a same-sex couple as a "free union", as the denial thereof constitutes discrimination under Bolivian law.	Yes
Japan	March 2021	The Sapporo District Court ruled that the ban on same-sex marriage was inconsistent the constitution's requirement for equal treatment, but left it to the legislature to resolve the problem.	No
Thailand	November 2021	The Constitutional Court of Thailand ruled that the current definition of marriage does not violate the equality clause in the Constitution. Nonetheless, the court called on Parliament and Government to discuss reforms concerning same-sex unions.	No
Honduras	January 2022	In May 2018 two lawsuits were filed regarding same-sex marriage in Honduras, one was rejected due to technical errors. In January 2022, the Supreme Court rejected the appeal seeking access to same-sex marriage. The litigants have announced they will seek redress at the Interamerican Court of Human Rights.	No
Russia	March 2022	The Grand Chamber of the ECtHR accepted the referral of a case against the Russian Government after a Chamber Judgement found the lack of legal recognition for same-sex couples to breach Art. 8 of the EHRC.	Jurisdiction withdrawn when Russia was expelled from the Council of Europe
Peru	June 2022	The Constitutional Court denied an appeal seeking recognition of same-sex marriages conducted in foreign countries, saying the constitution limits marriage to opposite-sex couples. The Court also indicated that it did not believe the country was beholden to the previous Interamerican Court of Human Rights opinion requiring the country to legalize same-sex marriage on the ground that the court had been politicized.	No
Japan	June 2022	The Osaka District Court ruled that the ban on same-sex marriage was constitutional, disagreeing with an earlier ruling by the Sapporo District Court.	No
Slovenia	July 2022	The Constitutional Court ruled that ban same-sex marriage and joint couple adoption violated the constitutional right to equal treatment, and ordered that its ruling take effect immediately. It also ordered Parliament to amend the law to bring it in compliance within six months, which the government announced it would do.	Yes
Suriname	February 2023	The Constitutional Court ruled the ban on same-sex marriage does not violate the constitution or Suriname's obligations under the Interamerican Convention on Human Rights. However, the court also found that the Civil Code is outdated and needs to be modernized following public debate.	No
Panama	March 2023	After a seven-year delay, the Supreme Court of Justice ruled that there is no positive right to same-sex marriage under the Panamanian constitution or law.	No
Namibia	May 2023	In 2017, filing a lawsuit in the Windhoek High Court, a Namibian-South African couple sought to have their South African marriage recognized in Namibia in order to obtain residency rights and get their adopted children recognized as theirs. In 2019 two other cases of same-sex couples married abroad were filed, too. The High Court ruled against them, finding itself bound to a precedent by the Supreme Court. The couple might appeal the court decision. In May 2023, the Supreme Court ruled that the government must recognize foreign same-sex marriages equally to opposite-sex marriages, in accordance with the constitutional protections for equality and dignity.	Yes
Romania	May 2023	In June, 2019, 7 same sex couples filed suit in the ECHR claiming that the lack of legal protection for same-sex relationships is unconstitutional and a breach to a decision by the ECHR (Oliari and Others v. Italy). The ECHR ruled that Romania violates of Art. 8 European Convention on Human Rights in refusing to grant same-sex couples some form of legal recognition.	Yes
Nepal	June 2026	A couple challenged the country's 2017 Civil Code before the Supreme Court, to secure the right for two people of any gender to marry. The hearing was postponed to November 8, 2023. On 28 June 2023, a single judge bench of the Nepal Supreme Court issued a groundbreaking order directing the government to establish a "separate register" for "non-traditional couples and sexual minorities" to "temporarily register" them. However, the Kathmandu District Court rejected a marriage registration application on 13 July. The couple appealed to the Patan High Court, but the High Court rejected the appeal on 6 October 2023. On June 18, 2026 the Supreme Court issued a final, binding directive ordering the government to officially guarantee marriage equality. The court instructed lawmakers to update the civil code and remove all language restricting marriage to "a man and a woman".	Yes
India	October 2023	On 17 October 2023, the Supreme Court ruled unanimously that the legalization of same-sex marriage is a matter for the Parliament to decide, not the courts. In a 3–2 decision, it also ruled against ordering the government to introduce civil unions, and in a separate 3-2 decision, ruled against ordering the government to allow adoption by same-sex couples. The majority opinion of the court also states that transgender people in a heterosexual relationship may marry. However, the court unanimously accepted the government's suggestion that it set up a high-powered committee headed by the Cabinet Secretary to investigate the discrimination faced by LGBT people and study providing limited legal rights and benefits to same-sex couples.	No
Poland	December 2023	The plaintiffs sue the Government of Poland for the lack of legal recognition of same-sex unions in the ECtHR. In December 2023, the ECtHR ruled that the lack of same-sex unions violates the Convention.	Yes
Lithuania	April 2025	The Constitutional Court found that the restriction of civil partnerships to opposite-sex couples was unconstitutional, and allowed same-sex couples to immediately register their partnerships through the courts. The Court also ordered the government to amend the law to bring the civil partnership act into force, and ensure that partners enjoy equal rights to married couples.	Yes
Venezuela	Litigation pending	A case aiming at legalizing same-sex marriage is still pending in the "Tribunal Supremo de Justicia".	
Latvia	Litigation ongoing	In May 2016 the Constitutional Court overturned a lower courts decision to deny a same-sex marriage application, stating that for thought there are no provisions allowing for the recognition of same-sex couples, it must be considered if this lack does not violate the Constitution of Latvia or the European Convention on Human Rights and if it would not be necessary to grant them a protection under terms different from marriage.	
(Georgia (country)) Georgia	Litigation ongoing	A man is challenging that while the civil code of Georgia is explicitly between a man and a woman, the Constitution does not reference sex/gender in its section on marriage. The plea was launched in 2016.	
Albania	Litigation pending	An Albanian LGBT rights group, PRO LGBT, filed a lawsuit in 2017 requesting recognition of same-sex partnerships in the country's Family Code.	
Japan	Litigation pending	On February 14, 2019, 13 same sex couples filed suit in Tokyo, Osaka, Nagoya, and Sapporo claiming that the denial of same-sex marriages is unconstitutional Another three couples filed in Fukuoka a few months later. While the district court in Sapporo ruled in favor of the plaintiffs, the district court in Osaka upheld the same-sex marriage ban. These cases have been all been heard at the appellate High Court level, and all five high courts that have ruled have found that the ban on same-sex marriage is unconstitutional.	
Serbia	Litigation pending	In July, 2019, a lesbian couple launched a legal challenge after being rejected in the civil registry in Novi Sad.	
El Salvador	Litigation pending	In August 2019 La Sala Constitutional accepted a case to review the constitutionality of the articles 11, 90.3 and 118 of the Family Code. LGBT-rights organizations called on the court to respect the IACHR ruling concerning same-sex marriage.	
Botswana	Litigation pending	In Selelo v Acting Director of Civil Registration, Bonolo Selelo and Tsholofelo Kumile are challenging the exclusion of same-sex couples from marriage before the High Court of Botswana. On 4 September 2026, the court admitted LEGABIBO as a co-applicant, three opposing organisations as respondents, and legal academic Onthatile Olerile Moeti as an amicus curiae. The main hearing was scheduled for 22 and 23 October 2026.	

== Subnational level ==
For same-sex marriage court cases seeking to recognize individual marriages in the US states see Same-sex marriage in the United States. For individual amparos and the "México Igualitario" in Mexico see Same-sex marriage in Mexico. For individual injunctions in Brazil see Same-sex marriage in Brazil

Jurisdiction	Country	End date	Description	Restrictions unconstitutional?
(Washington (state)) Washington	United States	1974	Singer v. Hara unsuccessfully challenged the validity Washington's Civil Code ban on same-sex marriage in the Washington Court of Appeals. The Supreme Court of Washington refused to review the decision.	No
Colorado	United States	1985	Adams v. Howerton unsuccessfully argued that the then-current marriage definition was gender neutral, thus giving same-sex marriages validity, in the United States Court of Appeals for the Ninth Circuit, upholding a decision by the United States District Court for the Central District of California. The U.S. Supreme Court refused to review the decision.	No
Alaska	United States	August 1994	Bess v. Ulmer unsuccessfully challenged the validity under the Alaskan Constitution of Alaska's Civil Code ban on same-sex marriage. The Supreme Court of Alaska overturned an earlier court ruling favoring further hearings.	No
Hawaii	United States	December 1999	Baehr v. Miike unsuccessfully challenged the validity of the same-sex marriage ban under the Constitution of Hawaii. The Supreme Court of Hawaii overturned an earlier court ruling favoring legalization, as a newly passed constitutional amendment limited the provisions the lower court relied on.	No
Vermont	United States	December 1999	In Baker v. Vermont the Vermont Supreme Court found that the Constitution of Vermont mandates to grant same-sex couples the same rights as opposite-sex ones. Nonetheless, it did not legalize same-sex marriage.	Yes / No
Florida	United States	2001	In Frandsen v. County of Brevard the Florida Fifth District Court of Appeal found that the denial of marriage licenses to same-sex couples did not violate the state Constitution's equal protection for gender classifications.	No
Ontario	Canada	June 2003	The Court of Appeal for Ontario in the case Halpern v Canada (AG) against the current Civil Code that does not allow for same-sex marriage because it violated the Charter of Rights and ordered that its judgment come into effect immediately,	Yes
British Columbia	Canada	July 2003	The Court of Appeal of British Columbia ordered in Barbeau v. British Columbia 2003 BCCA 251, requiring the Federal Government to legalize same-sex marriage and ordering that the ruling in the Province take effect immediately.	Yes
Massachusetts	United States	November 2003	In Goodridge v. Department of Public Health the Supreme Judicial Court found that the then-current definition of marriage was unconstitutional thus legalizing same-sex marriage.	Yes
(Quebec) Québec	Canada	March 2004	The Québec Court of Appeal ordered in Hendricks and Leboeuf v. Québec, that the wording of marriage be changed form "homme et femme" to "époux" and ordering that it take effect immediately.	Yes
Yukon	Canada	July 2004	The Supreme Court of the Yukon Territory ordered in Dunbar & Edge v. Yukon (Government of) & Canada (A.G.), 2004 YKSC 54, that the Yukon common law definition of marriage be changed immediately to be "the voluntary union for life of two persons to the exclusion of all others."	Yes
Manitoba	Canada	September 2004	The Court of Queen's Bench of Manitoba ordered in Vogel v. Canada, that the same-sex marriage licenses shall be issued in the Province.	Yes
Nova Scotia	Canada	September 2004	The Nova Scotia Supreme Court ordered in Boutilier v. Canada (A.G) and Nova Scotia (A.G), that the then-current law was unconstitutional, thereby legalizing same-sex marriage in the Province	Yes
Saskatchewan	Canada	November 2004	The Court of Queen's Bench of Saskatchewan ordered in N.W. v. Canada (Attorney General), that the then-current law was against the Charter of Human Rights, thereby legalizing same-sex marriage in the Province	Yes
Newfoundland and Labrador	Canada	December 2004	The Supreme Court of Newfoundland ordered the State to issure same-sex marriage licences.	Yes
Oregon	United States	December 2004	In Li and Kennedy v. State of Oregon the Oregon Supreme Court ruled against Multnomah County, stating that it is not entitled to perform same-sex marriages under the current statutes. Nonetheless, the court refused to rule on same-sex marriage by itself.	No
New Brunswick	Canada	April 2005	The Court of Queen's Bench of New Brunswick ordered the State to issue same-sex marriage licences.	Yes
(Washington (state)) Washington	United States	July 2006	Andersen v. King County unsuccessfully challenged Washington's Defense of Marriage Act (DOMA) in the Washington Supreme Court.	No
(New York (state)) New York	United States	July 2006	Hernandez v. Robles unsuccessfully challenged in the Court of Appeal the validity under the States Constitution of its same-sex marriage ban.	No
Nebraska	United States	July 2006	Citizens for Equal Protection v. Bruning unsuccessfully challenged the validity under the United States Constitution of Initiative Measure 416, Nebraska's constitutional ban on same-sex marriage.	No
New Jersey	United States	October 2006	In Lewis v. Harris the Supreme Court that the "unequal dispensation of rights and benefits to committed same-sex partners can no longer be tolerated under our State Constitution." It gave the lawmakers 6 month to introduce Civil Unions.	Yes
Aruba	Netherlands	April 2007	The Supreme Court of the Netherlands ruled that Aruba must recognize all Dutch marriages, including same-sex marriages.	Yes
Netherlands Antilles	Netherlands	April 2007	The Supreme Court of the Netherlands's ruling applied to the Netherlands Antilles in addition to Aruba.	Yes
(New York (state)) New York	United States	February 2008	In Martinez v. County of Monroe the Appellate Court held that New York has to recognize out-of state same-sex marriages as it recognizes all other valid out-of state marriages.	Yes
California	United States	May 2008	In In re Marriage Cases the Supreme Court struck down the then-current ban on same-sex marriage upholding rulings from lower courts.	Yes
Maryland	United States	September 2008	In Conaway v. Deane & Polyak the Court of Appeals held that the then-current definition of marriage did not constitute discrimination under the Maryland Constitution.	No
Connecticut	United States	October 2008	In Kerrigan v. Commissioner of Public Health the Supreme Court of Connecticut held that it is unconstitutional to deny same-sex couples the right to marry, thereby legalizing same-sex marriage.	Yes
Rhode Island	United States	November 2008	The Rhode Island Supreme Court that the lack of legal provisions impeded them from granting divorce to a couple married in Massachusetts.	No
Iowa	United States	April 2009	In Varnum v. Brien the Iowa Supreme Court held that it is unconstitutional to deny same-sex couples the right to marry, thereby legalizing same-sex marriage.	Yes
Wyoming	United States	June 2011	In Christiansen v. Christiansen the Supreme Court of Wyoming granted a Canadien same-sex couple divorce stating that the decision about recognition of foreign same-sex unions would be "left for another day".	Yes Individual case
Alagoas	Brazil	December 2011	The Corregedoria Geral da Justiça of Alagoas ruled that officials have to perform same-sex marriages in the state.	Yes
Maryland	United States	May 2012	In Port v. Cowan the Court of Appeals held that there is no legal reason not to recognize valid foreign marriages or marriages form other jurisdictions where it is legal, thereby legalizing the recognition of foreign same-sex marriages.	Yes
Sergipe	Brazil	July 2012	The Corregedoria Geral da Justiça of Sergipe regulated same-sex marriage in the state by "Provimento nº 06/2012".	Yes
Espírito Santo	Brazil	July 2012	The Corregedoria Geral da Justiça of Espírito Santo issued a "circular letter" telling notaries to perform same-sex marriages in the state.	Yes
Bahia	Brazil	November 2012	The Corregedoria Geral da Justiça of Bahia adopted the current definition of marriage to include same-sex marriages in the state.	Yes
(Federal District (Brazil)) Federal District	Brazil	December 2012	A court in the Federal District found that same-sex marriages could be performed without injunctions in the district.	Yes
Piauí	Brazil	December 2012	The Corregedoria Geral da Justiça of Piauí found that same-sex marriages could be performed without injunctions in the district.	Yes
Montana	United States	December 2012	In Donaldson v. State of Montana the Montana Supreme Court held that the constitutional ban on same-sex marriage does not preclude them from anything but the term marriage and thus does not violate the basic rights of anybody.	No
(São Paulo (state)) São Paulo	Brazil	December 2012	The Corregedoria Geral da Justiça of São Paulo found that same-sex marriages could be performed without injunctions in the district.	Yes
(Paraná (state)) Paraná	Brazil	March 2013	The Corregedoria Geral da Justiça of Paraná found that same-sex marriages are possible under the current procedure.	Yes
Michigan	United States	March 2013	In DeBoer v. Snyder the United States District Court for the Eastern District of Michigan found the marriage restriction unlawful. The decision was appealed to the United States Court of Appeals for the Sixth Circuit and later consolidated with other suits form the Sixth Circuit to Obergefell v. Hodges.	Consolidated to Obergefell v. Hodges
Mato Grosso do Sul	Brazil	April 2013	The Corregedoria Geral da Justiça of Mato Grosso do Sul authorized same-sex marriages.	Yes
(Rio de Janeiro (state)) Rio de Janeiro	Brazil	April 2013	The Corregedoria Geral da Justiça of Rio de Janeiro published a ruling allowing for same-sex marriage if the local judge agrees on it.	Yes
Rondônia	Brazil	April 2013	The Corregedoria Geral da Justiça of Rondônia authorized same-sex marriages.	Yes
Paraíba	Brazil	April 2013	The Corregedoria Geral da Justiça of Paraíba authorized same-sex marriages.	Yes
(Santa Catarina (state)) Santa Catarina	Brazil	April 2013	The Corregedoria Geral da Justiça of Santa Catarina authorized same-sex marriages if both applicants are resident to the state.	Yes
California	United States	June 2013	In Hollingsworth v. Perry the Supreme Court of the United States vacated the decision of the circuit court of appeals and reinstated the original decision of the district court. This has the effect that California's Proposition 8, a voter-approved referendum that took away the right of same sex-marriage that previously had been approved by the state's courts, is struck down and same-sex marriage will resume in California.	Case dismissed Same-sex marriage in California resumes
New Mexico	United States	August 2013	In Hanna v. Salazar the New Mexico Supreme Court ordered the Santa Fe County Clerk to perform same-sex marriages.	Yes
New Mexico	United States	August 2013	In Stark v. Martinez the New Mexico District Court ordered the Taos County Clerk to perform same-sex marriages.	Yes
Illinois	United States	September 2013	The cases Darby v. Orr and Lazaro v. Orr seeking to have same-sex marriages recognized in the state were dismissed.	Dismissed
New Jersey	United States	October 2013	In Garden State Equality v. Dow the New Jersey Superior Court found the then-current definition of marriage to be unconstitutional and thus legalized same-sex marriage. A stay was unanimously rejected by the Supreme Court.	Yes
Tennessee	United States	March 2013	In Tanco v. Haslam the United States District Court for the Middle District of Tennessee granted three couples an injunction. The decision was appealed to the United States Court of Appeals for the Sixth Circuit and later consolidated with other suits form the Sixth Circuit to Obergefell v. Hodges.	Consolidated to Obergefell v. Hodges
Australian Capital Territory	Australia	December 2013	The High Court of Australia reviewed the constitutionality of the Marriage Equality Bill approved in October by the Australian Capital Territory It declared on December 12 that same-sex marriage can only be legalised by the Federal government.	No Marriage solely a Federal Jurisdiction
Ohio	United States	December 2013	In Obergefell v. Kasich the United States District Court for the Southern District of Ohio held that it is unconstitutional not to recognize valid out-of state same-sex marriages. The decision was appealed to the United States Court of Appeals for the Sixth Circuit where it was consolidated with Henry v. Wymyslo and later consolidated with other suits form the Sixth Circuit to Obergefell v. Hodges.	Consolidated to Obergefell v. Hodges
New Mexico	United States	December 2013	In Griego v. Oliver the New Mexico Supreme Court found the then-current definition of marriage to be unconstitutional and thus legalized same-sex marriage, upholding the ruling of a lower court.	Yes
Florida	United States	January 2014	In Pareto v. Ruvin the Florida Supreme Court upheld the ruling of a lower court, mandating Miami-Dade County has to perform same-sex marriages.	Yes
Kentucky	United States	February 2014	In Bourke v. Beshear the United States District Court for the Western District of Kentucky found the denial of recognition to valid same-sex marriages unconstitutional. The decision was appealed to the United States Court of Appeals for the Sixth Circuit where it was consolidated with Love v. Beshear and later consolidated with other suits form the Sixth Circuit to Obergefell v. Hodges.	Consolidated to Obergefell v. Hodges
Florida	United States	April 2014	In Huntsman v. Heavilin the Sixteenth Judicial Circuit held that Monroe County has to perform same-sex marriages.	Yes
Ohio	United States	April 2014	In Henry v. Wymyslo the United States District Court for the Southern District of Ohio ruled that the state must recognize same-sex marriages. The decision was appealed to the United States Court of Appeals for the Sixth Circuit where it was consolidated with Obergefell v. Kasich to Obergefell v. Himes.	Consolidated to Obergefell v. Hodges
Alaska	United States	April 2014	Schmidt and Schuh v. Alaska held that same-sex couples have to be granted the same property tax exemptions.	Yes
Wisconsin	United States	May 2014	In Halopka-Ivery v. Walker a couple married in California sought to challenge Wisconsin's statute imposing criminal penalties on residents who contract in other jurisdictions a marriage that is not recognized by the state and have their marriage recognized claiming that the state's "parallel civil marriage and domestic partnership structure" denied them access to federal benefits. The Wisconsin Supreme Court declined their case one month after it was filed	Dismissed
Oregon	United States	May 2014	In Geiger v. Kitzhaber the U.S. District Court for the District of Oregon found the then-current definition of marriage to be unconstitutional and thus legalized same-sex marriage after petitions to stay the ruling were blocked by both the United States Ninth Circuit Court of Appeals and the U.S. Supreme Court.	Yes
Texas	United States	May 2014	In In the Matter of the Marriage of A.L.F.L. and K.L.L. the 45th Judicial District Court of Bexar County found the then-current definition of marriage to be unconstitutional and thus let the petition for divorce proceed.	Yes
Pennsylvania	United States	May 2014	In Whitewood v. Wolf the U.S. District Court for the Middle District of Pennsylvania found the then-current definition of marriage to be unconstitutional and thus legalized same-sex marriage.	Yes
Idaho	United States	May 2014	In Latta v. Otter the Ninth Circuit Court of Appeals upheld a previous ruling of the U.S. District Court for the District of Idaho legalizing same-sex marriage.	Yes
Kentucky	United States	July 2014	In Love v. Beshear the United States District Court for the Western District of Kentucky found the denial of recognition to valid same-sex marriages unconstitutional. The decision was appealed to the United States Court of Appeals for the Sixth Circuit where it was consolidated to Bourke v. Beshear.	Consolidated to Obergefell v. Hodges
Missouri	United States	October 2014	In Barrier v. Vasterling the Missouri Circuit Court ruled that not recognizing out-of state same-sex marriages violated the plaintiffs rights, thus recognizing such unions in the state.	Yes
Utah	United States	October 2014	In Kitchen v. Herbert the United States District Court for the District of Utah found the then-current definition of marriage to be unconstitutional and thus legalized same-sex marriage. It was later upheld by the Tenth Circuit Court of Appeals after an appeal to the U.S. Supreme Court was rejected.	Yes
Oklahoma	United States	October 2014	In Bishop v. United States the Tenth Circuit Court of Appeals complied with a District Court Ruling that found the then-current definition of marriage to be unconstitutional and thus legalized same-sex marriage after an appeal to the U.S. Supreme Court was rejected.	Yes
Colorado	United States	October 2014	In Burns v. Hickenlooper the U.S. District Court for the District of Colorado found the then-current definition of marriage to be unconstitutional and thus legalized same-sex marriage.	Yes
Colorado	United States	October 2014	In Colorado ex rel. Suthers v. Hall the Colorado Supreme Court ruled against the state of Colorado, not granting a stay to the licensing of same-sex marriage by various clerks.	Yes
Virginia	United States	October 2014	In Bostic v. Schaefer the U.S. District Court for the Eastern District of Virginia found the then-current definition of marriage to be unconstitutional and thus legalized same-sex marriage after an appeal to the U.S. Supreme Court was rejected.	Yes
North Carolina	United States	October 2014	In General Synod of the United Church of Christ v. Cooper the United States District Court for the Western District of North Carolina found the then-current definition of marriage to be unconstitutional and thus legalized same-sex marriage.	Yes
Wisconsin	United States	October 2014	In Wolf v. Walker the U.S. District Court for the Western District of Wisconsin found the then-current definition of marriage to be unconstitutional and thus legalized same-sex marriage. It was later upheld by the Seventh Circuit Court of Appeals.	Yes
Indiana	United States	October 2014	In Baskin v. Bogan the U.S. District Court for the Southern District of Indiana found the then-current definition of marriage to be unconstitutional and thus legalized same-sex marriage, reversing an earlier judgment by the U.S. District Court for the District of Nevada.	Yes
Hawaii	United States	October 2014	In Jackson v. Fuddy the Ninth Circuit Court of Appeals found that the lower court ruling upholding the same-sex marriage ban was voided by the new Marriage Equality Act, dismissing the case.	Dismissed
Florida	United States	October 2014	In Brenner v. Scott the U.S. District Court for the Northern District of Florida found the then-current definition of marriage to be unconstitutional and thus legalized same-sex marriage. It was later upheld by the Eleventh Circuit Court of Appeals.	Yes
Nevada	United States	October 2014	In Sevcik v. Sandoval the Ninth Circuit Court of Appeals found the then-current definition of marriage to be unconstitutional and thus legalized same-sex marriage. It was later upheld by the Seventh Circuit Court of Appeals.	Yes
Alaska	United States	October 2014	In Hamby v. Parnell the U.S. District Court for the District of Alaska found the then-current definition of marriage to be unconstitutional and thus legalized same-sex marriage.	Yes
Wyoming	United States	October 2014	A district court in a case in which Guzzo v. Mead, found the then-current definition of marriage to be unconstitutional and thus legalized same-sex marriage.	Yes
Arizona	United States	October 2014	The U.S. District Court for the District of Arizona in a case in which Connolly v. Roche and Majors v. Horne were united, found the then-current definition of marriage to be unconstitutional and thus legalized same-sex marriage.	Yes
West Virginia	United States	November 2014	In McGee v. Cole the United States District Court for the Southern District of West Virginia found the then-current definition of marriage to be unconstitutional and thus legalized same-sex marriage.	Yes
Kansas	United States	November 2014	In Schmidt v. Moriarty the Kansas Supreme Court found that a judge licensing same-sex marriage did act within his jurisdiction, it did not rule about the issue of same-sex marriage by itself	Yes
Missouri	United States	November 2014	In State of Missouri v. Florida the St. Louis Circuit Court found the then-current definition of marriage to be unconstitutional and thus legalized same-sex marriage in St. Louis County.	Yes
Utah	United States	November 2014	In McGee v. Cole the United States District Court for the District of Utah ordered the state to permanently licence same-sex marriages and dismissed a permanent stay to a previous court ruling. It was issued after the Tenth Circuit Court of Appeals and the U.S. Supreme Court refused to issue stays extending to more than October 2014.	Yes
South Carolina	United States	November 2014	In Bradacs v. Haley the United States District Court for the District of South Carolina upheld the validity of same-sex marriages performed abroad or in other states.	Yes
South Carolina	United States	November 2014	In Condon v. Haley the United States District Court for the District of South Carolina found the then-current definition of marriage to be unconstitutional and thus legalized same-sex marriage.	Yes
(Georgia (U.S. state)) Georgia	United States	January 2015	The U.S. District Court for the Northern District of Georgia suspended proceeding due to the pending decision of Obergefell v. Hodges in the U.S. Supreme Court.	Suspended
Alabama	United States	March 2015	The Alabama Policy Institute and the Alabama Citizens Action Programm filed a lawsuit asking the Alabama Supreme Court to order the state's probate judges to deny marriage licenses to same-sex couples in the Alabama Supreme Court, which found the current same-sex marriage ban did not violate the U.S. constitution, thus barring any same-sex marriages in the state.	No
Arkansas	United States	June 2015	In Wright v. Arkansas the Supreme Court of Arkansas dismissed an appeal to the ruling of a lower court legalizing same-sex marriage until the ruling was stayed as moot after Obergefell v. Hodges.	Dismissed
Missouri	United States	June 2015	In Lawson v. Kelly the Jackson County Circuit Court found the then-current definition of marriage to be unconstitutional and thus legalized same-sex marriage, but the decision was stayed pending an appeal to the Eighth Circuit Court of Appeals, which lifted the stay complying with Obergefell v. Hodges.	Yes
Guam	United States	June 2015	The District Court of Guam ruled that officials have to perform same-sex marriages.	Yes
Nebraska	United States	July 2015	In Waters v. Ricketts the Eighth Circuit Court of Appeals reaffirmed a lower courts ruling, lifting the stay on the decision and granting a general injunction, thus legalizing same-sex marriage in the state.	Yes
Louisiana	United States	July 2015	In Robicheaux v. George the Fifth Circuit Court of Appeals ordered the state to recognize and register out-of state same-sex marriages, thus complying with Obergefell v. Hodges.	Yes
Mississippi	United States	July 2015	In Campaign for Southern Equality v. Bryant the Fifth Circuit Court of Appeals lifted the stay on a lower courts ruling, thus legalizing same-sex marriage in the state.	Yes
Texas	United States	July 2015	In Texas v. Naylor the Supreme Court of Texas upheld a lower courts ruling to grant divorce to a same-sex marriage that has never been recognized in Texas, denying the state a right to intervene..	Yes
Texas	United States	July 2015	The Fifth Circuit Court of Appeals in the case De Leon v. Perry, amanded a lower court decision just ordering review of the statute banning same-sex marriage, complying with Obergefell v. Hodges.	Yes
Louisiana	United States	July 2015	The Louisiana Supreme Court in the case Costanza v. Caldwell dismissed an appeal by the state, lifting the stay on a lower which subsequently declared the same-sex marriage ban unlawfull, complying with Obergefell v. Hodges.	Yes
Puerto Rico	United States	July 2015	The First Circuit Court of Appeals in the case Conde-Vidal v. Garcia-Padilla, overturned the ban on same-sex marriage.	Yes
South Dakota	United States	July 2015	The Eighth Circuit Court of Appeals in the case Rosenbrahn v. Daugaard, reaffirmed the ruling of U.S. District Court for the District of South Dakota ruled the current ban on same-sex marriage violated fundamental rights, complying with Obergefell v. Hodges.	Yes
Kansas	United States	August 2015	The Tenth Circuit Court of Appeals issued an order declaring that "Article 15, § 16 of the Kansas Constitution, ... and any other Kansas statute, law, policy, or practice that prohibits issuing marriage licenses to same-sex couples in Kansas or recognizing such marriages on the same terms and conditions that apply to opposite-sex couples contravene the Fourteenth Amendment to the United States Constitution.	Yes
Mississippi	United States	December 2015	In Czekala-Chatham v. Melancon the Mississippi Supreme Court granted divorce to a same-sex couple which was never recognized under state law, complying with Obergefell v. Hodges.	Yes
Jalisco	Mexico	January 2016	The Supreme Court of Justice ruled that the current definition of marriage was discriminatory and thus unconstitutional, thereby legalizing same-sex marriage in the state.	Yes
Virginia	United States	April 2016	The Supreme Court of Virginia held that cohabitation laws also apply to same-sex couples.	Yes
Texas	United States	April 2016	In cases from Travis County the Supreme Court of Texas dismissed efforts to let common-law same-sex marriages be voided.	Dismissed
Alabama	United States	April 2016	In Hard v. Strange the Eleventh Circuit Court of Appeals upheld a lower courts ruling amending a death certificate to include the marriage previously concluded in Massachusetts.	Yes
Alabama	United States	June 2016	In Searcy v. Strange and Strawser v. Strange the United States District Court for the Southern District of Alabama issued a permanent injunction barring any state official from enforcing laws that fail to recognize same-sex couples' right to marry.	Yes
Bermuda	(United Kingdom) UK	May 2017	A gay Bermudian and his fiancé have been granted leave to argue in the Supreme Court that they should be allowed to wed on the island. On 5 May 2017 the ban on gay marriage within Bermuda was declared unconstitutional by a unanimous decision within the Supreme Court of Bermuda. The Bermuda Government responded with a domestic partnership law in February 2018.	Yes
Chiapas	Mexico	July 2017	An act of unconstitutionality was filed in April 2016 against the Civil Code of the state. The Supreme Court of Justice then ruled that the current definition of marriage was discriminatory and thus unconstitutional, thereby legalizing same-sex marriage in the state.	Yes
Puebla	Mexico	August 2017	An act of unconstitutionality was filed in April 2016 against the Civil Code of the state. The Supreme Court of Justice then ruled that articles 294 and 300 of the Civil Code were discriminatory and thus unconstitutional, thereby legalizing same-sex marriage in the state.	Yes
Hong Kong	China	July 2018	The Court of Appeal ruled that same-sex spouses have to be granted spousal visa equally to heterosexual partners.	Yes
Nuevo León	Mexico	February 2019	An act of unconstitutionality was filed in February 2018 against the Civil Code of the state. The Supreme Court of Justice then ruled that articles 140 and 148 of the Civil Code were discriminatory and thus unconstitutional, thereby legalizing same-sex marriage in the state.	Yes
Aguascalientes	Mexico	April 2019	The Supreme Court of Justice ruled that articles 143, 144 and 113 of the Civil Code were discriminatory and thus unconstitutional, thereby legalizing same-sex marriage in the state.	Yes
Hong Kong	China	June 2019	The court found that denying spousal benefits to same-sex couples married abroad is not in accordance with the Basic Law.	Yes
Hong Kong	China	October 2019	In August 2018 the High Court heard a case seeking to recognise civil partnerships in a preliminary hearing, and it is expected to be heard in the first half of 2019. The Court then dismissed the case, as it found it was not for the courts to solve.	Dismissed
Hong Kong	China	September 2020	In January 2019 the High Court agreed to hear a challenge to the city's refusal to recognise same-sex marriage, argueing that the inability of same-sex couples to get married violated their right to equality under the city's Bill of Rights and the Basic Law. The case got rejected as "too ambitious".	No
Cayman Islands	(United Kingdom) UK	December 2020	The Immigration Appeals Tribunal ruled that the Irish same-sex marriage of a permanent resident has to be recognized for the purpose of granting the husband the status of spouse of a permanent resident. It held that differentiating between same-sex and opposite-sex marriages would be unconstitutional.	Yes
Northern Ireland	(United Kingdom) UK	Case Moot	A case heard by the Court of Appeal on 16 March 2018 by an anonymous couple seeking to convert their Civil Union into marriage. Meanwhile, in December 2020, the Northern Ireland Assembly legalized such conversions.	Further proceedings?
Bermuda	(United Kingdom) UK	March 2022	The Domestic Partnership Act 2018 replacing equal marriage was found discriminatory and unconstitutional by the Supreme Court in June 2018, but the ruling was stayed for an appeal by the Government. The Court of Appeal in November 2018 rejected the appeal thus relegalizing same-sex marriage in Bermuda. The Government has filed an appeal to the Privy Council, however, the ruling of the Court of Appeal is not stayed. The Privy Council heard the case on 3 and 4 of February 2021. On 14 March 2022, the Privy Council overturned the ruling of the Court of Appeal and ruled that legislation banning same-sex marriage in Bermuda was not unconstitutional.	No
Cayman Islands	(United Kingdom) UK	March 2022	In April 2018 a lawsuit against the statutory same-sex marriage ban was filed in the Grand Court. The hearing took place in February 2019. The court than ruled the current definition of marriage unconstitutional. The ruling was appealed by the government, and stayed. The Court of Appeal reversed the ruling of the Grand Court, stating that it relied too much on court rulings not being relevant for the case and thus again banning same-sex marriage on the island. Nonetheless, the Court of Appeal noted that some kind of recognition has to be granted, and that the government of the UK must step in, given that no Civil Unions are implemented. The Privy Council heard the case on 23 and 24 February 2021. On 14 March 2022, the Privy Council ruled that the Constitution did not provide right for same-sex marriage.	No
Veracruz	Mexico	May 2022	In August 2020 the National Human Rights Commission filed a case of unconstitutionality against the Civil Code of the state. The court ruled the articles in question to be void.	Yes
Hong Kong	China	September 2023	In Sham Tsz Kit v Secretary for Justice the Hong Kong Court of Final Appeal directed the government to establish an alternative framework for the legal recognition of same-sex relationships, with equivalent rights and obligations to marriage, within two years of the ruling. However, the court also ruled that same-sex couples do not have a constitutionally guaranteed right to marry.	Yes / No
Curaçao and Aruba	Netherlands	July 2024	In September 2021, the Court of First Instance found that the exclusion of same-sex couples from marriage in Curaçao was contrary to the equality principle in the constitution, but left it to the legislature to address the unlawful discrimination. In December 2022, the Joint Court of Justice of Aruba, Curaçao, and Sint Maarten ruled that the ban on same-sex marriage in Aruba and Curaçao was unlawful discrimination and that same-sex couples must be allowed to marry in those islands. The Supreme Court of the Netherlands upheld the previous ruling. Furthermore, it supported the view of the Joint Court of Justice that no legislative action is needed for same-sex marriage to be available in Aruba and Curaçao.	Yes
(British Virgin Islands) Virgin Islands	(United Kingdom) UK	Pending	A Virgin Islands couple who were married in the UK filed suit in 2021 seeking local recognition of their marriage. The case is set to be heard at the Eastern Caribbean Supreme Court in September 2022.	

== Codification of same-sex marriage rulings ==
Codification is the process of turning a legal rule that exists only because of a court decision into a written law included in a country’s official statutes. A future court can, in theory, overturn an earlier decision, as demonstrated by Roe v. Wade in the United States. By contrast, legislation passed by parliament is generally more difficult to repeal and provide greater legal certainty. Codifying a decision enables governments to update related systems, such as tax documentation, inheritance laws, and adoption procedures. Instead of lawyers digging through past court decisions, anyone can look at laws like the Marriage Act or Civil Code and understand their rights in clear, written form.

#	Country	Date of ruling	Date effective	Legalization method	Codification status	Notes
1	South Africa	1 December 2005	30 November 2006	Passed by the Parliament of South Africa after ruling of the Constitutional Court of South Africa	Yes / No incomplete	(Note: If Parliament missed the Constitutional Court's deadline of 1 December 2006, words would be "read in" to the Marriage Act to allow same-sex marriages to take place. Justice Kate O'Regan dissented, arguing that these words should be read in immediately. The original bill only allowed for civil unions between same-sex partners. The Joint Working Group, a network of LGBT organisations, described the idea of a separate marriage law for same-sex couples as "an apartheid way of thinking". Subsequently, the bill was amended by the Portfolio Committee of Home Affairs to allow both marriages and civil partnerships. After the passage of Civil Union Act, Minister of Home Affairs Nosiviwe Mapisa-Nqakula stated that the law was merely a temporary solution, explaining that a more comprehensive marriage law would be created to unify the various pieces of marriage legislation currently in effect. The Act originally allowed secular marriage officers to be exempted from performing same-sex marriages on the grounds of conscience, religion or belief. This provision was repealed in October 2020 by the Civil Union Amendment Act, 2020, with exemptions expiring after a two-year transition period. In October 2020, the Department of Home Affairs confirmed plans to introduce a new draft marriage policy, reconciling the diverse marriage laws into a single piece of legislation. The bill was tabled in Parliament in December 2023.)
2	Brazil	14 May 2013	16 May 2013	Ruling of the National Justice Council	No	(Note: Marriage is legal following a National Council of Justice ruling; however, Congress has yet to pass a law and update the marriage statutes. In March 2017, the Constitution and Justice Commission of the Brazilian Senate preliminarily approved a bill to align the Civil Code with the National Justice Council's ruling. However, it was not advanced by either the Senate or the Chamber of Deputies prior to the 2018 elections. On 13 November 2024, the Human Rights Committee of the Chamber of Deputies approved a bill to codify same-sex marriage into federal civil law.)
3	United States	26 June 2015	26 June 2015	Ruling of the Supreme Court of the United States	Yes / No incomplete / state-by-state	(Note: Congress passed the Respect for Marriage Act in late 2022. However, this law doesn't force states to perform marriages if the court ruling is ever overturned, but it requires the federal government and all states to recognize valid marriages performed elsewhere. Some states such as California and Nevada moved to fully codify same-sex marriage into their constitutions.)
4	Colombia	28 April 2016	28 April 2016	Ruling of the Constitutional Court of Colombia	No	(Note: Marriage is legal following a Constitutional Court ruling; however, Congress has yet to pass a law and update the marriage statutes.)
5	Austria	4 December 2017	1 January 2019	Ruling of the Constitutional Court of Austria	No	(Note: Marriage is legal following a Constitutional Court ruling; however, Parliament has yet to pass a law and update the marriage statutes, failing to comply with the court's deadline.)
6	Taiwan	24 May 2017	24 May 2019	Passed by the Legislative Yuan after ruling of the Constitutional Court of Taiwan	Yes / No incomplete	(Note: In November 2018, the Taiwanese electorate rejected same-sex marriage. In response, the government confirmed it would not amend the Civil Code but would instead prepare a separate law for same-sex couples. On 17 May 2019, just days before the court's deadline, a bill was passed that would allow same-sex couples to establish a "permanent union of intimate and exclusive nature for the purpose of living a common life." The Taiwanese Civil Code defines marriage as a union between a man and a woman, and still contains many gender-specific terms like "husband and wife".)
7	Ecuador	12 June 2019	8 July 2019	Ruling of the Constitutional Court of Ecuador	No	(Note: Marriage is legal following a Constitutional Court ruling; however, Parliament has yet to pass a law and update the marriage statutes.)
8	Costa Rica	8 August 2018	26 May 2020	Ruling of the Supreme Court of Costa Rica	No	(Note: Marriage is legal following a Supreme Court ruling; however, Parliament has yet to pass a law and update the marriage statutes, failing to comply with the court's deadline. On May 12, 2020, a motion requesting that the Supreme Court postpone the application of the ruling to allow more time to legislate due to the COVID-19 pandemic, signed by 26 deputies, was presented to the President of the Legislative Assembly. On May 19, the Assembly rejected a proposition to put the motion at the top of the Assembly's agenda, with 33 votes against and 20 in favor. The Supreme Court ruled in June 2020 that judges appointed prior to the legalisation of same-sex marriage can refuse to preside over such a marriage, provided they have notified the Superior Council of the Judiciary and a replacement judge has been found. Judges appointed since the legalisation of same-sex marriage cannot refuse to solemnize the marriage.)
9	Slovenia	16 June 2022	9 July 2022	Ruling of the Constitutional Court of Slovenia	Yes (since 31 January 2023)	(Note: The National Assembly passed the bill on 4 October 2022 in a 48–29 vote. On 11 October 2022, the bill was given a suspensory veto by the National Council by a vote of 17 to 11, requiring another vote in the National Assembly. That same day, representatives of the Coalition for Children submitted some 30,600 signatures to the National Assembly to start the process of a conducting a referendum on the vetoed legislation. It was announced on 14 October that there would be an extraordinary legislative session in the Assembly on 18 October, to re-vote on the vetoed legislation. The Assembly passed the bill by a final vote of 51–24. On 28 October 2022, the National Assembly approved a resolution by 45 votes to 27 with 2 abstentions, deeming a proposed referendum on changes to the Family Code inadmissible. The bill was signed into law by President Borut Pahor, and published in the Official Gazette of the Republic of Slovenia on 28 October. Opponents of the legislation were informed that they had 15 days from the publication date to contest the decision to the Constitutional Court (i.e. until 12 November), which they did within that time period. On 11 January 2023, the Constitutional Court upheld the decision of the National Assembly to declare the referendum inadmissible. The law was published once more in the Official Gazette on 16 January 2023, and took effect 15 days later (i.e. 31 January 2023).)
10	Mexico	12 June 2015		Ruling of the Supreme Court of Justice of the Nation, and laws enacted in several states.	Yes / No incomplete / state-by-state	(Note: Each of Mexico's 32 federal entities (states) gradually legalized it, with Mexico City being the first in 2010.)

== See also ==
- Same-sex union legislation
