= Kefilwe Monosi =

Motswana photographer

- Occupation: Photographer
- Awards: Prince Claus Fund SEED Award (2021)

Kefilwe "Fifi" Monosi is a Motswana photographer. She is known for her work addressing societal taboos and advocating for marginalised communities living in her native Botswana.

== Early life and education ==
Monosi is based in Gaborone, Botswana. She has an undergraduate degree in mass communication.

== Career ==
Monosi has been described as a documentary photographer whose work explores issues widely considered as taboo in Tswana society, including sex work, the LGBTQ community, gender-related violence, mental health, menstruation, abortion, and climate change.

In 2016, in collaboration with the non-governmental organisation Kagisano Society and with sponsorship from the Botswana European Corporation within the Ministry of Finance, Monosi curated See What I See. Displayed across Gaborone, including at Main Mall, Rail Park Mall, and African Mall, it comprises 16 photos to commemorate 16 Days of Activism against Gender-based Violence, an annual campaign by the United Nations.

The following year, in collaboration with the Botswana Association of Psychosocial Rehabilitation Centre, Monosi displayed Faces of Depression, documenting people's experiences of mental illness in Botswana, using models to portray anonymous patients and people.

Other exhibitions by Monosi include Fotografia Etica, which was displayed in Italy in 2023, and The Other Hundred, which premiered in Hong Kong in 2021.

Monosi became known for a series of photographs she took of transgender activists living and working in Botswana. The scope of work expanded to include other members of the LGBTQ community, with Monosi stating her intention to document "LGBTQ stories of resilience". In 2026, she photographed activists Bonolo Selelo and Tsholofelo Kumile, who sought to legalise same sex marriage in Botswana, for the British newspaper The Guardian.

In 2026, Monosi produced the documentary film 58 Years Later: Voices of Today Botswana, co-directed by Ras Mutabaruka and Robert Asimba. The film follows candidates in the 2024 Botswana general election, which saw the end of 58 years of single-party rule by the Botswana Democratic Party.

== Recognition ==
Monosi won the 2021 SEED Award from the Prince Claus Fund for her "promotion of queer expression through her photography". That same year, she received the Constructive Journalism Fellowship from Deutsche Welle Akademie.

In 2023, Monosi received the Vital Impacts Mentorship Program. In 2025, she received the Reimagining African Narratives Photography Fellowship from NEWF.
