= Selelo v Acting Director of Civil Registration =

Pending Botswana High Court case concerning same-sex marriage

- Court: High Court of Botswana
- Full case name: Selelo and Others v Acting Director of Civil Registration and Others
- Docket nos.: MAHGB-000728-25

Court membership
- Judges sitting: Ketlogetswe CJ; Nthomiwa JP; Dube J; Gabanagae J; Maripe J

Keywords
- Constitutional law; Judicial review; Same-sex marriage; Statutory interpretation

Selelo v Acting Director of Civil Registration is a pending case before the High Court of Botswana concerning the recognition of same-sex marriage in Botswana.

Bonolo Selelo and Tsholofelo Kumile initiated the proceedings in 2025 after the Department of Civil and National Registration refused to publish banns of marriage for their intended civil marriage. The applicants seek to have the refusal set aside and contend that the Marriage Act, 2001 can be interpreted to permit their marriage. In the alternative, they ask the court to declare section 10(2) of the Act unconstitutional insofar as it excludes same-sex couples.

The government opposes the application, maintaining that the Act contemplates marriage between a man and a woman and that the registration authorities acted lawfully. The dispute concerns both the interpretation of gender-specific terms in marriage legislation and the application of constitutional guarantees, including the exception concerning personal law in section 15(4)(c) of the Constitution of Botswana.

On 4 September 2026, the High Court admitted Lesbians, Gays and Bisexuals of Botswana (LEGABIBO) as a third applicant, three religious and cultural organisations as additional respondents, and a legal academic as an amicus curiae. A five-judge bench heard the main application on 22 and 23 October 2026 and adjourned after the parties' submissions. Judgment of the case is set to be delivered on 2 April 2027.

== Background ==
=== Legal background ===
The Marriage Act, 2001 (Act 18 of 2001; Cap. 29:01) came into force on 28 December 2001. Part I regulates civil marriages solemnised in Botswana, excluding marriages contracted under customary law or Muslim, Hindu or other religious rites; Part II concerns the registration of those other marriages. Section 3 requires either advance publication of banns under section 4 or a special licence under section 5. Banns may be publicly announced during services at a place of worship or displayed at an administrative officer's office over three successive weeks.

Section 7 permits administrative officers and suitably appointed religious ministers to act as marriage officers. Under section 10(1), a minister of religion solemnising a marriage follows the formulary of the congregation. Section 10(2) prescribes the words to be used by an administrative officer solemnising a marriage and refers to the parties as a "bridegroom" and a "bride", and to their becoming "husband" or "wife". The Act does not contain an express definition of marriage as a union between a man and a woman, but the parties disagree about the legal significance of its terminology.

Section 44(1) of Botswana's Interpretation Act provides that words denoting the male sex in an enactment also include the female sex, and vice versa. Section 2 makes the Act's interpretative rules applicable to enactments unless a contrary intention appears. Whether this general interpretative provision can be applied to the wording of the Marriage Act is among the questions raised by the applicants.

The applicants invoke sections 3, 7, 12, 13 and 15 of the Constitution, addressing fundamental rights and freedoms, protection from inhuman treatment, freedom of expression, freedom of assembly and association, and protection from discrimination. Section 15(1) prohibits discriminatory legislation, while section 15(2) regulates discriminatory treatment by public officials and authorities. Section 15(4)(c) expressly excludes laws concerning marriage and other specified matters of personal law from the application of subsection (1). The parties dispute the effect of that exception on the present challenge. The litigation follows several decisions concerning the rights of LGBTQ people in Botswana. In Attorney General v Rammoge, the Court of Appeal upheld the right of LEGABIBO to register as a society. In Motshidiemang v Attorney General, the High Court held in June 2019 that statutory offences used to criminalise consensual same-sex sexual conduct were unconstitutional. On 29 November 2021, the Court of Appeal dismissed the government's appeal while modifying the High Court's order to strike down sections 164(a) and 164(c) of the Penal Code.

=== Applicants and refusal to publish banns ===
Selelo is a lawyer who operates B. O. Selelo Attorneys, where Kumile has also worked. The couple met at a Pride event in Gaborone on 1 October 2023 and moved in together later that year. Selelo proposed to Kumile during the Easter holiday in 2024. In interviews, Selelo said their reasons for marrying included ensuring greater legal protection for Kumile if Selelo died. On 15 April 2025, the couple attended the Department of Civil and National Registration's marriage office in Gaborone, accompanied by two witnesses, to arrange publication of their banns. They were referred to senior officials. According to their affidavits, they were informed that the law did not permit a marriage between two women and were advised to consider marrying in South Africa, which has recognised same-sex marriage since 2006.

The department confirmed its refusal by letter dated 8 May 2025, stating that marriage in the manner the couple sought was not supported by the law. The applicants challenged both that administrative decision and, depending on the interpretation adopted by the court, the relevant provisions of the Marriage Act.

== Proceedings ==
=== Institution of proceedings and remedies sought ===
Selelo and Kumile commenced proceedings against the Acting Director of Civil Registration and the Attorney General on 1 September 2025. An amended notice of motion and founding affidavit were filed on 7 October 2025, and the Acting Director's answering affidavit was filed in November. The proceedings combine an application for judicial review with alternative constitutional claims. The case advances two groups of requested orders. Under the first, the applicants seek review and reversal of the 8 May 2025 decision, or a declaration that the refusal itself violates constitutional rights, followed by an order requiring publication of their banns. Under the second, they seek a declaration that section 10(2), properly interpreted, permits same-sex marriage; alternatively, that any exclusion imposed by the section is unconstitutional and must be struck down. They also seek consequential orders concerning the solemnisation and registration of their marriage.

=== Applications to intervene ===
Religious and cultural organisations sought to enter the proceedings on the government's side in March 2026. They were the Botswana House of Prayer and Transformation, the Dingwetsi Association of Botswana and the Evangelical Fellowship of Botswana (EFB). LEGABIBO separately applied to be joined in support of the original applicants, while Onthatile Olerile Moeti, a legal academic at the University of Botswana, applied to participate as an amicus curiae (friend of the court).

The joinder applications were initially expected to be heard on 8 June 2026, but the hearing was postponed because papers for the opposing interveners were outstanding. The court considered the applications on 14 July and reserved its ruling. The parties to the original case did not oppose the proposed interventions.

On 4 September 2026, the five-judge High Court bench granted all five applications. LEGABIBO became the third applicant; the House of Prayer and Transformation, Dingwetsi Association and EFB became the third, fourth and fifth respondents respectively; and Moeti was admitted as amicus curiae. The ruling determined only the status of additional participants and did not decide the legality or constitutionality of the exclusion of same-sex couples from civil marriage.

In assessing the applications, the court considered whether prospective interveners had a direct and substantial legal interest in the outcome. It accepted LEGABIBO's position that an eventual judgment would affect the legal position of the same-sex couples it represents. The court also accepted the religious and cultural organisations' submissions that the relief sought could affect matters within their stated objectives, including marriage counselling, family practices and the role of church ministers legally authorised to solemnise marriages. The EFB relied in particular on the position of its members who are registered marriage officers. Those findings concerned the threshold for participation, rather than the merits of the interveners' objections.

=== Substantive hearing ===
The five-judge bench heard the main application at the High Court in Gaborone on Thursday 22 and Friday 23 October 2026. During the first day's proceedings, advocate Wim Trengove, appearing for Selelo and Kumile, argued that the text of the Marriage Act does not expressly confine marriage to opposite-sex couples and that excluding same-sex couples would infringe constitutional rights. Mboki Chilisa, appearing for the state, argued that the legislation was not intended to authorise same-sex marriage and rejected the applicants' proposed interpretation of the statutory language.

On 23 October, the court heard further submissions from other respondents and responses to the arguments presented by opposing parties. In its account of the hearing, LEGABIBO said the respondents had relied largely on Christian doctrine to defend marriage as an opposite-sex institution, while the applicants had emphasised constitutional guarantees and differences in the legal protection available to married opposite-sex couples and unmarried same-sex couples. This was the third applicant's characterisation of the submissions, not a finding by the court.

At the conclusion of the hearing, the court adjourned without delivering judgment and judgment will be delivered on 2 April 2027.

== Legal arguments ==
=== Applicants ===
==== Interpretation of the Marriage Act ====
The original applicants distinguish the legal procedure for publishing banns from the later solemnisation of a marriage. Selelo contends that the sections of the Act governing banns do not refer specifically to opposite-sex couples and that a prohibition on their proposed marriage should not be inferred from the wording of the later ceremonial formula. She also argues that section 13, which addresses impediments to marriage, does not expressly list a marriage between persons of the same sex.

The applicants further rely on the Interpretation Act rule that statutory references to one sex include the other. On their construction, references to a bride or bridegroom and husband or wife in section 10(2) can be read inclusively, particularly when the Marriage Act is construed consistently with constitutional rights. They contend that an interpretation permitting their marriage would avoid the need to strike down legislation; the constitutional challenge to section 10(2) is advanced in the alternative.

==== Constitutional claims ====
The applicants argue that denying them access to the civil institution of marriage infringes their rights under sections 3, 7, 12, 13 and 15 of the Constitution. They contend that the exclusion affects dignity, equal protection, freedom of expression and association, and their ability to obtain the legal protections available to spouses, including those relating to property, inheritance and decisions concerning a partner's welfare. These alleged consequences form part of their case rather than judicial findings.

The applicants also contend that the exception in section 15(4)(c) must be interpreted in light of the constitutional guarantee of fundamental rights in section 3, rather than as an unlimited exemption for discriminatory rules concerning marriage. In their replying papers, they invoked Motshidiemang, arguing that the constitutional protection accorded to sexual minorities in that case was relevant to the present exclusion from marriage.

=== Government ===
The government argues that the Marriage Act envisages only marriage between a man and a woman. In its view, the Act's references to a "bridegroom", "bride", "husband" and "wife" reflect a deliberately opposite-sex statutory framework; a marriage officer cannot solemnise a union excluded by that framework, and publication of banns for such a marriage would accordingly be inappropriate. In the answering affidavit, Acting Director Ofentse Gojamang defended the refusal as lawful and consistent with the legislation.

On the constitutional challenge, the government relies on section 15(4)(c), under which section 15(1)'s restriction on discriminatory legislation does not apply to laws concerning marriage and specified other matters of personal law. It maintains that the applicants have not established violations of their other constitutional rights, including the protections against inhuman treatment and interference with expression or association. It also argues that an expansion of marriage law to include same-sex couples is a matter for the legislature, rather than an interpretation that can be imposed on the existing text.

In April 2026, while the litigation was pending, the Minister of Labour and Home Affairs, Pius Mokgware, stated in Parliament that the government was reviewing the marriage legislation. His statement concerned the legislative review rather than a concession of the applicants' legal case.

The parties have also disputed the status of advice supplied by the Attorney General before the refusal to publish the banns. The government asserted legal professional privilege over the advice. The applicants replied that material underlying the challenged administrative decision should have formed part of the record disclosed in the review proceedings.

=== Other participants ===
LEGABIBO argues that the case concerns more than the two original applicants because excluding same-sex couples from marriage affects a wider class of people whom it represents. It contends that the exclusion denies same-sex couples a publicly recognised legal status and the protections relating to property, maintenance, succession, family relationships and next-of-kin decision-making commonly associated with civil marriage. Its submissions rely on constitutional protections for sexual minorities developed in earlier case law.

The House of Prayer and Transformation and Dingwetsi Association maintain that recognising same-sex marriages would affect family law, customary traditions and the institution of marriage. Their submissions have argued that changes with such consequences ought to be addressed through the legislative process, including the constitutionally prescribed participation of Ntlo ya Dikgosi where applicable. The EFB, an umbrella organisation comprising dozens of evangelical churches, opposes same-sex marriage on religious grounds. It also argues that the position of ministers of religion appointed as marriage officers gives it a legal interest in the Act's interpretation.

Moeti was admitted as a friend of the court to provide legal and comparative analysis. Her participation is distinct from joinder as an applicant or respondent, and the September ruling did not decide the eventual merits of any arguments submitted by the amicus.

== Public response ==
The proceedings have generated public debate and attracted participation by LGBTQ-rights organisations, churches and groups campaigning for the preservation of traditional marriage. Selelo compared opposition to the couple's intended marriage with the resistance encountered by Seretse Khama and Ruth Williams Khama when they married in 1948.

In interviews with The Guardian, Dingwetsi founder Grace Silver defended the organisation's participation as a means of protecting Setswana cultural practices; a representative of the House of Prayer and Transformation expressed opposition in religious terms. LGBTQ-rights advocates, including Tshepo Ricki Kgositau, countered that Christian and cultural traditions could be understood in ways consistent with protection of minority rights.

LEGABIBO has accompanied the litigation with its Lorato Ke Lorato ("lit. Love Is Love") awareness campaign.

== See also ==
- Recognition of same-sex unions in Botswana
- LGBTQ rights in Botswana
- Recognition of same-sex unions in Africa
- Minister of Home Affairs v Fourie

== Bibliography ==
=== Legislation and court documents ===
- Constitute (2016). "Botswana's Constitution of 1966 with Amendments through 2016". Constitute.
- High Court of Botswana (4 September 2026). "Ruling on the applications for joinder in Selelo and Others v Acting Director of Civil Registration and Others". Studocu.
- Court of Appeal of Botswana (29 November 2021). "Attorney General v Letsweletse Motshidiemang (CACGB-157-19): Judgment" (PDF) – via ALT Advisory.
- Republic of Botswana (1984). "Interpretation Act (Cap. 01:04), as amended". Botswana Laws.
- Republic of Botswana (2001). "Marriage Act, 2001 (Act 18 of 2001; Cap. 29:01)". Botswana Laws.
- B. O. Selelo Attorneys (23 January 2026). "Selelo and Kumile v Acting Director of Civil Registration and Attorney General: Paginated bundle of pleadings". Internet Archive.

=== Reportage ===
- Adamson, Kabelo (21 July 2026). "Same-sex marriage battle intensifies as church groups intervene". News & All Botswana.
- Agence France-Presse (15 July 2026). "Botswana bid to legalise same-sex marriage draws church, cultural opposition". eNCA.
- Attorney General's Chambers (23 October 2026). "High Court continues to hear constitutional challenge to Marriage Act". Facebook.
- Christian Daily International (22 July 2026). "Botswana's Evangelical Fellowship applies to join landmark same-sex marriage case". Christian Daily International.
- De Barros, Luiz (7 March 2026). "Botswana Same-Sex Couple Fights for Right to Marry in Historic Court Case". MambaOnline.
- De Barros, Luiz (5 September 2026). "Historic Botswana Same-Sex Marriage Case Moves Forward as More Parties Join". MambaOnline.
- LEGABIBO (23 October 2026). "Court adjourned. The fight for equality continues". Facebook.
- Malabe, Chawada (21 July 2026). "Churches and LGBTQ face off". The Voice.
- Malunga, Bongani (13 April 2026). "Govt Reviews Same Sex Marriage Law". Botswana Gazette.
- Masolotate, Bonang (9 March 2026). "Same-sex couple challenges Marriage Act". Daily News. Botswana Press Agency.
- Mokwape, Mpho (15 June 2026). "LEGABIBO says same-sex marriage exclusion is unconstitutional". Mmegi.
- Savage, Rachel (25 May 2026). "'She does not back down': the couple seeking to legalise same-sex marriage in Botswana". The Guardian.
- Southern Africa Litigation Centre (19 October 2026). "Botswana: Affirming the right of same sex couples to get married". Southern Africa Litigation Centre.
