= Same-sex marriage in Oaxaca =

Same-sex marriage has been legal in Oaxaca since 26 August 2018, when the state civil registry announced it would process marriage applications from same-sex couples in line with jurisprudence established by the Supreme Court of Justice of the Nation. However, the couples required additional red tape compared to opposite-sex partners. Oaxaca was the thirteenth Mexican state to legalize same-sex marriage. A landmark 2012 Supreme Court order for Oaxaca had established the right to marriage by amparo across Mexico. On 28 August 2019, the Congress of Oaxaca passed legislation amending the Civil Code to recognise same-sex marriages. The law was signed by Governor Alejandro Murat Hinojosa, and went into force on 5 October 2019.

== Legal history ==
=== 2012 Supreme Court case ===
In August 2011, three same-sex couples, four women and two men, applied to marry in Oaxaca City but were rejected by local officials. They filed an amparo, which was denied on 31 January, and subsequently appealed to the Collegiate Courts in Civil and Administrative Matters for Oaxaca. On 9 April 2012, one of the lesbian couples obtained permission by a judge to marry, marking the first such approval in the state. The ruling was appealed, and on 5 December 2012, the Supreme Court of Justice of the Nation overturned the lower court decision in favor of all three couples. Despite this ruling, local authorities continued to refuse to perform the marriages. The couples returned to the Supreme Court, which reaffirmed their rights. The first lesbian couple received authorization to marry from the civil registry on 25 February 2013, and married on 22 March 2013. The male couple received their authorization on 3 June 2013, and the third couple two days later.

On 26 August 2012, a federal judge ordered the state to perform same-sex marriages based on the Constitution of Mexico, which bans discrimination on the grounds of sexual orientation. This ruling, along with two similar amparo cases, was reviewed by the Supreme Court, which issued a unanimous ruling on 5 December 2012 overturning the ban on same-sex marriage. However, under Mexican jurisprudence, five identical rulings are required to establish binding precedent. The Oaxaca case became pivotal in expanding access to same-sex marriage nationwide through the recurso de amparo remedy. Drawing on international jurisprudence—including Atala Riffo and Daughters v. Chile, as well as the U.S. cases of Loving v. Virginia and Brown v. Board of Education—and Mexico's own anti-discrimination laws, the Supreme Court concluded that laws restricting marriage to "one man and one woman", or limiting it to procreation, violate federal guarantees of equality and non-discrimination. The court held that such laws infringe upon not only the individual right to marry, but also the couple's right to form a family. The court based its ruling on Articles 1 and 4 of the Constitution of Mexico. Article 1 of the Constitution states:

Any form of discrimination, based on ethnic or national origin, gender, age, disabilities, social status, medical conditions, religion, opinions, sexual orientation, marital status, or any other form, which violates the human dignity or seeks to annul or diminish the rights and freedoms of the people, is prohibited. (Note: In some official and indigenous languages of Oaxaca: Spanish: Queda prohibida toda discriminación motivada por origen étnico o nacional, el género, la edad, las discapacidades, la condición social, las condiciones de salud, la religión, las opiniones, las preferencias sexuales, el estado civil o cualquier otra que atente contra la dignidad humana y tenga por objeto anular o menoscabar los derechos y libertades de las personas.; Mixtec: Ñahni ndatu cha cua tava ndaa tiñu chi ñivi cuenda cha cuu ñi ñivi ñuun a cha cuenda ñuhun nu quee ñi cha ñahan a rai cuu ñi, a cuenda cuiya ñi, a tu pehe ñi, a ndahvi ñi a cuca ñi, a cuhvi ñi, a cuenda cha chinu ini ñi, a cuhva cha saxini ñi, a ñahan a rai cuni ñi, a cha ndaha ñi a ña tandaha ñi, a ndaa inca cha ndacu cha ña vaha cuni ñivi a cuni ñi casi ñi cha cuiti chi cha nuna cha iyo chi ñivi can.; Zapotec: Guiruti’ zanda gudxii deche tuuxa tisi binni huala’dxi’ laa, pa zá de gadxe guidxi, ne ca pa naca gunaa naca nguiu, pa nagoola, pa nahuiini’, pa napa xiixa, pa risaaca pa co’, pa nazaaca, pa huará, pa runi xiudu’, runi xtiidxa’ o guni guintiica gacala’dxi’ pa ma bichaaganá’ o pa co’ pa ca guniná ca xquenda ca binni ni cayapa lu gui’chi’ ro’ bia’ di’.; Mazatec: Ngó kjá mi ki tjí’nde nga yá ma ko̱chrjengi xákjén ra ta ki nga̱tjì la̱ nga xìn tje̱ nchrabá ni, nga xìn i̱’nde chja̱ ni, nga ’xi̱n ko̱ tsa chjo̱ón, kótjín nó tjín la̱, nga tjín ñánda̱ i̱ma̱ kji la̱, kó’sín nga tíjna, nga ’chin tjí’ta la̱, nga kji̱í ’sín makjiín la̱ ra a̱’ta ’tse̱ Naina̱, nga kji̱í ’sín tíjna kjo̱bítsjen la̱, nga kji̱í ’sín sasén la̱ ijo la̱ ra a̱’ta ’tse̱ chjo̱ón ko̱ ra a̱’ta ’tse ’xi̱n, kó’sín tíjna ra a̱’ta ’tse̱ kjoa̱bixan, ko̱ tsa ta ki ta mé kjoa̱ isa ni ra ma ’cho síko̱ jngo xi̱ta̱ koni ’sín bakien la̱ nga jcha̱xkón, jngo kjoa̱ ra mejèn la̱ si̱ikajen ngi ko̱ tsjá’chin la̱ jè kjoa̱hixi̱ ko̱ kó’sín nga tjíne la̱ xi̱ta̱ nga tjítsa̱jnandi̱ì.; Chinantec: Jaˋ cuǿøngˋ e nijmeáng’ˋ dseaˋ gaˋ jo̱guɨ e nijmɨ’uǿngˉ dseaˋ dseaˋ rúiñ’ˋ dsʉ’ uíi’˜ e seiiñˋ co̱o̱ˋ fɨɨˋ o̱si goodseaˋ lɨ˜ jié’ˋé, o̱si uíí’˜ e lɨ́ɨiñˊ dseañʉ’ˋ o̱si dseamɨ́ˋ, o̱si jó’ˋ ji̱i̱ˋ ngolíiñˉ, o̱si eeˋ eeˋ jaˋ ié’ˋ guotiɨ̱ɨ̱rˉ o̱si lɨ́ɨiñˊ dseaˋ tiñiingˉ o̱si dseaˋ seaˋ cuuˉ o̱si ee jmohuɨ́ɨˊ lɨ́ɨiñˊo̱si ˋeeˇ jmiféiiñˊ lafa’ diéeˇ quiá’rˉ o̱si eeˋ júuˆ fé’rˋ o̱si i̱iñˉ dseañʉ’ˋ o̱si dseamɨ́ˋo̱si sicúng’ˆ guoorˋ o̱si ó̱’ˋ lajo̱ lɨ́’ˆ doñiˊ eeˋ e jié’ˋ e nijméˉ e ni’léˉ quiá’ˉ dseaˋ o̱si e nijméˉ é ni’íingˉ jale’ e júuˆ e jmɨ’ǿng’ˋ yaang˜ dseaˋ o̱si e seengˋ dseaˇ e jaˋ i̱i̱ˋ jmiguíiˉ quiá’rˉ.; Mixe: Kabë ku’udujt ku pën ñëbyex ñëdyeenëëjët je’e gyëxpë ku kyunaax ayuuk jyëya’ayë o ku wiink kajpt chooñ, pë ya’adyëjk o pë tyo’oxyëjk, pë myutsk o pë maj, pë kaj pyedyëë kya’xyëëjë, pë ëyoob o pë mëyëë, pë oy’ajp o pë pëjkëp, pë wiink jaty religión ajxy myëbëjpy, pë tëgach jaty ajxy tyajy myay, mëdyii ajxy jyotkëdaakyp pë ya’adyëjk o pë to’oxyëjk, pë pëky o pë nëdyu’um’ajp, o mëdyiibë jaty ja jëya’ay yajtsëchë’ëwaamp nepy jëdu’un jyëya’ay’atyën, a mëdyii jëdu’un yajtëgoy’idaamb o yajku’umënakaamp ma ja jëya’ay ja ku’udujt ajxy myëëdën mët ku ajxy awa’atstuum y’ídët.; Zoque: Ji musi te tsa´ajkuy´tsiø jurø ne tsunh´ubømø, myumu ponistam te´iame, te´kiaku, ijtapase, jutse ijtu windam, te wyanjamokyuis, te kitsokyutyiam, te’ syutkuy, jutse´ma ijtu, anketyo eyabo tsøky tsujktøkøbiabois te´ itjkuy woko jana yajkea te´wiyun ijtkut ij te´ponis muspa tsojkyaø´anketiyø.; Chatino: A tucui ntsu’hui cha’ cuiya’ ’in ña’an ti’i ’in sca nten si’ya ycha’ nchcui’ ne’, ña’an ndyon ne’, uta chin’ yjan ne’ uta si’yana nde’en se’en ’in cunan ne’ a chcui cha’ ’in na, ta si’yana ti’i ne’, si’yana jo’o ti ña’an ndyon ne’, ta si’ya cha’ ndiya qui’an ti’ ne’, ta si’yana a ndi’in nten ’in ne’, uta si’ya ña’an nten nu nchca ti’ ne’ ta’a tyi’in ne’, uta si’ya ña’an cha’ tiyaa ’in ne’, uta nde’en tucui ca ti’ cu’ni ti’i lo’o ne’ uta a su’hua loo cha’ nu nga’an cha’ qui’ni ca’an ’in ne’.; Trique: A̱hi̱ huaj si gànàrì ninj sij daran’ nej guiì du’hui̱i ngà a’ngô nej sí ’na’ a’ngô país, yi’nïn’ïn, hio’ huaj sij, nej sí na’hue gìsìkì’ hue’ê nneè kú, nej si àko ran, a’nan’ sij ngà nneè kú sij, ahuin nuhuî yuman ruhuâ sij, dàj anï̂n ruhuâ sij, si̱ nagi’hiaj a̱hij si ya̱ka̱j sij sí ngà sij siyànà ngà ninj, dàj nne sij ngà nika sij dàj na̱nj hua ma̱’an sun uta’ ’hiaj ni̱ nitaj si ginikaj chrej ngà nej guiì huin ruhuâ gu̱du̱rë’, ni̱ gi̱’hiaj yì’ì nanì’hiaj nej guiì ni̱ sa hua̱ ni’nï̂nj riñan ninj.; Huave: Ngondom matsojaran nipilan mawüneran palwüx wüx nguia naw tengwüy nguiane imiün ajngot, wüx nguineay ajlüy, wüx mineat nej, wüx ngo palam ajlüy, wüx ajiür tengwüy ngo majiür tomiün, wüx miün andeow, wüx leaw andüüb mayak ichech, wüx leaw andeak, wüx jane andiüm majlüyeweaag, wüx angoch owixeran tengwüy kuajantanej alinoik leaw ayak tiül naél nipilan at wüx andiüm mapal teombas tengwüy mapeand tiüt leaw ambeol nej nipilan at ngo müüch marang leaw andiüm.; Cuicatec: Gua cane naⁿ chiⁿ diⁿ vi’i iy’aⁿ cucava dvacu ye’eⁿ yaⁿ u nduti tama ya’aⁿ yaⁿ, u nduti nd’ätä u sa’aⁿ yaⁿ, u nduyu yaⁿ, u nduti yinu yinu yaⁿ, u taca yinaca yaⁿ naⁿ vacu yaⁿ, u ä yita yaⁿ u gua yita yaⁿ, u nduti gua dama yitenuú nducu yaⁿ, u gua yidama acuto’ó nducu yaⁿ, u da’a yincadinu yaⁿ chiⁿ cuvi yaⁿ, u ä iy’aⁿ dma u nimmacu u ä da’a nun tama naⁿ chiⁿ yine c’ändä iy’aⁿ ne ndi ama naⁿ chu ne gua duva d’iⁿ chiⁿ gua cuvi nducu yan tanducu chiⁿ yitune.)

Under Mexican law, jurisprudential precedent is established when five rulings in a state reach the same conclusion on the same legal issue. Once this threshold is met, the precedent overrides conflicting provisions in state legislation. Consequently, same-sex marriages granted through amparo can be performed in any state, irrespective of whether the civil code has been amended. On 23 April 2014, the Supreme Court issued another amparo in favor of 39 same-sex couples. In 2016, a couple from San Juan Bautista Tuxtepec successfully obtained an amparo allowing them to marry. In July 2017, a same-sex couple in Oaxaca City married without resorting to an amparo, signaling a gradual normalization of the practice. The first recorded same-sex marriages in Santiago Jamiltepec and Salina Cruz occurred in April and May 2018, respectively, both granted through the recurso de amparo remedy.

=== Directive and passage of legislation in 2019 ===
On 26 August 2018, the state civil registry began allowing same-sex couples to marry without the need to first obtain an amparo. However, the process took three business days compared to two hours for opposite-sex couples. Lawyer Daniel Merlin Tolentino explained that the longer waiting time for same-sex couples was intended to "ensure the marriage would comply with jurisprudence". The civil registry would "carefully" review each marriage request from same-sex couples to confirm its legitimacy, as state law at the time still banned same-sex marriages. To marry, a couple had to present valid documents, including a marriage request, both spouses' birth certificates, official identification, and the results of a premarital medical test, and have at least four witnesses present. The cost was identical to that for heterosexual couples.

On 28 August 2019, the Congress of Oaxaca passed a bill in a 25–10 vote making the definition of marriage and concubinage in the Civil Code gender-neutral. The legislation was signed by Governor Alejandro Murat Hinojosa on 29 August, published in the official state journal on 5 October 2019 and came into effect that same day. Article 143 of the Civil Code was amended to read: Marriage is a civil contract entered into by two people, who come together to build a life in common and provide each other with respect, equality, and mutual support. (Note: Spanish: El matrimonio es un contrato civil celebrado entre dos personas, que se unen para realizar una vida en común y proporcionarse respeto, igualdad y ayuda mutua.)

28 August 2019 vote in the Congress
| Party | Voted for | Voted against | Abstained | Absent (Did not vote) |
|---|---|---|---|---|
| National Regeneration Movement | 17: Leticia Collado Soto; Elena Cuevas Hernández; Karina Espino Carmona; Migdalia Espinosa Manuel; Laura Estrada Mauro; Delfina Guzmán Díaz; Inés Leal Peláez; Magaly López Domínguez; Rocío Machuca Rojas; Pavel Meléndez Cruz; Hilda Pérez Luis; Gloria Sánchez López; Luis Silva Romo; Griselda Sosa Vásquez; Horacio Sosa Villavicencio; Timoteo Vásquez Cruz; Elisa Zepeda Lagunas | 3: Juana Aguilar Espinosa; Ángel Domínguez Escobar; Emilio García Aguilar | 4: Mauro Cruz Sánchez; Fredie Delfín Avendaño; Ericel Gómez Nucamendi; Arcelia López Hernández | 2: Othón Cuevas Córdova; Alejandro López Bravo |
| Institutional Revolutionary Party | 4: Alejandro Avilés Álvarez; Gustavo Díaz Sánchez; Yarith Tannos Cruz; Jorge Villacaña Jiménez | 2: María Mendoza Cruz; Magda Rendón Tirado | – | – |
| Labor Party | 3: Saúl Cruz Jiménez; Noé Doroteo Castillejos; César Morales Niño | – | – | – |
| Ecologist Green Party of Mexico | – | 2: Victoria Cruz Villar; Aurora López Acevedo | – | – |
| Social Encounter Party | – | 2: Fabrizio Díaz Alcázar; Arsenio Mejia García | – | – |
| National Action Party | – | 1: María Mendoza Sánchez | – | – |
| Independent | 1: Elim Antonio Aquino | – | – | 1: Aleida Serrano Rosado |
| Total | 25 | 10 | 4 | 3 |
| Total | 59.5% | 23.8% | 9.5% | 7.1% |

== Native Mexicans ==
While many Indigenous cultures historically practiced polygamy to some extent, there are no records of same-sex marriages being performed in these cultures in the way they are commonly defined in Western legal systems. However, many Indigenous communities recognize identities and relationships that may be placed on the LGBT spectrum. The Zapotec in Juchitán de Zaragoza and Tehuantepec recognize a third gender structure known as muxhe’. Muxhe’ are individuals assigned male at birth but who adopt aspects of feminine gender roles, including dress, behavior and social standing. They participate in feminine spheres of society, such as artisan work, household maintenance and merchantry.

== Marriage statistics ==
According to the civil registry of Oaxaca, 24 same-sex marriages were performed in the state in 2021.

== Public opinion ==
A 2017 opinion poll conducted by the Strategic Communication Office (Gabinete de Comunicación Estratégica) found that 43% of Oaxaca residents supported same-sex marriage, while 55% were opposed. According to a 2018 survey by the National Institute of Statistics and Geography, 52% of the Oaxaca public opposed same-sex marriage.

A 2020 survey conducted by the Center for Social Studies and Public Opinion (CESOP; Centro de Estudios Sociales y de Opinión Pública) on 1,400 respondents showed that 62% of Oaxacans were opposed to same-sex marriage, while 37% supported and the remaining 1% were undecided. Levels of support varied greatly with age. It was highest among 18–24-year-olds at 61% and 25–34-year-olds at 50%, while among those aged 55 and above 78% were opposed. Attitudes also varied among districts, with support highest in the 8th electoral district (which includes the state capital, Oaxaca City) at 59%, followed by the 6th electoral district (located in the western part of the state, containing municipalities from the Mixteca and Sierra Sur regions) at 58%. Opposition reached 90% in the 5th and 7th electoral districts in the eastern part of the state (containing the entirety of the Istmo Region). Women were also more likely to support same-sex marriage than men.

== See also ==
- Same-sex marriage in Mexico
- LGBT rights in Mexico
