= Recognition of same-sex unions in Botswana =

Botswana does not recognize same-sex marriages or civil unions. The Marriage Act, 2001 does not provide for the recognition of same-sex unions. In 2025, a same-sex couple filed a court case seeking the right to marry, Selelo v Acting Director of Civil Registration, before the High Court of Botswana. The lawsuit is scheduled to be heard in October 2026.

== Legal history ==
=== Background ===
Same-sex sexual relations were previously outlawed in Botswana under a British colonial-era law. This law was struck down by the High Court of Botswana in Letsweletse Motshidiemang v The Attorney-General in 2019, a ruling later upheld by an appellate court in 2021. This ruling, along with reforms to the employment law forbidding hiring discrimination on the basis of sexual orientation in 2010 and the registration of Botswana's largest LGBT advocacy organisation, LEGABIBO, in 2016, have cemented Botswana as a "[leader] in Southern Africa". Nevertheless, discrimination and abuse against LGBT people remain a "daily reality for many" and laws do not permit or recognise same-sex marriages or civil unions.

=== Restrictions ===
Same-sex sexual activity legal Same-sex marriage Limited recognition (foreign residency rights) No recognition of same-sex couples Same-sex sexual activity illegal Prison but not enforced Prison Death penalty on books but not enforced

The Marriage Act (Act 18 of 2001, Chapter 29:01; Tswana: Molao wa Manyalo; Kalanga: Tjisungo tjeNlayo we Ndobolo) does not expressly forbid same-sex marriages and does not contain a definition of marriage. However, it generally refers to married spouses as "husband" and "wife". The Constitution of Botswana also does not explicitly forbid marriages between people of the same sex. In 2021, a spokesperson for LEGABIBO said the issue of same-sex marriage was "likely to arise in [the] future", noting that the 2019 High Court judgement in Letsweletse Motshidiemang "might be relevant then" and hoping that "future possibilities may also include a change of law and acceptance of society towards gay marriages". "The offensive provisions of the Penal Code have long been struck down by the High Court and so same-sex conduct has not been criminal since then. This has opened new avenues for conversations to be heard regarding gay rights in total", they added. In addition, civil partnerships are not recognised in Botswana. As a result, cohabiting same-sex couples do not enjoy the same rights and benefits as married couples, including with regard to inheritance, tax benefits, adoption and alimony, among others.

In 2024, the Ministry of Labour and Home Affairs announced its intention to review the Marriage Act. It invited LGBT activists to participate in reviewing the legislation. The Ministry reported that "[t]hroughout the workshop, stakeholders addressed the challenge of balancing Botswana's diverse cultural and religious traditions with the need for a modern, inclusive legal framework. […] As the workshop concludes, stakeholders are finalizing recommendations expected to guide the amendments to the Marriage Act. These outcomes aim to create a legal framework that respects Botswana's traditions while embracing progress and inclusivity." In April 2026, the Minister of Labour and Home Affairs, Pius Mokgware, confirmed that the government had no stance regarding same-sex marriage and that his ministry was "reviewing the Marriage Act in line with the Constitution of Botswana, where consultations on issues such as this one will be entered into…", in response to a parliamentary question by an MP from the Botswana Patriotic Front.

=== Court case ===
In 2025, Bonolo Selelo and Tsholofelo Kumile brought a constitutional challenge, Selelo v Acting Director of Civil Registration, before the High Court seeking the right to marry. They argued that excluding same-sex couples from marriage violated rights protected by the Constitution of Botswana. The couple had attempted to register for the publication of banns at the Department of Civil and National Registration in Gaborone in April 2025, but their application was rejected on the basis that Botswana law did not permit marriage between people of the same sex and were reportedly advised to consider marrying in South Africa, where same-sex marriages are recognised. After a first hearing in February 2026, the High Court scheduled a first round of oral arguments on 14 and 15 July. On 4 September, the court admitted LEGABIBO as a co-applicant, three opposing organisations as respondents, and legal academic Onthatile Olerile Moeti as an amicus curiae. The main hearing was held on 22 and 23 October, with a judgement scheduled for 2 April 2027.

== Historical and customary recognition ==
While the Tswana historically practiced polygamy, there are no records of same-sex marriages being performed in local cultures in the way they are commonly defined in Western legal systems. However, there is evidence for identities and behaviours that may be placed on the LGBT spectrum. Contemporary oral evidence suggests that same-sex relationships were "common" and "prevalent" among Tswana miners in South Africa in the early 20th century. It was during this time through the mining compounds and the influence of South African languages that the contemporary term matanyola, meaning "anal sex", entered the Tswana language. These relationships differed strongly from the Western understanding of same-sex marriages, as men who entered these "mine marriages" continued to marry women and "conform, or appear to conform, to gender expectations" and would not consider themselves as homosexual or bisexual, or "unfaithful to [their] marriage vows. This practice gradually disappeared as Botswana became more modernized and exposed to Western culture and homophobia in the 20th century. Anal intercourse between men became illegal under colonial law during this time. The law was struck down by the High Court in 2019.

Evidence also suggests that same-sex sexual activity was previously "common and relatively accepted" by the San peoples. While the San maintain a system of simple marriage, they often practice polygamy and spousal exchange (ǃXóõ: ʼǁnūhm ʼǂná̰la ká).

== Religious performance ==
The Catholic Church, which has two dioceses in Botswana, one in Gaborone and the other in Francistown, opposes same-sex marriage and does not allow its priests to officiate at such marriages. In December 2023, the Holy See published Fiducia supplicans, a declaration allowing Catholic priests to bless couples who are not considered to be married according to church teaching, including the blessing of same-sex couples. The Southern African Catholic Bishops' Conference, representing bishops in Botswana, South Africa and Eswatini, released a statement saying that "the document offers suggestions for when and how the blessings might be given. The Southern African Catholic Bishops Conference will guide further on how such a blessing may be requested and granted to avoid the confusion the document warns against. In the meantime, the suggestions offered by the declaration may be taken as a guide with prudence." In 2015, the synod of the Evangelical Lutheran Church in Southern Africa discussed same-sex unions but concluded that "a marriage is understood as a union only between a man and a woman. Furthermore the valid and unchanged position of our Church is that the blessing of same sex unions is rejected [sic]." In 2020, the Methodist Church of Southern Africa voted to allow members, including ordained clergy, to enter into same-sex unions, while retaining the denomination's teaching that marriage is a union "between a man and a woman". The Church of the Province of Central Africa, part of the Anglican Communion, holds that "marriage, by divine institution, is a lifelong and exclusive union and partnership between one man and one woman".

In 2015, the General Synod of the Dutch Reformed Church voted by a 64% majority to recognise same-sex marriages, bless the relationships of same-sex couples and allow gay ministers and clergy (who are not required to be celibate). The decision applies to 9 of the 10 synods; with the Namibia Synod being excluded, but it does apply to the Northern Cape and Northern synods, which include parts of Botswana. The decision caused backlash and objections, resulting in it being reversed a year later. A dozen church members subsequently took the denomination to court to restore the 2015 decision. In 2019, the North Gauteng High Court reversed the decision, ruling that while religious organizations have the freedom to define marriage the 2016 decision to ban same-sex marriage was not made in accordance with the church's proper process. A freedom of conscience clause allows pastors with objections to opt out of performing same-sex weddings, so that individual pastors are free to choose whether to bless same-sex marriages.

== Public opinion ==
A 2024 survey by The Other Foundation showed that 70% of Batswana opposed same-sex marriage.

== See also ==
- Selelo v Acting Director of Civil Registration
- LGBT rights in Botswana
- Recognition of same-sex unions in Africa
- Same-sex marriage in South Africa
- Recognition of same-sex unions in Namibia
- Recognition of same-sex unions in Zimbabwe
