= Recognition of same-sex unions in Hong Kong =

Hong Kong does not recognise same-sex marriages or civil unions. However, same-sex couples are afforded limited legal rights as a result of several court decisions, including the right to apply for a spousal visa, spousal benefits for the partners of government employees, and guardianship rights and joint custody of children.

On 5 September 2023, the Hong Kong Court of Final Appeal ordered the government in Sham Tsz Kit v Secretary for Justice to introduce a legal framework allowing same-sex civil unions. Polling suggests that support for same-sex marriage is rising in Hong Kong, with a 2023 survey estimating that 60% of residents supported same-sex marriage.

== Immigration, tax and inheritance rights ==
Same-sex couples in Hong Kong have access to various limited legal benefits and rights as a result of several court decisions. These include the right to apply for a spousal visa, spousal benefits for the partners of government employees, inheritance, and guardianship rights and joint custody of children.

=== Leung Chun Kwong v Secretary for the Civil Service ===
In 2014, immigration officer Angus Leung Chun-kwong married his same-sex partner, Scott Adams, in New Zealand. Following the wedding, Leung attempted to update his marital status with the Civil Service Bureau, whose policy states that officers' partners can receive spousal benefits, which includes medical care and joint tax assessment. The Bureau rejected Leung's attempts to extend these benefits to Adams, prompting a legal challenge, Leung Chun Kwong v Secretary for the Civil Service, in court. On 28 April 2017, the Hong Kong High Court ruled in Leung's favour. In his landmark ruling, Mr Justice Anderson Chow Ka-ming called the Bureau's policy "indirect discrimination" and rejected its claim that it had "to act in line with the prevailing marriage law of Hong Kong" or that extending benefits to Leung's spouse would "undermine the integrity of the institution of marriage". The ruling was scheduled to take effect on 1 September 2017, but the Hong Kong Government appealed the ruling in May 2017.

The Court of Appeal began examining the case in December 2017, and ruled against the couple on 1 June 2018. The court ruled that there was a "legitimate aim" to "protect" opposite-sex marriage, arguing that only opposite-sex couples should enjoy the "freedom of marriage" and that same-sex couples should have no marital rights whatsoever. The court also stated that Leung and Adams could not pay taxes as a couple. The couple appealed the decision to the Court of Final Appeal, which heard oral arguments on 7 May 2019. On 6 June 2019, the Court of Final Appeal reversed the ruling of the Court of Appeal, holding that both the Civil Service Bureau and the Inland Revenue Department had unlawfully discriminated against the couple, and ruled that the same-sex spouse of a government employee should receive the same spousal benefits as an opposite-sex spouse. In 2020, the Inland Revenue Department issued regulations as a result of the court decision stating that "any married person – regardless if he or she is in a heterosexual marriage or same-sex marriage – is now entitled to elect joint assessment or personal assessment jointly with the person's spouse, as well as to claim allowances or deductions in respect of his or her spouse. In addition, he or she is also eligible to sponsor his or her spouse for a dependant visa/entry permit for entry into Hong Kong."

=== QT v Director of Immigration ===
A British woman (referred to as "QT") sued the Immigration Department after it refused to recognise her civil partnership and grant her a dependant visa. In February 2015, a judge agreed that the plaintiff had been discriminated against and moved the case to the High Court. The court heard oral arguments on 14 May 2015. After prolonged deliberation, it dismissed the case in March 2016. The woman appealed to the Court of Appeal, which agreed to hear arguments on 15 and 16 June 2017. The appeal was led by prominent human rights barrister Dinah Rose. On 25 September 2017, the Court of Appeal reversed the High Court's dismissal and ruled in favour of the woman. Chief Judge Andrew Cheung wrote that "times have changed and an increasing number of people are no longer prepared to accept the status quo without critical thought". Cheung added that the Immigration Department had failed to justify the "indirect discrimination on account of sexual orientation that QT suffers" and that "excluding a foreign worker's lawfully married (albeit same-sex) spouse or civil partner ... to join the worker is, quite obviously, counter-productive to attracting the worker to come to or remain in Hong Kong". The court ordered the woman and the department to work together on an agreement and submit it to the court within 28 days. The ruling was labelled "a big win" by Raymond Chan Chi-chuen, Hong Kong's first openly gay lawmaker. The Hong Kong Government appealed the ruling in November 2017.

The Court of Final Appeal handed down its ruling on 4 July 2018, finding in favour of the plaintiff and mandating immigration authorities to grant same-sex partners spousal visas that were previously only available to heterosexual couples. The panel of judges, led by Chief Justice Geoffrey Ma Tao-li, held that the "policy [of not granting a visa] is counterproductive and plainly not rationally connected to advancing [any] 'talent' aim" and rejected the Director's argument that same-sex unions differed from marriage, saying it was based on a "shaky foundation [and]...hardly satisfactory". The government said it "respected" the court's ruling and would study it in detail. The ruling became effective on 19 September 2018, when the Director of Immigration, Erick Tsang Kwok-wai, announced that the Department of Immigration would favourably consider an application for residency as a dependant from a person who has entered into "a same-sex civil partnership, same-sex civil union, same-sex marriage, or opposite-sex civil partnership or opposite-sex civil union outside Hong Kong", if the person meets the normal immigration requirements.

=== Ng Hon Lam Edgar v Secretary for Justice ===
In September 2020, the Hong Kong High Court ruled that same-sex couples should receive equal treatment under inheritance law. The case challenged the city's inheritance and intestacy laws which forbade a gay person from inheriting the estate of their partner without a will. Judge Anderson Chow Ka-ming ruled in Ng Hon Lam Edgar v Secretary for Justice that the policy was "unlawful discrimination". In March 2021, Henry Li Yik-ho challenged the government's refusal to recognise him as his partner's surviving spouse. Li's husband, Edgar Ng Hon-lam, died in early December 2020, but because their relationship was not recognised under Hong Kong law, Li was unable to attend to administrative arrangements as a next of kin without having authorisation from the spouse's mother. Li was prevented from making an application for a waiver of the autopsy of his spouse's body, was unable to attend his spouse's funeral and was requested to return all relevant documents and personal possessions of his deceased spouse to his family. "Mourning the loss of a spouse is undoubtedly one of the most difficult times in one's life. Many same-sex widows and widowers not only lost their loved ones, but they also lost their homes or the opportunity to make after-death arrangements for their loved ones, simply because the law currently does not protect LGBT+ people such as the Applicant. In view of this, the Applicant is filing this judicial review in order to continue his husband's legacy in pursuing LGBT+ equality in Hong Kong", a statement accompanying the case read. In October 2021, Li withdrew his lawsuit after government officials had affirmed that it would treat surviving same-sex spouses equally to surviving heterosexual spouses when making after-death arrangements for their deceased partners.

=== S v KG ===
In May 2021, the Court of First Instance ruled in favor of equal parental rights for lesbian couples in S v KG (also known as AA v BB). The court ruled that following the breakdown of the relationship the non-biological mother should be granted joint custody, shared care and guardianship rights of her children, despite not being legally recognized as the children's mother.

== Civil partnerships ==
Laws regarding homosexuality in Asia Same-sex sexual activity legal Marriage performed Marriage recognized Other type of partnership Unregistered cohabitation No recognition of same-sex couples Ambiguous Restriction on freedom of expression, not enforced Severe restriction of association with arrests or detention Same-sex sexual activity illegal Prison, not enforced Prison Death penalty on books, not enforced Enforced death penalty

=== Court cases ===
==== MK v Government of HKSAR ====
Arguing that her rights to privacy and equality had been violated, amounting to a breach of the Basic Law and the Bill of Rights Ordinance, a woman, known as "MK", filed MK v Government of HKSAR in court in June 2018, challenging the government's refusal to allow her to enter into a civil partnership with her female partner. The High Court heard the case in a preliminary brief 30-minute hearing in August 2018. In April 2019, a judge rejected a bid by the Roman Catholic Diocese of Hong Kong and conservative groups to intervene in the litigation. The diocese had argued that the outcome of the court case could lead to "reverse discrimination", though the court rejected this argument on the basis that it was founded on social views and not law. Oral arguments were heard on 28 May 2019. During the hearing, Stewart Wong, a government lawyer, defended the existing law, saying, "Not all differences in treatment are unlawful. You are not supposed to treat unequal cases alike. To recognise an alternative form of same-sex relationships which we say is tantamount to [marriage] is to undermine the traditional institution of marriage and the family constituted by such a marriage". Arguing that civil partnerships carry the same legal rights as marriage, but generally do not include the ceremony and exchanges of wedding vows, this would make marriage and civil unions effectively identical "in substance", the government lawyer added. The High Court dismissed the case in October 2019. The court held that the issue of same-sex unions "is beyond the proper scope of the functions or powers of the court". Nevertheless, it stated that "there is much to be said for the government to undertake a comprehensive review on this matter".

==== Sham Tsz Kit v Secretary for Justice ====
In January 2019, two men launched legal challenges against Hong Kong's same-sex marriage ban, arguing that the government's refusal to recognize same-sex marriages violated the Basic Law. On 18 September 2020, the High Court ruled against a case, Sham Tsz Kit v Secretary for Justice, seeking to recognise foreign same-sex marriages. The court held that the government did not have a positive obligation to provide an alternative legal framework to marriage such as civil unions or registered partnerships, and that denying same-sex couples the right to marry in Hong Kong was not unconstitutional. Activist Jimmy Sham, who married his partner in New York in 2014 and sought legal recognition of that marriage in Hong Kong, argued that it was "unfair and discriminatory" that same-sex couples did not enjoy the same rights and benefits as married opposite-sex couples. The Court of Appeal upheld the High Court's dismissal in August 2022.

In November 2022, the Court of Appeal granted leave to appeal to the Court of Final Appeal because "the matter concerns issues of great general public importance". Oral arguments were heard in the Court of Final Appeal on 28 June 2023. The court issued its ruling on 5 September 2023, upholding the same-sex marriage ban but ordering the government to introduce an alternative legal framework for same-sex couples within two years.

=== Legislative action ===
In November 2018, Councilor Raymond Chan Chi-chuen proposed a motion to study civil unions for same-sex couples in Hong Kong, but this was voted down by 27 votes to 24 in the Legislative Council.

==== Registration of Same-sex Partnerships Bill 2025 ====
The Registration of Same-sex Partnerships Bill (Chinese: 同性伴侶關係登記條例草案) was a bill introduced by the Government of Hong Kong that proposed to create a framework for granting limited legal rights to same-sex partnerships entered into overseas. The bill was part of the government's response to the Court of Final Appeal's decision in Sham Tsz Kit v Secretary for Justice that a substitute legal framework for same-sex partnerships must be introduced, and did not propose to recognise same-sex marriage.

Despite the existence of a pro-government supermajority in the legislature, the bill was staunchly opposed by the conservative majority of the bloc and was overwhelmingly rejected at the second reading. It became the first government bill to be voted down since the 2021 Hong Kong electoral changes.

== Same-sex marriage ==
=== Background ===
Section 40 of the Marriage Ordinance (Cap. 181; 婚姻條例; fānyān tìuh laih, pronounced [fɐ́njɐ́n tʰȉːu̯ lɐ̀i̯]) states that: "(1) Every marriage under this Ordinance shall be a Christian marriage or the civil equivalent of a Christian marriage. (2) The expression Christian marriage or the civil equivalent of a Christian marriage (基督敎婚禮或相等的世俗婚禮) implies a formal ceremony recognised by the law as involving the voluntary union for life of one man and one woman to the exclusion of all others." As a result, same-sex marriage is not recognised in Hong Kong.

In December 2017, a South China Morning Post editorial expressed support for the legalisation of same-sex marriage in Hong Kong, calling on the government to show a greater commitment to equality. In July 2018, the Chief Executive of Hong Kong, Carrie Lam, said that the government had no plans to legalise same-sex marriage. Lam reiterated her position in March 2019, saying that the issue was still "controversial". In May 2019, the chairman of the Equal Opportunities Commission, Ricky Chu Man-kin, expressed support for a step-by-step approach, beginning with a law banning discrimination on the basis of sexual orientation in employment, housing and other areas. Chu said he would not push for a legislative timetable on same-sex marriage, but urged the community to "change tack" in favour of a pragmatic step-by-step approach to break the "eternal stalemate" in the city's fight for LGBT rights, "Instead of focusing on abstract and ideological debates that we can never easily come to an agreement on, let's make small progress in tackling discrimination at the workplace, schools and public facilities". The ruling pro-Beijing parties, the Democratic Alliance for the Betterment and Progress of Hong Kong and the Hong Kong Federation of Trade Unions, have called same-sex partnerships a threat to "traditional family values". In 2023, legislator Junius Ho said that advocacy for same-sex marriage was an "unhealthy trend supported by the west".

In June 2024, ten same-sex couples were married in Kowloon alongside family and friends, though the marriages lack legal recognition in Hong Kong. The couples married through an online civil marriage service established by the U.S. state of Utah. The marriages were officiated by Zoom and for an additional fee the couples can obtain an apostille validation stamp for the marriage license provided by Utah state authorities.

=== W v Registrar of Marriages ===
In 2008, the Registrar of Marriages denied a transgender woman, identified only as "W", and her fiancé's application to marry. Despite "W" having undergone sex reassignment surgery and her identity card and passport having been changed to reflect her legal gender, her assigned sex was still recorded as male on her birth certificate. The Registrar argued that the couple were of the same sex and that it could not issue a marriage license. "W" argued that the Registrar had violated her constitutional right to marry as well as her right to privacy and brought the case, W v Registrar of Marriages, to court for judicial review. In the Court of First Instance, Justice Andrew Cheung upheld the Registrar's decision, and the Court of Appeal later dismissed an appeal. "W" appealed the case to the Court of Final Appeal, which overturned the lower courts' decisions on 13 May 2013 and held that she could marry her fiancé. The court held that she was entitled to be recognised as a woman under the Marriage Ordinance, and therefore was eligible to marry a man. However, the court issued a stay for a year to allow time for the government to amend the relevant law. In spring of 2014, it was announced that though the law had not been amended, transgender citizens could start marrying in July. Some activists have expressed their discontent with the provision that a transgender person must undergo sex reassignment surgery to marry. On 17 July 2014, it was announced that transgender citizens could marry and that the law would be finalised after the summer legislative recess. The Legislative Council voted against a proposed bill to reflect the court's ruling in October 2014. Nevertheless, the Court of Final Appeal's ruling is still in effect.

=== Religious performance ===
The Catholic Church opposes same-sex marriage and does not allow its priests to officiate at such marriages. In December 2023, the Holy See published Fiducia supplicans, a declaration allowing Catholic priests to bless couples who are not considered to be married according to church teaching, including the blessing of same-sex couples. The Roman Catholic Diocese of Hong Kong released a statement on 23 December that the declaration "is not only rooted in biblical tradition and Church teaching, but also highlights Pope Francis' keen pastoral instincts.", adding that it hoped "that more people in society will experience God's mercy and blessings through the inspiring message of this declaration."

== Public opinion ==
A 2014 survey found that 74% of Hong Kong residents supported granting same-sex couples either all or some of the benefits associated with marriage.

A 2017 poll conducted by the University of Hong Kong found that 50.4% of Hong Kong residents supported same-sex marriage.

An August 2022 poll conducted by the Hong Kong Public Opinion Research Institute found that 86% Hongkongers aged 18 to 40 thought that people from the LGBT community "should be treated fairly and should not be discriminated against". 75% of young Hongkongers supported same-sex marriage in the city. A 2023 survey conducted by the Centre for Comparative and Public Law at the University of Hong Kong, the Sexualities Research Programme at the Chinese University of Hong Kong, and the Human Rights Law Program at the University of North Carolina School of Law showed that 60% of Hong Kong residents supported same-sex marriage, while 17% were opposed and 23% were neutral.

A June–September 2023 Pew Research Center poll showed that 58% of Hongkongers supported same-sex marriage, while 40% opposed and 2% were undecided or had refused to answer. Support was highest among the religiously unaffiliated at 63%, and lowest among Christians at 49% and Buddhists at 48%. When divided by age, support was highest among 18–34-year-olds at 78% and lowest among those aged 35 and above at 52%. Women (61%) were also more likely to support same-sex marriage than men (55%).

== See also ==
- LGBT rights in China
- Homosexuality in China
- Recognition of same-sex unions in China
- Recognition of same-sex unions in Asia
