= Sham Tsz Kit v Secretary for Justice =

Hong Kong Court of Final Appeal case

Sham Tsz Kit v. Secretary for Justice
- Court: Court of Final Appeal
- Argued: 28-29 June 2023
- Decided: 5 September 2023
- Citation: (2023) 26 HKCFAR 385, [2023] HKCFA 28

Case history
- Prior actions: Lower court decisions siding with the government: Sham Tsz Kit v Secretary for Justice [2022] HKCA 1247; Sham Tsz Kit v Secretary for Justice [2020] HKCFI 2411; Leave to appeal granted, Sham Tsz Kit v Secretary for Justice [2022] HKCA 1690

Questions presented
- Is there a constitutional right to same-sex marriage under Article 25 of the Basic Law and Article 22 of Hong Kong Bill of Rights?; Does the absence of any alternative means of legal recognition of same-sex partnership constitute a violation of Article 14 of the Hong Kong Bill of Rights (on privacy) and/or Article 25 of the Basic Law and Article 22 of the Hong Kong Bill of Rights (on equality)?; Does the non-recognition of foreign same-sex marriage constitute a violation of Article 25 of the Basic Law and Article 22 of the Hong Kong Bill of Rights?

Court membership
- Judges sitting: Chief Justice Andrew Cheung; permanent judges Roberto Ribeiro, Joseph Fok, and Johnson Lam; non-permanent judge Patrick Keane

Case opinions
- Majority: Ribeiro PJ and Justice Fok PJ, joined by Justice Keane NPJ
- Concur/dissent: Chief Justice Cheung
- Concur/dissent: Justice Lam PJ

Sham Tsz Kit v Secretary for Justice [2023] HKCFA 28 is a landmark Hong Kong Court of Final Appeal case which ruled that the right to form registered partnerships is guaranteed to same-sex couples by the right to privacy under Article 14 of the Bill of Rights. The Court of Final Appeal delivered its judgment on 5 September 2023, following an appeal hearing held on 28 to 29 June 2023. Prior to this decision, the Court of First Instance and Court of Appeal each dismissed the judicial review.

In a 3–2 decision (with Chief Justice Cheung and Justice Lam PJ dissenting), the court found that the government's failure to alternative means of legal recognition of same-sex partnerships violated the rights of same-sex couples, and directed the government to establish an alternative framework for the legal recognition of same-sex relationships, with equivalent rights and obligations to marriage, within two years of the ruling. However, the court also unanimously ruled that same-sex couples do not have a constitutionally guaranteed right to marry. In response to the judgment, the government introduced a bill in the Legislative Council to implement the decision in July 2025, but was overwhelmingly defeated.

== Background ==
Jimmy Sham Tsz-kit is a Hong Kong permanent resident and a political activist presently jailed for alleged subversion under the National Security Law. He is gay, and has had a stable same-sex partner since 2011, who is also a Hong Kong permanent resident. Because Hong Kong law does not permit same-sex marriages or civil partnerships, Sham married his partner in New York.

== Court of Appeal ==
The Court of Appeal held:

=== Right to marry ===
BL37 provides that the freedom of marriage of Hong Kong residents and their right to raise a family freely shall be protected by law. On a purposive interpretation, the historical context supports the interpretation that BL37 only extends to heterosexual marriages. Although the Court accepted that fundamental rights should be generously interpreted, a proper interpretation requires these fundamental rights to be read together with other provisions of BL as a coherent whole. Lex specialis prevails over lex generalis.

BL37 is the lex specialis on the right to marry and prefers heterosexual marriage, whereas BL25, BOR22, and BOR14 are general provisions which do not specify a right to marry. Therefore, BL25, BOR22, and BOR14 are not engaged and the question of justification did not arise.

=== Civil partnerships ===
On a proper interpretation, BOR14 does not impose a duty to recognise civil partnerships, locally or overseas.

== Court of Final Appeal ==
On 10 November 2022, the Court of Appeal granted permission to appeal to the Court of Final Appeal on the following certified questions of law:

1. Does the exclusion of same-sex couples from the institution of marriage constitute a violation of the right to equality enshrined in Article 22 of the Bill of Rights ("BOR22") and Article 25 of the Basic Law ("BL25")?
2. Do the laws of Hong Kong, insofar as they do not allow same-sex marriage or provide any alternative means of legal recognition of same-sex partnerships, constitute a violation of the right to privacy under BOR14 and/or the right to equality enshrined in BOR22 and BL25?
3. Do the laws of Hong Kong, insofar as they do not recognise foreign same-sex marriage, constitute a violation of the right to equality enshrined in BOR22 and BL25?

On 5 September 2023, the Court of Final appeal ruled in that while the exclusion of same-sex couples in the city's marriage laws did not violate the right to equality under the Basic Law (BL25 / BOR22), the government's lack of recognition of same-sex partnerships violated the right to privacy under BOR14, being provisions equivalent to Article 17 of the International Covenant on Civil and Political Rights and part of the Basic Law as a result of BL39, which applied the said International Covenant on Civil and Political Rights. The ruling is suspended for two years in order to give the government time to comply with the decision.

== Reactions ==
The ruling was mostly welcomed by the LGBT community in Hong Kong, with some activists seeing it as an "improvement".

In contrast, the Equal Opportunities Commission, Hong Kong's equality watchdog, stated it had "no comment" on the decision, explaining that recognition of overseas same-sex marriages in Hong Kong was "outside the scope" of existing anti-discrimination ordinances, which do not protect sexual minorities. Junius Ho, a pro-Beijing lawmaker, attacked the decision and suggested that the government ask Beijing to overturn the court's ruling.

== See also ==
- LGBT rights in Hong Kong
- Recognition of same-sex unions in Hong Kong
