= Marriage Act, 2001 =

Act of the Parliament of Botswana

Parliament of Botswana
- Long title: An Act to make provision for the solemnisation and registration of marriages and for incidental matters.
- Citation: Act 18 of 2001; Cap. 29:01
- Passed by: National Assembly of Botswana
- Passed: 31 July 2001
- Assented to: 17 December 2001
- Commenced: 28 December 2001

Legislative history
- Bill title: Marriage Bill 16 of 2000
- Introduced by: Daniel Kwelagobe

Repeals
- Bechuanaland Protectorate Marriage Proclamation, 1917

Text of statute as originally enacted
- Status: Current legislation

The Marriage Act, 2001 is an Act of Parliament of Botswana which regulates the solemnisation and registration of civil marriages and the registration of marriages contracted under customary law or according to Muslim, Hindu or other religious rites. It is cited in the official consolidated laws as Act 18 of 2001, Cap. 29:01 and commenced on 28 December 2001. The Act as enacted bore the heading Marriage Act, 2000, although it was numbered as Act No. 18 of 2001 and is commonly referred to as the Marriage Act, 2001.

The Act repealed and replaced the previous Marriage Act, which itself derived from the colonial-era marriage law of the Bechuanaland Protectorate. It retained the basic civil-marriage framework of banns, special licences, marriage officers, witnesses and official registers, while introducing or consolidating provisions on registration of non-civil marriages, minimum age, consent to marriage, cross-system impediments and marriage records.

The Act is central to public-law and family-law debates in Botswana. It has been considered in relation to children's rights, the age of marriage, the legal status of persons with mental illness, the registration of customary and religious marriages and, in the 2020s, litigation over whether same-sex couples may marry under Botswana law.

== Background ==
=== Colonial marriage law ===
Modern statutory marriage law in Botswana developed from the law of the Bechuanaland Protectorate. In 1917 the Protectorate administration promulgated the Bechuanaland Protectorate Marriage Proclamation, 1917, formally titled a proclamation "to make further and better provision for marriages within the Bechuanaland Protectorate and to amend existing laws relating thereto". The proclamation repealed earlier instruments, including previous proclamations and Cape colonial marriage provisions as applied to the Protectorate, while preserving marriages already solemnised under those laws.

The 1917 proclamation applied to marriages within the Protectorate except marriages contracted "according to native law or custom".It established a system recognisable in later Botswana legislation: publication of banns or issue of a special licence, solemnisation before a marriage officer, two witnesses, use of a prescribed marriage formula, registration of the marriage and use of certified copies as proof of the marriage. It also contained impediments to marriage, including rules concerning an existing spouse, capacity and age. Under the 1917 text, the minimum ages were differentiated by sex: sixteen for males and fourteen for females.

After independence, Botswana retained a mixed marriage-law system. Civil marriages were governed by statute, while customary marriages continued to exist under customary law. Religious marriages were also recognised in practice, although the relationship between civil solemnisation, customary-law marriage and religious rites required statutory regulation, particularly for registration and evidentiary purposes.

=== Need for reform ===
The 2001 Act was framed as a re-enactment of the existing Marriage Act with amendments. A contemporary legal update described the Marriage Bill 16 of 2000 as a Bill whose objects included re-enacting the Marriage Act and making registration of customary, Muslim, Hindu and other religious marriages obligatory. The enacted statute repealed the former Marriage Act, Cap. 29:01, but preserved certain things done under the repealed Act, including subsidiary legislation and appointments, until replaced under the new Act. The Act was therefore not a complete abandonment of the earlier civil-marriage model. Rather, it substantially modernised and restated the law. It retained the civil marriage machinery inherited from earlier law but added more explicit rules on different marriage systems, minors, consent, prohibited degrees, registration of customary and religious marriages and administrative appeals.

== Passage ==
The Bill was introduced as the Marriage Bill 16 of 2000. The enacted Act records that it was passed by the National Assembly on 31 July 2001 and signed by the Clerk of the National Assembly, C. T. Mompei. It received assent on 17 December 2001 and came into operation on 28 December 2001. The Act's enactment followed the pattern of a consolidating and reforming family-law statute. It repealed the previous Marriage Act but included savings provisions so that subsidiary legislation, appointments, notices, licences, dispensations, permissions and other things done under the repealed law could continue as though made under the new Act, unless inconsistent with it.

== Provisions ==
The Act is divided into three Parts and contains thirty-three sections. Part I deals with the preliminaries and solemnisation of civil marriages. Part II deals with registration of marriages contracted under customary law and under Muslim, Hindu and other religious rites. Part III contains general provisions, including registers, appeals, regulations, repeal and savings.

=== Application of Part I ===
Part I applies to marriages solemnised in Botswana, except marriages contracted according to customary law or according to Muslim, Hindu or other religious rites. Those excluded marriages are instead dealt with separately under Part II, which requires their registration. Under section 3, a marriage is not valid unless either banns of marriage have been published within the previous three months or a special licence has been granted by an administrative officer. Banns may be published in a church, other place of worship or administrative office and are published on three successive weeks. A special licence may be granted where the administrative officer is satisfied that no lawful impediment exists and that the prescribed fee has been paid.

=== Protection of minors ===
The Act contains provisions designed to protect minors and children of persons seeking to marry. Where a person applying for banns or a special licence is a widow, widower or person with minor children, the administrative officer must satisfy themselves that the interests of the minor children have been protected. The Act authorises inquiry into whether the children are maintained or whether adequate provision has been made for them. The Act also regulates consent for persons under twenty-one. A person who is below twenty-one years old and is not a widow or widower may not marry without the written consent of each parent or guardian. If parents disagree, are absent, are incapable of giving consent, or if no guardian has been appointed, the Act provides mechanisms for the matter to be considered by a magistrate or administrative officer. The absolute minimum age for marriage under the Act is eighteen. Section 14 prohibits the solemnisation of a marriage where either party is below the age of eighteen. Botswana later reported to the United Nations Committee on the Rights of the Child that the 2001 amendment had raised the age of marriage and required parental or guardian consent for persons aged eighteen to twenty-one.

=== Marriage officers ===
A marriage under Part I must be solemnised by a marriage officer. The Act identifies administrative officers as marriage officers by virtue of office and also allows ministers of religion or other responsible persons to be appointed as marriage officers by the Minister by notice in the Gazette. The Minister may suspend or cancel such an appointment where a marriage officer has contravened the Act or where there is good reason to do so. These provisions preserve the mixed civil and religious structure of statutory marriage. A marriage may be solemnised by a state official or by an appointed religious officer, but its civil validity depends on compliance with the Act.

=== Solemnisation ===
A marriage must be solemnised in the presence of the parties and two competent witnesses. The Act generally requires marriages to be solemnised between six o'clock in the morning and six o'clock in the evening, subject to exceptions provided by the Act. The Act prescribes the form and content of the marriage ceremony. A marriage officer may use the rites or usages of a religious denomination, provided that the parties are made to declare that they take one another as husband and wife. Alternatively, the Act provides a civil form of words to be used by the marriage officer. Before solemnising the marriage, the marriage officer must explain certain legal consequences of the marriage to the parties. These include that the marriage is a legal union, that it bars either party from marrying another person while it subsists, that it may be dissolved only by a competent court and that a further marriage during its subsistence may amount to bigamy.

=== Registration and proof of civil marriages ===
After solemnisation, the marriage officer must immediately enter the marriage in a marriage register. The register records details including the place and date of marriage, the parties' names, ages, marital status, residence, the publication of banns or grant of a special licence and any required consent for a minor. The marriage officer must transmit a duplicate of the entry to the Registrar, who is required to record it in the general register. A certified copy of an entry in the register is prima facie evidence of the marriage. The Act also permits the Registrar to provide certified copies, subject to payment of the prescribed fee.

=== Impediments to marriage ===
The Act prohibits the solemnisation of a marriage where a lawful impediment exists. It deals expressly with the interaction between civil marriage and customary or religious marriage systems. A person who is already married under civil law may not contract a customary or religious marriage with another person during the subsistence of the civil marriage. Similarly, a person who is already married under customary law or under Muslim, Hindu or other religious rites may not contract a civil marriage with a different person while that marriage subsists.

The Act nevertheless allows the same couple to regularise their union under another system. Parties married under customary law or under religious rites may marry each other under Part I and parties already married under Part I may contract a customary or religious marriage with each other, without the later marriage being void solely because of the earlier marriage between the same persons.

Section 14 prohibits the marriage of a person below eighteen and of a person described in the Act as an "insane person" incapable of understanding the nature and consequences of marriage.The language concerning mental incapacity later became a subject of proposed statutory reform. Section 18 prohibits marriages within certain degrees of relationship. It provides that persons related by blood, marriage or affinity within the direct or collateral relationships listed by the Act may not marry one another and that a marriage contracted contrary to the section is void.

=== Offences and penalties ===
The Act creates offences relating to unlawful solemnisation, false statements, failure to register marriages and breach of statutory duties. A marriage officer who solemnises a marriage contrary to the Act may be liable to a fine or imprisonment. The Act also penalises false statements, omissions and improper conduct in relation to marriage registers and certificates. For customary, Muslim, Hindu and other religious marriages, failure to register the marriage within the statutory period is punishable by a fine not exceeding P800 or imprisonment for a term not exceeding one year, or both.

== Customary and religious marriages ==
Part II of the Act applies to marriages contracted according to customary law and to marriages contracted according to Muslim, Hindu or other religious rites. The Act does not invalidate such marriages merely because they were contracted outside the Part I civil-marriage procedure. Instead, it creates a registration regime for them. A marriage falling within Part II must be registered within two months of its contraction. Either spouse may apply for registration. The Registrar is required to record the parties' identities, the date of the marriage, any property or bride price paid as bogadi and other prescribed details. The Registrar then issues a certificate of registration, which is prima facie evidence of the marriage. The Act also allows registration of marriages contracted before commencement of the Act. Chiefs and headmen are made ex officio registrars of customary-law marriages within their districts, integrating traditional authorities into the statutory registration system.

== Administration ==
Marriage registration is administered through Botswana's civil registration system. The Government of Botswana describes marriage registration as serving both statistical and evidentiary purposes, including providing official proof of the marriage for the parties. In current public-service guidance, prospective spouses register their intention to marry, submit the required documents and, depending on the procedure used, proceed by banns or special licence. The Act is supplemented by regulations. The Marriage (Forms) Regulations, 2004, made under section 30 of the Act, prescribe forms and procedural materials including forms for publication of banns, special marriage licences, applications for appointment as marriage officers, civil marriage registers, declarations of marriage status and fees.

== Interaction with other legislation ==
=== Matrimonial property and marital power ===
The Act regulates the creation and registration of marriages, but the proprietary and personal consequences of marriage are dealt with by other statutes and the common law. A major post-2001 reform was the Abolition of Marital Power Act, 2004, which abolished the common-law marital power of a husband over the person and property of his wife. That Act commenced on 1 May 2005 and applies to civil marriages, but expressly excludes marriages contracted under customary law or religious rites.

This law has been criticised for leaving women in customary and religious marriages outside the protection of the reform. The distinction is significant because the Marriage Act itself recognises and requires registration of those marriages, while the Abolition of Marital Power Act does not extend its principal protection to them.

=== Children's Act and child-rights law ===
The Marriage Act's treatment of persons aged eighteen to twenty-one has been a recurring issue in later law reform. The Children's Act, 2009 defines a child as a person below eighteen and gives effect to aspects of the Convention on the Rights of the Child in Botswana law. Because the Marriage Act requires parental or guardian consent for persons below twenty-one, while prohibiting marriage below eighteen, it has been described in public debate as requiring harmonisation with children's legislation.

== Proposed amendments and review ==
=== Marriage Amendment Bill ===
In 2018, Dithapelo Keorapetse, MP for Selibe-Phikwe West, gazetted a private member's Marriage Amendment Bill. The Bill sought to reduce the age at which a person could marry without parental consent from twenty-one to eighteen, in order to harmonise the Marriage Act with the Children's Act and the Convention on the Rights of the Child. It was also reported to address the rights of persons with mental illness and persons of different religious backgrounds.

In 2021 Parliament rejected a further private member's Marriage Amendment Bill in a 33-16 vote. Keorapetse argued that the Bill was intended to align the Marriage Act with the best interests of the child, the Penal Code and the age of consent; to remove derogatory terminology concerning mental illness; to prohibit marriages of persons below eighteen; and to validate religious and traditional marriages only where both parties were at least eighteen.

The Minister of Nationality, Immigration and Gender Affairs, Anna Mokgethi, opposed proceeding with the private Bill on the basis that her ministry was already reviewing the Act and preparing a government Bill. She stated that consultations had taken place with the Ntlo ya Dikgosi, civil society organisations, faith-based organisations and the public and that further regulations were needed for religious and customary marriages.

== Same-sex marriage litigation ==
The Act does not contain a single express definition of marriage as a union between a man and a woman. Its operative provisions, however, use gendered language such as "bridegroom", "bride", "husband" and "wife". In 2026, the Act became the subject of litigation concerning whether same-sex couples may marry under Botswana law.

The case arose after Bonolo Selelo and Tsholofelo Kumile attempted to marry and were refused. The couple challenged the refusal in court. According to reporting in The Guardian, the Attorney General's position was that the Act contemplated marriage between a bride and bridegroom, or husband and wife, understood conventionally as a man and a woman. The applicants relied in part on the Interpretation Act, arguing that words importing one gender may include another unless the contrary intention appears.
