= Ayodele Olofintuade =

Nigerian writer, journalist and feminist

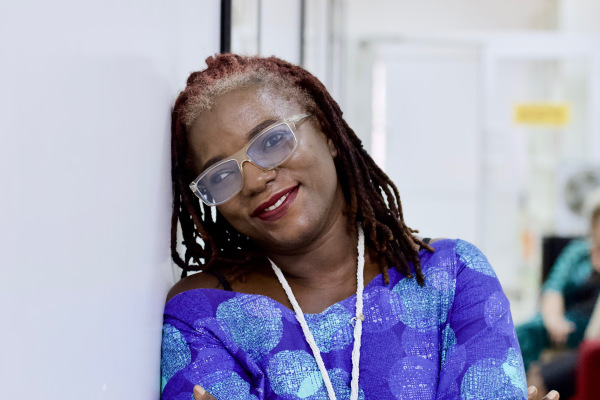
- Born: Ayọ̀délé Ọlọ́fintúádé; Ibadan, Nigeria
- Citizenship: Nigerian
- Occupations: Writer, journalist and feminist
- Website: Official website

Ayodele Olofintuade is a Nigerian writer, journalist, and feminist. They identify as queer and non-binary in Nigeria, an anti-LGBTQ country.

== Biography ==
Born in Ibadan, Nigeria, Olofintuade grew up between Lagos, Ibadan and Abeokuta. They are a self-supporting, full-time writer whose works are focused primarily on feminism in Africa, Yorùbá spirituality (cutting across Africa and the Diaspora) the Nigerian LGBTQ community, and gender non-conforming persons in Nigeria. Olofintuade has two children.

== Writing ==
Their first major work of literature was Eno's Story (2010), a children's story published by Cassava Republic Press and shortlisted for the Nigeria Prize for Literature in 2011. It addressed the issue of child-trafficking that has been plaguing Nigeria for a long time.

Their first major article on LGBTQ persons in Nigeria, "The A-B-C of Sexuality" (2014) on NigeriansTalk, was published immediately after the passage of the Same Sex Marriage Act of 2013 as part of the advocacy tools for the promulgation of the law. It was around this same time they also published their first major serialised novella, Adunni: The Beautiful Ones Have not yet Died (2014) on Brittle Paper, in which some of the characters were queer.

Olofintuade writes both for adults and children, especially children from disadvantaged areas. They are also an activist. Their first book, in 2011, was shortlisted for the Nigeria Prize for Literature. They have had their work published in numerous magazines and journals in Nigeria, including NigeriansTalk and Anathema. Olofintuade is also the managing director of a website about the negative impact of inequality.

In 2019, Olofintuade published thrie fiction titled Lakiroboto Chronicles, the book was later re-published in 2023 by Cypher press.

Olofintuade's deep knowledge of Yorùbá spirituality and culture means that they are an important go-to for younger artists. With Laipo Read, they provide educational support for children from basic to secondary-school level.

== Bibliography ==
- Eno's Story (Cassava Republic, 2010)
- Lakiriboto Chronicles (Independently published, 2019)
- The Whirlwind
- Adunni: The Beautiful One Has not Yet Died
- King of the Heap
- King of the Heap Learns to Read
- Children of the Rainbow
- Swallow; Efunsetan Aniwuran (Masobe, 2022)
- Swallow; Efunporonye Osintinubu (Masobe, 2024)
- The Shit and the Sunrise edited by edited by Ayodele Olufintuade and Adebayo Quadri-Adekanbi (Iwalewabooks, 2025)
