= LGBTQ rights in Northern Nigeria =

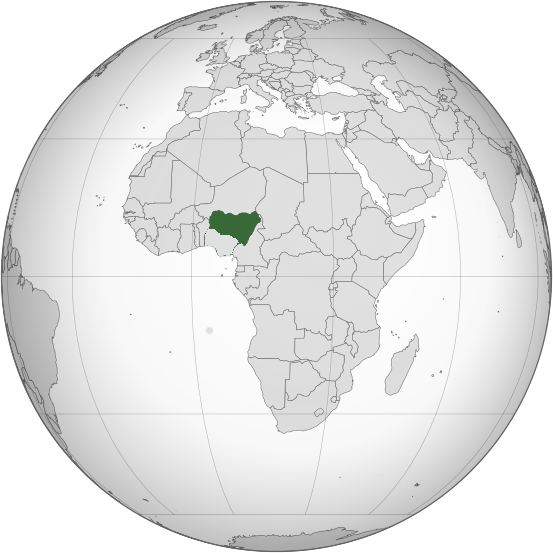
- Northern Nigeria
- Legal status: Illegal since 1904 (as Northern Nigeria Protectorate)
- Penalty: States under Shari'a law: Death (Applies in Boko Haram/ISIL run areas to everyone and in other areas to persons who have consented to jurisdiction of Shari'a courts plus all Muslims); States not under Shari'a law: 14 years' imprisonment
- Gender identity: No
- Military: No
- Discrimination protections: Limited for education

Family rights
- Recognition of relationships: No recognition of same-sex unions
- Restrictions: "The Same-Sex Marriage Prohibition Act" criminalises all forms of same-sex unions
- Adoption: No

Lesbian, gay, bisexual, transgender or queer (LGBTQ) persons in Northern Nigeria face severe challenges not experienced by non-LGBTQ residents. Federal law prohibits all forms of homosexual activities and prescribes up to 14 years imprisonment for those found culpable. While the Maliki form of Shari'a law applied in 12 states has less severe penalty for unmarried persons, it prescribes the death penalty for married individuals.

Nigeria has been widely criticized by human and civil rights organizations, as well as the United Nations, for failing to uphold, and even violating, the rights of LGBTQ people.

== Legality of same-sex sexual activity ==
=== Federal Penal Code ===
Section 284 of the Penal Code of Northern Nigeria, Federal Provisions Act, which applies to all states in northern Nigeria, provides that:

Whoever has carnal intercourse against the order of nature with any man, woman or animal shall be punished with imprisonment for a term which may extend to fourteen years and shall also be liable to fine.

Section 405 provides that a male person who dresses or is attired in the fashion of a woman in a public place or who practises sodomy as a means of livelihood or as a profession is a "vagabond". Under Section 407, the punishment is a maximum of one year's imprisonment or a fine, or both.

Section 405 also provides that an "incorrigible vagabond" is "any person who after being convicted as a vagabond commits any of the offences which will render him liable to be convicted as such again". The punishment under Section 408 is a maximum of two years' imprisonment or a fine, or both.

=== Shari'a law applied in 12 states ===
Twelve northern states have adopted some form of Shari'a into their criminal statutes: Bauchi, Borno, Gombe, Jigawa, Kaduna, Kano, Katsina, Kebbi, Niger, Sokoto, Yobe, and Zamfara. The Shari'a criminal laws apply to those who voluntarily consent to the jurisdiction of the Shari'a courts and to all Muslims.

==== Meaning of sodomy ====
In the states of Kaduna and Yobe, "sodomy" is committed by "[w]hoever has anal coitus with any man".

In the states of Kano and Katsina, "sodomy" is committed by "[w]hoever has carnal intercourse against the order of nature with any man or woman through her rectum".

In the states of Bauchi, Gombe, Jigawa, Sokoto, and Zamfara, "sodomy" is committed by "[w]hoever has carnal intercourse against the order of nature with any man or woman".

==== Punishment for offense of sodomy ====
In the states of Gombe, Jigawa, and Zamfara, a person who commits the offence of sodomy shall be punished:

(a) with caning of one hundred lashes if unmarried, and shall also be liable to imprisonment for the term of one year; or (b) if married with stoning to death (rajm).

In the state of Kano, a person who commits the offence of sodomy shall be punished:

(a) with caning of one hundred lashes if unmarried, and shall also be liable to imprisonment for the term of one year; or (b) if married or has been previously married with stoning to death (rajm).

In the state of Bauchi, a person who commits the offence of sodomy "shall be punished with stoning to death (rajm) or by any other means decided by the state".

In the states of Kaduna, Katsina, Kebbi, and Yobe, a person who commits the offence of sodomy "shall be punished with stoning to death (rajm)".

In the state of Sokoto, a person who commits the offence of sodomy shall be punished:

(a) with stoning to death; (b) if the act is committed by a minor on an adult person the adult person shall be punished by way of ta'azir which may extend to 100 lashes and minor with correctional punishment.

In Sokoto, "ta'azir" means "a discretionary punishment for offence whose punishment is not specified".

==== Meaning of lesbianism ====
In the states of Bauchi, Gombe, Jigawa, Kaduna, Kano, Katsina, Kebbi, Sokoto, Yobe, and Zamfara, lesbianism is committed by "[w]hoever, being a woman, engages another woman in carnal intercourse through her sexual organ or by means of stimulation or sexual excitement of one another." Bauchi, Jigawa, Katsina, Kebbi, Sokoto, Yobe and Zamfara states include the following official explanation: "The offence is committed by the unnatural fusion of the female sexual organs and/or by the use of natural or artificial means to stimulate or attain sexual satisfaction or excitement."

==== Punishment for offence of lesbianism ====
In the states of Gombe, Jigawa, Kebbi, Sokoto, Yobe, and Zamfara, a person who commits the offence of lesbianism "shall be punished with caning which may extend to fifty lashes and in addition be sentenced to a term of imprisonment which may extend to six months".

In the states of Bauchi and Borno, a person who commits the offence of lesbianism "shall be punished with caning which may extend to fifty lashes and in addition be sentenced to a term of imprisonment which may extend to up to five years".

In the state of Kaduna, the punishment for committing the offence of lesbianism is ta'azir, which means "any punishment not provided for by way of hadd or qisas". "Hadd" means "punishment that is fixed by Islamic law". "Qisas" includes "punishments inflicted upon offenders by way of retaliation for causing death/injuries to a person".

In the states of Kano and Katsina, the punishment for committing the offence of lesbianism is stoning to death.

==== Meaning of gross indecency ====
In the state of Kaduna, a person commits an act of gross indecency "in public, exposure of nakedness in public and other related acts of similar nature capable of corrupting public morals".

In the states of Kano, Katsina, and Borno a person commits an act of gross indecency "by way of kissing in public, exposure of nakedness in public and other related acts of similar nature in order to corrupt public morals".

In the state of Gombe, a person commits an act of gross indecency by committing "any sexual offence against the normal or usual standards of behaviour".

The states of Bauchi, Jigawa, Kebbi, Sokoto, Yobe, and Zamfara do not define gross indecency. Their laws instead say: "Whoever commits an act of gross indecency upon the person of another without his consent or by the use of force or threat compels a person to join with him in the commission of such act shall be punished".

==== Punishment for offence of gross indecency ====
A person who commits the offence of gross indecency "shall be punished with caning which may extend to forty lashes and may be liable to imprisonment for a term not exceeding one year and may also be liable to fine".

In the state of Bauchi, a person who commits the offence of gross indecency "shall be punished with caning which may extend to forty lashes and may be liable to imprisonment for a term not exceeding seven years and may also be liable to fine".

In the state of Kaduna, the punishment for committing the offence of gross indecency is ta'azir, which means "any punishment not provided for by way of hadd or qisas". "Hadd" means "punishment that is fixed by Islamic law". "Qisas" includes "punishments inflicted upon offenders by way of retaliation for causing death/injuries to a person".

In the state of Sokoto, a person who commits the offence of gross indecency "shall be punished with caning which may extend to forty lashes or may be liable to imprisonment for a term not exceeding one year, or both, and may also be liable to fine".

==== Meanings of vagabond and incorrigible vagabond ====
In the states of Bauchi, Gombe, Jigawa, Kaduna, Kano, Katsina, Kebbi, Sokoto, Yobe, and Zamfara, "any male person who dresses or is attired in the fashion of a woman in a public place or who practises sodomy as a means of livelihood or as a profession" is a vagabond.

In the states of Kano and Katsina, "any female person who dresses or is attired in the fashion of a man in a public place" is a vagabond.

In the states of Bauchi, Gombe, Jigawa, Kaduna, Kano, Katsina, Kebbi, Sokoto, Yobe, and Zamfara, an "incorrigible vagabond" is "any person who after being convicted as a vagabond commits any of the offences which will render him liable to be convicted as such again".

==== Punishment for being a vagabond or incorrigible vagabond ====
In the states of Bauchi, Gombe, Jigawa, Katsina, Kebbi, Sokoto, Yobe, and Zamfara, "[w}hoever is convicted as being a vagabond shall be punished with imprisonment for a term which may extend to one year and shall be liable to caning which may extend to thirty lashes".

In the state of Kano, "[w}hoever is convicted as being a vagabond shall be punished with imprisonment for a term which may extend to eight months and shall be liable to caning which may extend to thirty-five lashes".

In the state of Kaduna, the punishment for being convicted as a vagabond is ta'azir, which means "any punishment not provided for by way of hadd or qisas". "Hadd" means "punishment that is fixed by Islamic law". "Qisas" includes "punishments inflicted upon offenders by way of retaliation for causing death/injuries to a person".

In the states of Gombe, Jigawa, Katsina, Kebbi, Sokoto, Yobe, and Zamfara, "[w]hoever is convicted as being an incorrigible vagabond shall be punished with imprisonment for a term which may extend to two years and shall be liable to caning which may extend to fifty lashes".

In the state of Bauchi, "[w]hoever is convicted as being an incorrigible vagabond shall be punished with imprisonment for a term which may extend to two years and shall be liable to caning which may extend to forty lashes".

In the state of Kano, "[w]hoever is convicted as being an incorrigible vagabond shall be punished with imprisonment for a term which may extend to one year and shall be liable to caning which may extend to fifty lashes".

In the state of Kaduna, the punishment for being convicted as an incorrigible vagabond is ta'azir.

=== Secular criminal law enacted by certain northern states ===
==== Same-sex sexual activities ====
In the state of Borno, a person who "engages in ... lesbianism, homosexual act ... in the State commits an offence". A person who "engages in sexual intercourse with another person of the same gender shall upon conviction be punished with death".

==== Males imitating the behavioural attitudes of women ====
In the state of Kano, a person who "being a male gender who acts, behaves or dresses in a manner which imitate the behavioural attitude of women shall be guilty of an offence and upon conviction, be sentenced to 1 year imprisonment or a fine of N10,000 or both".

== Recognition of same-sex unions ==
An attempt by the administration of President Olusegun Obasanjo to outlaw same sex relations in January 2007 failed to pass.

On 13 January 2014, The president of Nigeria, Goodluck Jonathan signed into law the Same Sex Marriage (Prohibition) Act 2013, which the National Assembly passed in May 2013.

== Anti-discrimination protections ==
Although the Constitution of the Federal Republic of Nigeria does not specifically protect LGBTQ rights, it does contain various provisions guaranteeing all citizens equal rights (Section 17(2)(a)) as well as other rights, including adequate medical and health care (Section 17(3)(d)) and equal opportunity in the workplace (Section 17(3)(a)).

The Federal Ministry of Education in Nigeria has a national policy in all Nigerian schools on safety, security and violence-free schools, which prohibits and disapproves of discrimination, which according to the policy, means, "Any unfair treatment or arbitrary distinction based on a person’s race, sex, religion, nationality, ethnic origin, sexual orientation, disability, age, language, social origin or other status."

At present, LGBTQ persons face discrimination and harassment.

== Summary table ==
Same-sex sexual activity legal	No / No (Up to death penalty in 12 states)
Equal age of consent	No
Anti-discrimination laws in employment only	No
Anti-discrimination laws in the provision of goods and services	No
Anti-discrimination laws in all other areas (Incl. indirect discrimination, hate speech)	No / Yes Limited (education only).
Same-sex marriages	No
Recognition of same-sex couples	No
Step-child adoption by same-sex couples	No
Joint adoption by same-sex couples	No
Gays and lesbians allowed to serve openly in the military	No
Right to change legal gender	No
Access to IVF for lesbians	No
Commercial surrogacy for gay male couples	No

== See also ==
- LGBTQ rights in Africa
- LGBTQ rights in Nigeria
- Recognition of same-sex unions in Nigeria
- Capital punishment for homosexuality
- Capital punishment in Nigeria
- Yan Daudu
