= Kito (slang) =

Nigeria LGBTQ slang

Kito is a slang term used in Nigeria to refer to the act of extorting money or other valuables from gay men by threatening to expose or out them to their families, friends, or community. It is a form of homophobic violence that is often used to control and intimidate gay men.

== History ==
The term kito is thought to have originated in the Hausa language of northern Nigeria. It is believed to be a contraction of the words "ka sha kunya" which means "you should be ashamed".

In 2014, the Same-Sex Marriage Prohibition Act was passed, which criminalizes same-sex marriage and other forms of same-sex intimacy. However, this law has been criticized for being discriminatory and for exposing gay people to violence.

In a 2018 survey by the Human Rights Watch, 73% of gay men in Nigeria said they had been threatened with kito. 31% said they had actually been extorted money or other valuables.

In a 2026 survey conducted by the Bisi Alimi Foundation, 45.9% of respondents reported experiencing Kito violence. The survey highlighted provisions of Nigeria's criminal law on violence against persons to argue against the phenomenon.

== Effects ==
Kito is often carried out by gangs of young men. The gangs will often target gay men in public places, such as parks or bars. They may follow the victim and then confront them, threatening to expose them if they do not pay up.

Kito can have a devastating impact on the victims. It can lead to depression, anxiety, and post-traumatic stress disorder. It can also make it difficult for victims to come out to their families and friends, or to access essential services such as healthcare.

In 2018, the Nigerian police launched a campaign against kito. The campaign included public awareness raising and training for police officers on how to handle cases of kito.

In 2026, the Improved Sexual Health and Rights Advocacy Initiative (ISHRAI), a sexual minority and gender-diverse organisation, launched a campaign in collaboration with AmplifyChange to address the rising incidence of Kito violence in South-West Nigeria.

== Controversy ==
In 2026, a Big Brother Naija housemate, Yusuf, said in a conversation with another housemate that when he was in debt, he downloaded a gay dating app to set up gay men and rob them. LGBTIQ+ activists, including Bisi Alimi, took to social media to call him out and demand his arrest over his admission of committing Kito.

== Kito Cases in Nigeria ==
- Abuja Area Mama
- Hilary Emereole
- William Fubara
