= Obioma Chukwuike =

Nigerian intersex human-rights activist

- Citizenship: Nigerian
- Education: Enugu State University of Science and Technology, Federal University of Technology
- Occupation: Human rights activist
- Organization: Intersex Nigeria
- Known for: Intersex rights advocacy
- Website: https://intersexnigeria.org

Obioma Chukwuike is a Nigerian intersex and non-binary human rights activist and environmental specialist. They are the founder and executive director of Intersex Nigeria, an organisation advocating for bodily autonomy, protection from non-consensual medical interventions, and the inclusion of intersex people in national health policies.

== Education ==
Chukwuike holds Bachelor's degrees in Geography and Meteorology from Enugu State University of Science and Technology, and a Master of Science in Environmental Technology from the Federal University of Technology, Owerri.

== Activism and career ==
Chukwuike leads Intersex Nigeria as the organisation's executive director and has spoken on the invisibility of intersex people in national sexual and reproductive health policies, legal and political exclusion, and the continued social marginalisation and non-consensual medical interventions of intersex children and adults in Nigeria. In 2023, Intersex Nigeria contributed to a coalition statement on the human rights situation of LGBTQI+ persons in Nigeria at the United Nations Human Rights Council's Universal Periodic Review Pre-Session, addressing intersex-specific concerns including non-consensual medical interventions. Intersex Nigeria, legally registered as Center for Healthcare Development and Youth Empowerment was formed in 2019 to advocate for the rights and wellbeing of intersex people in Nigeria.

== Advocacy and public positions ==
Chukwuike argues that binary conceptions of sex have contributed to systemic discrimination, exclusion from healthcare systems, and violations of the bodily autonomy of intersex persons in Nigeria. They advocated for the inclusion of intersex people in national policy frameworks and health systems, the prohibition of medical interventions on intersex infants and minors, and the implementation of the African Commission on Human and Peoples’ Rights Resolution 552 on the protection of intersex persons through their organisation.

== Personal life ==
Chukwuike identifies as an intersex and non-binary person, using the pronouns they/them. Chuckwuike has said, "I did not enjoy my childhood. All the conversations around me were about how can we fix Obioma’s body and at one point I stopped talking to my family to find peace with myself. [...] I got healed. I forgive myself and I forgive my family. That is what activism did for me."

== See also ==
- Intersex human rights
- LGBT rights in Nigeria
- Universal Periodic Review
