= Dare Odumuye =

Nigerian LGBT activist

- Born: Dare Odumuye; Bodija, Ibadan
- Died: 2007
- Occupation: Activist

Dare Odumuye was a Nigerian LGBTQ rights activist, former executive director of Alliance Rights Nigeria, and one of the foremost sexual rights activist from Nigeria. He was a 2004 Ashoka fellow and a respected member of the gay community in Nigeria.

== Work ==
Dare founded Alliance Rights Nigeria in 1999, giving a face to what many believed is an alien concept. To the community of gay men and women across Nigeria, this became a rallying point.

At great cost to his life and safety, Dare began to organise and succeeded in bringing homosexuality into the public consciousness. He used facts about realities from the community to advocate for public acceptance of homosexuality and the need to direct prevention efforts on sexually transmitted diseases to benefit the community. At the same time he implemented direct training to prevent the spread of HIV amongst the community, having himself tested positive to the disease in 2001.

It was to Dare's credit that the National AIDS and STD Control Program was able to include the category “men sleeping with men” in all its studies, by being able to show the importance of the gay community to all programs for public health given their interaction and intersection with the general population.

Odumuye inspired a new generation of gay activists instilling in them the zeal to fight for their rights and their rightful place in Nigeria. He also targeted the media and policymakers with education to ensure greater understanding of the effects of homophobia. He inspired confidence and self-esteem in many gay men he mentored. Many LGBTQ advocacy groups in Nigeria today were founded or headed by his mentees.
