= Bisi Alimi =

British-Nigerian LGBT activist (born 1975)

- Bisi Alimi during Day 1 of the Queering Wiki 2026 Conference in Montreal, Canada
- Born: Ademola Iyandade Ojo Kazeem Alimi; 17 January 1975 (age 51); Lagos, Nigeria
- Education: Eko Boys High School; University of Lagos; Birkbeck College, University of London; Meyler Campbell
- Known for: First Nigerian to openly declare his sexuality on national television
- Notable work: Men Can't be Feminist; The Development Cost of Homophobia; If you say being gay is not African, you don’t know your history; We will lose the battle against HIV without LGBT decriminalisation
- Title: Executive Director, Wikimedia LGBT+
- Term: 2025–present
- Spouse: Anthony Davis (m. 2016)
- Awards: Attitude Pride Awards (2024)
- Website: bisialimi.com

Adebisi Ademola Alimi ( born 17 January 1975), known as Bisi Alimi, is a British-Nigerian gay rights activist, public speaker, blog writer, filmmaker and HIV/LGBT advocate who gained international attention when he became the first Nigerian to come out on television.

== Early life and education ==
Alimi was born and raised in Lagos. Bisi graduated from Eko Boys' High School in 1993. He has a Bachelor of Arts in theatre from University of Lagos. During his university education, the university's magazine outed him as a gay man. Prior to the magazine outing, Bisi had experienced much discrimination within the campus, including facing a disciplinary committee on the accusation of his gay status. Although he did graduate, he was almost denied his certificate as it was believed that his morals were unacceptable for an alumnus of the university.

He was admitted at Birkbeck College, University of London in 2011, where he earned his master's degree in Global Governance and Public Policy.

In 2019, he was offered the John Stopford Scholarship to study Masters in Executive Coaching at Meyler Campbell Coaching School.

== Career and activism ==
=== Early work in Nigeria ===
Alimi began his advocacy career in the late 1990s in Nigeria when a number of his friends died from HIV/AIDS. After two years of community mobilization work (including condom distribution and safe-sex education) for gay men and men who have sex with men (MSM) in Nigeria, he joined the Alliance Rights Nigeria (ARN) in 2002 as a Programme Director, developing and providing HIV/AIDS and sexual health services and support. In his capacity as ARN Programme Director, he was at the heart of developing the Nigerian MSM HIV prevention framework in 2004. He was trained by the International AIDS Alliance in 2004 as an HIV project designer, Community Mobiliser, Care, Support and Treatment.

In early 2004, Alimi attended the 4th National Conference on HIV/AIDS held in Abuja where he voiced HIV concerns amongst Nigerian gay men. He was later to become a Nigerian gay rights activist, leading several peaceful protests and social dialogues to demand acceptance of homosexuals in Nigeria.

Alimi publicly disclosed his HIV-positive status in 2004 during a televised interview on New Dawn with Funmi, hosted by Funmi Iyanda, becoming one of the first Nigerians to do so.

=== Television appearance and after-effects ===
Alimi gained notoriety in 2004 when he became the first Nigerian gay man to appear on Nigerian national television as a guest on Funmi Iyanda's show New Dawn with Funmi, a talk show on the NTA. That same year, Bisi had been diagnosed with HIV, and on the show Alimi confirmed his sexuality as a homosexual and asked for social acceptance from the public. His decision to come out of the closet generated both admiration and death threats. Consequently, Alimi was disowned by his family and most of his friends – including some in the gay community – and ejected from his home. Also, New Dawn's live format was cancelled. Future guests on the pre-recorded version were screened by NTA executive producers to avoid what was considered "causing public offence".

His controversial interview on national television in 2004 became the catalyst for the proposed motion on "Anti-Same Sex Bill" of 2006 that was presented to lawmakers in the Nigerian National Assembly. The motion for this controversial "Anti-Same Sex" bill was presented before the legislative house three times between 2006 and 2011.

In 2005, Alimi co-founded The Independent Project (later, The Initiative for Equal Rights) with a group of friends. He served as executive director of this organization where he pioneered several Nigerian LGBT Youth Group initiatives until April 2007. He also worked as director of Nigeria youth programmes at Alliance Rights organization.

In 2007, Alimi was forced to flee Nigeria following threats to his life. He was granted asylum in 2008 by the UK, where he has been resident since. On 8 December 2014, he was conferred with British citizenship.

=== Work in the United Kingdom ===
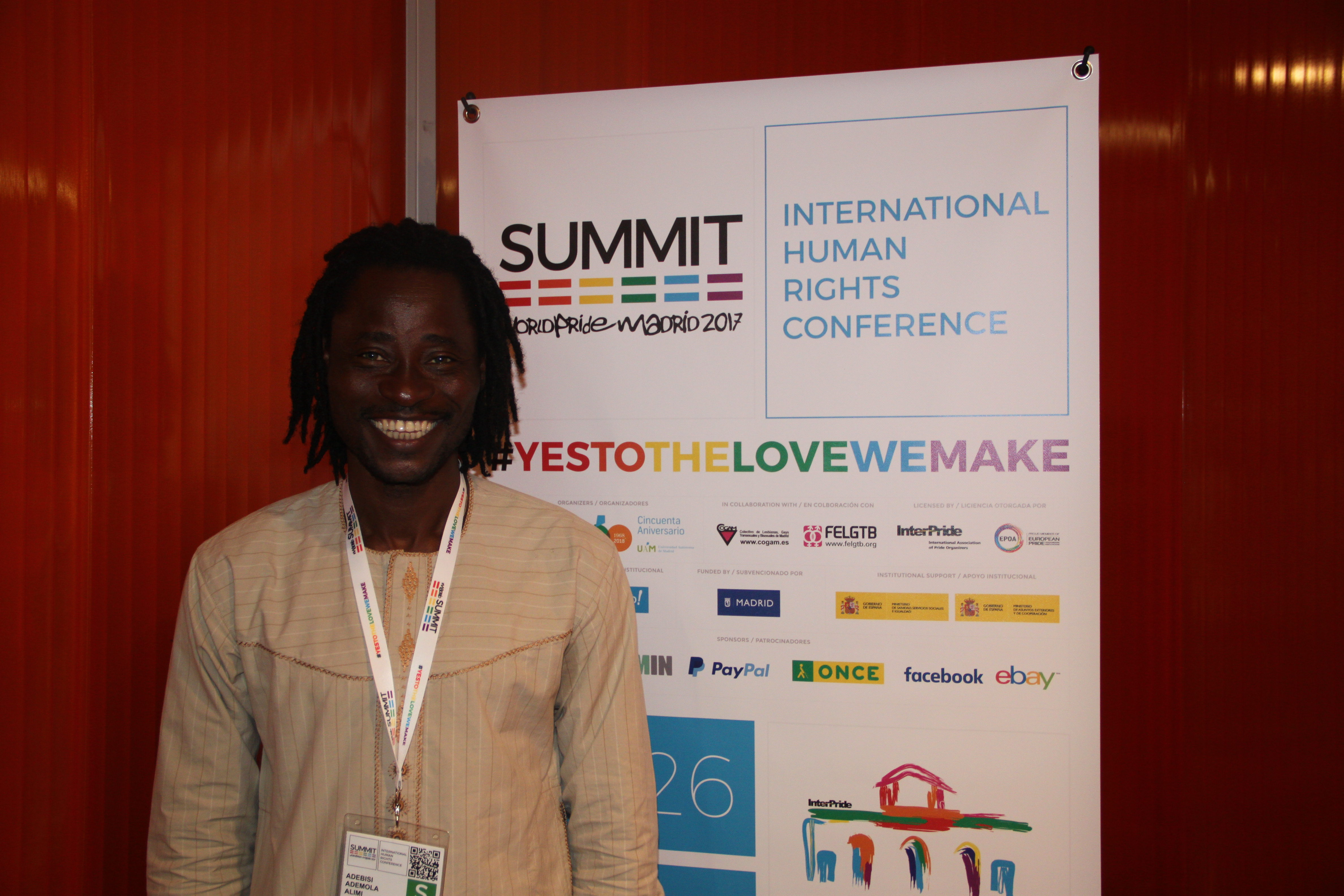
Alimi at the WorldPride Madrid summit

In London, Alimi continued his advocacy on gay rights within migrant African communities. He has worked for organizations in the UK including Naz Project London, Michael Bell Research and Consultancy, and HIV i-Base. He has also worked with AHPN, and he was selected a member of the IAS youth for Mexico 2008 and was a member of the AmfAR review panel for the international grants for African MSM AIDS initiative 2009 and 2011 respectively.

From 2007 to 2011, Alimi worked as African MSM Project Co-ordinator at Naz Project London. Alimi is a co-founder and director of Rainbow Intersection, as well as co-founder of the Kaleidoscope Trust for which he served as Director for Africa from 2012 to 2013. He has been a visiting lecturer at Freie Universitat Berlin and Humboldt University of Berlin.

Apart from sexual rights advocacy, Alimi has also organised protests against UK policies that are capable of inciting racial prejudice.

In 2015, Alimi founded the Bisi Alimi Foundation (BAF), registered in England and Wales, but operating in Nigeria as a result of the Same Sex Marriage Prohibition Act 2013. Its goal is to accelerate social acceptance for LGBT in Nigeria. He is the executive director of the foundation.

In 2024, he resigned as the Executive Director of the Bisi Alimi Foundation after 10 years of service. Judith Airiohuodion was appointed as the new Director.

In 2025, Alimi was appointed as the executive director of Wikimedia LGBT+, becoming the organisation's first executive director.

== Awards ==
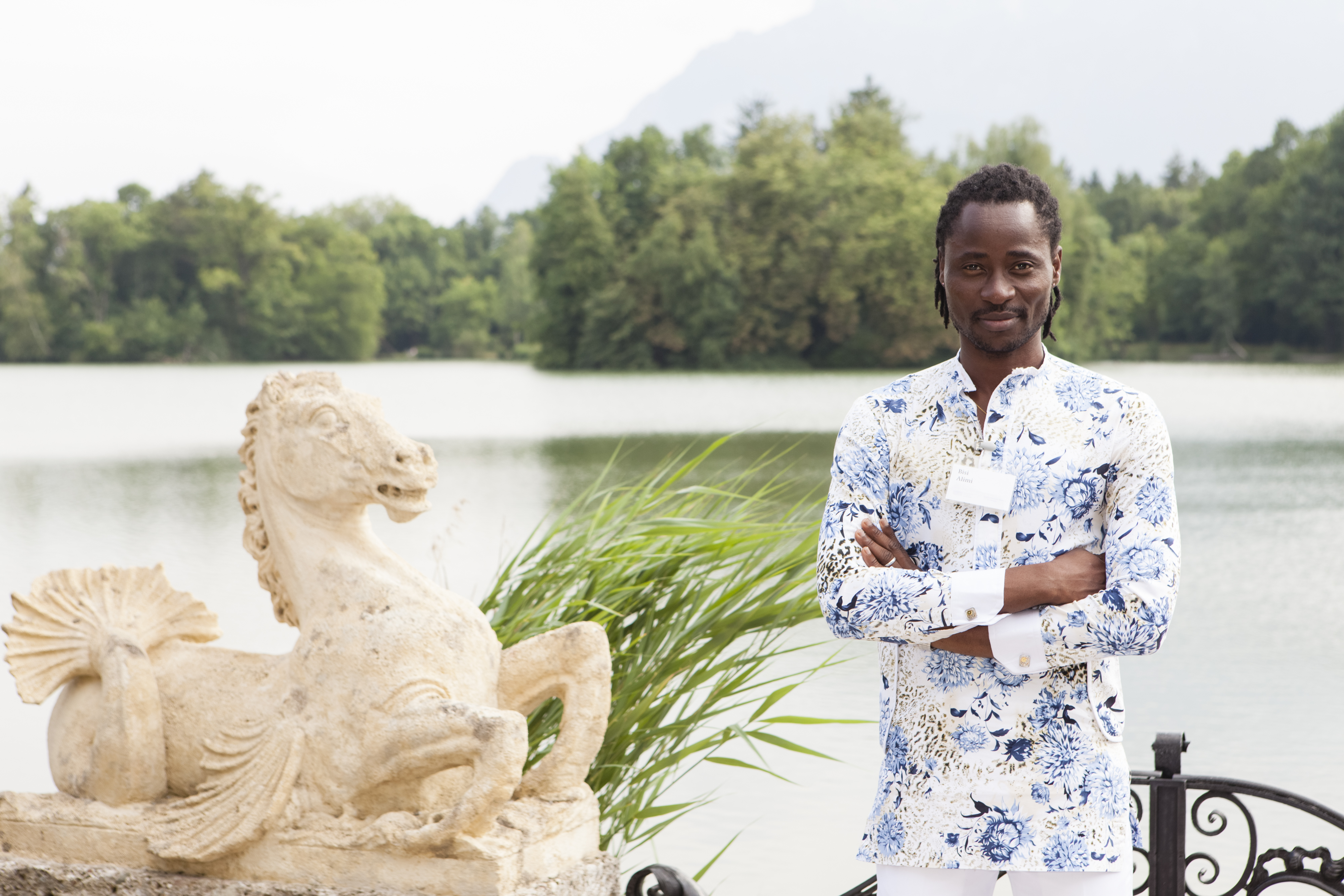
Alimi at the Salzburg Global Seminar

Alimi is a recipient of and nominee for several awards. He has also been included in the "Independent on Sunday" Pink List of most influential LGBT people in Britain in 2011, 2012, 2013, peaking at number 90 in 2012.

He was listed third on the 100 most influential Non White Atheist and Free thinkers in Britain and Northern Ireland.

On New Year's Day, 2014, he was added to The Gay UK LGBT 2014 Honour List in recognition of his exemplary work for 'Education in the LGBT Community' and he has been nominated for the "Out In The City" magazine's Diversity Champion of the Year Award.

Due to his progressive activism, he was awarded Campaigner of the Year at the European Diversity Awards in 2016 for his work as an LGBT+ activist. In December 2024, he was honored with an Attitude Pride Award by Attitude Magazine UK, reflecting his commitment to LGBT+ representation.

In 2026, at the Filmjoint Awards, an annual merit-based ceremony recognizing excellence in short films, Bisi Alimi won Best Picture in a non-voting category alongside his co-production partner, Lanre Njoku. Shall We Meet Tonight which led the nominations with ten nods, is a lesbian short film directed by Wapah Ezeigwe and produced by Vengiance Productions. The film features performances by Goodness Emmanuel, Jasperwills Ebuka, and Uzoamaka Onuoha.

== Presentations and publications ==
Alimi has used public lectures as means of voicing out the economic, health, legal and socio-cultural concerns of LGBTQ+ persons in the African continent. Between 2014 and 2016, he was a visiting lecturer at Freie University and Humboldt University in Berlin, where he taught "Pre and Post-Colonial Sexual Orientation and Gender Identity in Africa". His TEDx talk, "There should never be another Ibrahim" has been listed as one of the 14 most inspiring QUEER TEDtalks of all time. Alimi gave the closing speech at the Daily Beast event hosted at the New York Public Library titled, “I am Bisi Alimi and I am not a victim."

He has written many controversial opinion pieces, including "Men can't be Feminist", "I am no longer talking to Black Africans about Race", and "Why It’s So Dangerous To Pretend That Racism Doesn’t Exist". "The Development Cost of Homophobia" is his most successful article that was translated into over 15 languages globally. His article for the Guardian, "If you say being gay is not African, you don’t know your history", has been cited in many news articles and journals globally. His collection of poems includes: "a note to my father”, "The answer is always there”, and his published poem "I told them a tale”. In 2016, he wrote an article for National Public Radio (NPR) on the Orlando shooting titled, I Feel Like 'I Am Orlando', Though I Live Thousands of Miles Away.

== Selected Works ==
- The Development Costs of Homophobia
- I Feel Like 'I Am Orlando' Though I Live Thousands Of Miles Away
- “I’m One Bullet Away From Being A Hashtag” - #BlackLivesMatter activist Bisi Alimi
- I am no longer talking to Black Africans about Race
- Men Can't Be Feminists
- If you say being gay is not African, you don’t know your history

== See also ==
- Dare Odumuye
- Bobrisky
- Denrele Edun
- Yinka Jegede-Ekpe
