= LGBTQ rights in Nigeria =

- Nigeria
- Legal status: Illegal since 1904 (Northern Region only; as Northern Nigeria Protectorate); Illegal since 1916 (Region-wide; as Colony and Protectorate of Nigeria)
- Penalty: Up to 14 years imprisonment under federal law. States under Shari'a law: from lashing or caning up to death penalty. (Applies in Boko Haram/ISIL run areas to everyone and in other areas to persons who have consented to jurisdiction of Shari'a courts plus all Muslims).
- Gender identity: No
- Military: No
- Discrimination protections: Limited protections on education.

Family rights
- Recognition of relationships: No recognition of same-sex unions
- Restrictions: "The Same-Sex Marriage Prohibition Act" criminalises all forms of same-sex unions
- Adoption: No

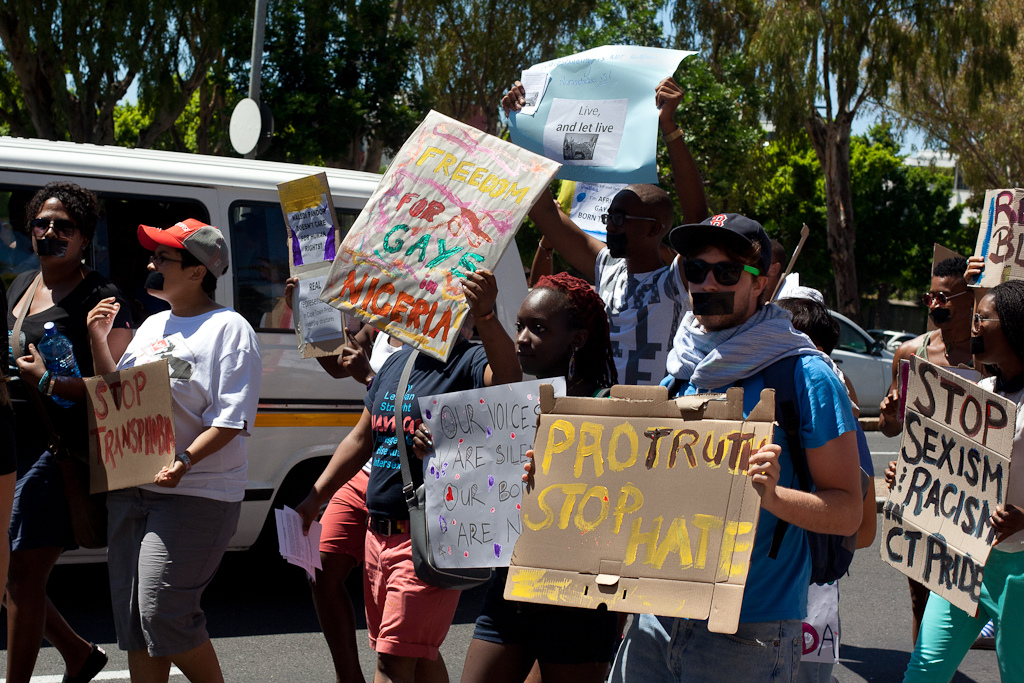
Cape Town Pride 2014 participants protested in support of LGBT rights in Nigeria.

People in the lesbian, gay, bisexual, transgender, and queer (LGBTQ) community in Nigeria face severe challenges. Both male and female expressions of homosexuality are illegal in Nigeria and punishable by death in the northern portion of the country and up to 14 years of imprisonment in the southern portion of the country. There are no legal protections for LGBTQ people in Nigeria—a largely conservative country of more than 230 million people, split between a mainly Muslim north and a mainly Christian south. Very few LGBTQ people are open about their sexuality, as violence against them is frequent. According to PinkNews, Nigerian authorities generally target the LGBTQ community. Many LGBTQ Nigerians seek asylum in countries with progressive laws.

Attempted same-sex marriages have also been criminalised within Nigeria since 2013, enacted via the Same Sex Marriage (Prohibition) Act 2013. The maximum punishment in 12 northern states with Shari'a law is death by stoning. The law applies to all Muslims and those who have voluntarily consented to the jurisdiction of the Shari'a courts. However, in southern Nigeria and under the secular criminal laws of northern Nigeria, the maximum punishment for same-sex sexual activity is 14 years of imprisonment, which is less severe. In 2022, a group of Nigerian human rights organizations and activists filed a lawsuit arguing that Sections 4(1), 5(2), and 5(3) of the Same-Sex Marriage (Prohibition) Act 2013 violated provisions of the Nigerian Constitution. That same year, the court ruled that these sections were unconstitutional and could not be enforced in any part of the country, effectively allowing LGBTQ+ organizations and individuals to exist and organize freely.

== Attitudes ==
According to the 2007 Pew Global Attitudes Project, 97% of Nigerian residents believe that homosexuality is a way of life that society should not accept, which was the third-highest rate of non-acceptance in the 45 countries surveyed. In 2015, a survey by an organisation founded by Bisi Alimi, a Nigerian homosexual activist, and based in London claimed this percentage decreased to 94%. In this survey, as of the same period, 30% of Nigerians agree that LGBTQ persons should receive education, healthcare, and housing. The level of disapproval declined slightly to 91% in another Pew Research Center poll in 2019.

In 2006, Philip Alston, the United Nations Special Rapporteur on extrajudicial, summary or arbitrary executions, delivered an oral statement to the Human Rights Council. To this, Joseph Ayalogu, the Nigerian ambassador to the UN, countered that "homosexuality and lesbianism " are "serious offences and odious conduct", that capital punishment is "appropriate and just punishment," and that those who believe executions are "excessive" are "judgemental rather than objective".

LGBTQ violence targeted at gay men and trans women is rampant in the country. It is called Kito, a process in which these individuals are lured into traps and blackmailed for being gay. The Kito scheme often involves extortion, outing, and physical harm. In recent times, organizations such as Minority Watch Nigeria have been advocating for legal protections for individuals facing such discrimination.

== Legality of same-sex sexual activity ==
Same-sex sexual activity is criminalized throughout Nigeria under various laws, including federal and state codes. Punishments range from imprisonment to capital punishment in some northern states governed by Shari'a law. This legal framework reflects a combination of colonial-era laws, Islamic jurisprudence, and local statutes, creating a restrictive environment for LGBTQ+ individuals in Nigeria.

=== Federal laws ===
- In southern Nigeria, the Nigerian Criminal Code criminalizes sex acts between men with penalties up to 14 years' imprisonment. Gross indecency between men is punishable by up to 3 years in prison. Furthermore, individuals or organizations supporting the rights of LGBTI individuals can face a 10-year sentence under this legislation.
- Section 214 of the penal code: This law criminalizes "carnal knowledge against the order of nature", which is interpreted to include same-sex sexual activity.
- Section 217 of the criminal code: This law criminalizes "gross indecency" which is also interpreted to include same-sex sexual activity.
- In northern Nigeria, the Penal Code prohibits "carnal intercourse against the order of nature" for men and women, punishable by up to 14 years' imprisonment, a fine, or both.

=== Shari'a law in northern states ===
- Twelve northern states implement Shari'a-based criminal laws applying to Muslims and those who consent to Shari'a court jurisdiction.
- Sodomy and lesbianism are severely punished, with penalties ranging from 100 lashes to death by stoning, depending on marital status and location.
- Lesbianism is defined as carnal acts or stimulation between women, punishable by imprisonment or caning in most states, with death penalties applied in Kano and Katsina.

=== Other religious groups ===
Religion holds profound influence in Nigeria, with Islam and Christianity being the predominant faiths, and a multitude of indigenous belief systems also contributing to the spiritual landscape. Religious practices and rituals are deeply embedded in various aspects of Nigerian society, and religious institutions often play crucial roles in education, healthcare, and social welfare.

Religion exerts a profound influence on the experiences of the LGBTQ community in Nigeria. Nigerian interpretations of Islam and Christianity often adhere to traditional views on sexuality and gender roles. This has led to the stigmatization of and discrimination against the LGBTQ community.

=== Other criminalized behaviors ===
- Cross-dressing and "imitating the opposite gender" are penalized in some states. For example, Kano imposes up to one year in prison or a fine for men who dress or behave as women.
- Being labeled a "vagabond" or "incorrigible vagabond" for engaging in same-sex acts or cross-dressing carries punishments of imprisonment, caning, or fines.

=== History ===
The Nigeria Police Force, established in the 18th century in Nigeria during the British colonial era, has been labeled as corrupt and repressive. There are reports of police officers profiling people whom they deem as gay leading to arrests, assaults, and extortion.

The law criminalizing homosexuality is based on a British colonial-era law that was introduced to Nigeria in the 19th century. Prior to colonization, there was no single law criminalizing same-sex sexual activity in Nigeria. However, there were cultural taboos against same-sex relationships in some parts of the country. The British colonial government introduced laws that criminalized same-sex sexual activity, based on the British criminal code, which had been influenced by Victorian morality. The most notable of these laws was the Criminal Code Act of 1916, which made it a crime for "any person who has carnal knowledge of any person against the order of nature". These laws were retained after Nigeria gained independence in 1960, becoming part of the Nigerian Criminal Code.

Colonialism and religion have impacted LGBTQ rights in Nigeria, which are generally infringed upon. These laws were retained after Nigeria gained independence in 1960. In recent years there have been some calls and protests for the repeal of these laws, but they remain in place.

== Recognition of same-sex relationships ==
Public opinion on same-sex marriage (2023) based on Pew Research Center
1. Strongly favor (1.00%)
2. Somewhat favor (1.00%)
3. Not sure (1.00%)
4. Somewhat oppose (5.00%)
5. Strongly oppose (92.0%)

On 18 January 2007, the cabinet of Nigeria approved the Same Sex Marriage (Prohibition) Act 2006 and sent it to the National Assembly for urgent action. The bill, however, did not pass. (Note: The bill would have: provided that "only marriage entered into between a man and a woman under the marriage Act or under the Islamic and Customary Laws are valid and recognized in Nigeria"; made void in Nigeria any "marriage entered into by persons of same sex pursuant to a license issued by another state, country, foreign jurisdiction or otherwise"; prohibited the issuance of a marriage license to persons of the same sex; prohibited recognition in Nigeria of "[m]arriage between persons of same sex entered into in any jurisdiction whether within or outside Nigeria, any other state or country or otherwise or any other location or relationships between persons of the same sex which are treated as marriage in any jurisdiction, whether within or outside Nigeria"; required "[a]ll arms of government and agencies in the Federal Republic of Nigeria ... [to] not give effect to any public act, record or judicial proceeding within or outside Nigeria, with regard to same sex marriage or relationship or a claim arising from such marriage or relationship"; provided that all "contractual or other rights granted to persons involved in same sex marriage or accruing to such persons by virtue of a license shall be unenforceable in any Court of law in Nigeria"; denied the courts of Nigeria the "jurisdiction to grant a divorce, separation and maintenance orders with regard to such same sex marriage, consider or rule on any of their rights arising from or in connection with such marriage"; prohibited the celebration of same sex marriage "in any place of worship by any recognized cleric of a Mosque, Church, denomination or body to which such place of worship belongs"; imposed up to five years' imprisonment for anyone who "goes through the ceremony of marriage with a person of the same sex" or "performs, witnesses, aids, or abets the ceremony of same sex marriage"; imposed up to five years' imprisonment for anyone who "is involved in the registration of gay clubs, societies and organizations"; prohibited "[p]ublicity, procession[,] and public show of same-sex amorous relationship through the electronic or print media physically, directly, indirectly or otherwise"; made same sex couples ineligible to adopt children)

On 29 November 2011, the Senate of Nigeria passed the "Same Sex Marriage (Prohibition) Bill, 2011". The bill was passed on 30 May 2013 by the House of Representatives of Nigeria and signed into law by President Goodluck Jonathan in January 2014 as the Same-Sex Marriage Prohibition Act. The law:

- made a marriage contract or civil union entered into between persons of the same sex "invalid and illegal and ... not recognized as entitled to the benefits of a valid marriage"
- made void and unenforceable in Nigeria a marriage contract or civil union entered into between persons of the same sex by virtue of a certificate issued by a foreign country
- prohibited the solemnization of any marriage or civil union entered into between persons of the same sex "in any place of worship either Church or Mosque or any other place or whatsoever called in Nigeria"
- prohibited the registration of "gay clubs, societies and organisations, their sustenance, processions and meetings"
- prohibited the "public show of same sex amorous relationship directly or indirectly"
- made a person who enters into a same sex marriage contract or civil union liable for 14 years' imprisonment
- made a person who "registers, operates or participates in gay clubs, societies and organisations, or directly or indirectly make public show of same sex amorous relationship in Nigeria" liable for 10 years' imprisonment
- made a person or group of persons that "witness, abet and aids the solemnization of a same sex marriage or civil union, or supports the registration, operation and sustenance of gay clubs, societies, organisations, processions or meetings in Nigeria" liable for 10 years' imprisonment
- defined "civil union" for purposes of this law to mean "any arrangement between persons of the same sex to live together as sex partners, and ... include such descriptions as adult independent relationships, caring partnerships, civil partnerships, civil solidarity pacts, domestic partnerships, reciprocal beneficiary relationships, registered partnerships, significant relationships, stable unions, etc."

The law follows a similar one passed in Uganda in December 2013, which imposes life imprisonment for some types of homosexual acts.

== Anti-discrimination protections ==
The Constitution of the Federal Republic of Nigeria does not specifically protect LGBTQ rights, but it does contain various provisions that is suppposed to guarantee all citizens equal rights (Section 17(2)(a)) as well as other rights, including adequate medical and health care (Section 17(3)(d)) and equal opportunity in the workplace (Section 17(3)(a)).

Likewise, the Nigerian Supreme Court ruled that Sections 4(1), 5(2), and 5(3) of the Same-Sex Marriage (Prohibition) Act 2013 violated the Nigerian Constitution, allowing LGBTQ+ organizations and individuals to exist and organize freely.

The Federal Ministry of Education in Nigeria has a national policy in all Nigerian schools on safety, security and violence-free schools, which prohibits and disapproves of discrimination, which according to the policy, means, "Any unfair treatment or arbitrary distinction based on a person’s race, sex, religion, nationality, ethnic origin, sexual orientation, disability, age, language, social origin or other status."

There is no enacted legislation explicitly protecting against discrimination or harassment based on sexual orientation or gender identity. None of the political parties in Nigeria has formally endorsed LGBTQ rights. Two of the most successful political parties in the National Assembly, the People's Democratic Party and the All Nigeria Peoples Party, are overtly hostile to LGBTQ rights. Smaller, more liberal political parties have also spoken against LGBTQ rights.

== Living conditions ==
Nigeria is considered a conservative country. Religion holds profound importance in Nigeria, with Islam and Christianity being the predominant faiths, and mainstream Nigerian interpretations of Islam and Christianity adhere to traditional views on sexuality and gender roles. There is demonstrated public hostility towards same-sex relationships. In addition to legal punishment, openly homosexual citizens are subject to public aggression and violence.

Since the enactment of Nigeria's Same-Sex Marriage Prohibition Act (SSMPA) in 2014, LGBTQ individuals have faced intensified harassment, violence, and social exclusion. Blackmailers, neighbors, and law enforcement officers frequently exploit the law to target LGBTQ people, often using social media to entrap victims. The act of extorting money from gay men by threatening to out them is known as "kito". Arrests and public humiliation are common, and many individuals fear seeking medical care or reporting crimes. There are reports of police officers profiling people whom they deem as gay, leading to arrests, assaults, and extortion. Further experiences of queer women in Nigeria have been documented in the book, She Called Me Woman, edited by Azeenarh Mohammed, Chitra Nagarajan and Rafeeat Aliya.

While Western advocacy, particularly by the United States, has provided financial support for LGBTQ rights in Nigeria and other African countries, critics argue that these efforts have often had unintended consequences. The visibility of LGBTQ individuals has increased, prompting backlash from conservative factions who see the movement as a form of cultural imperialism. Some Nigerian activists suggest that discreet, locally driven advocacy is a more effective approach to improving conditions for LGBTQ communities.

The law has also deepened stigma, with many Nigerians associating LGBTQ identities with foreign influence. Activists and rights groups have reported that the SSMPA has emboldened vigilantes and fostered a climate of impunity for anti-LGBTQ violence. Despite these challenges, organizations such as The Initiative For Equal Rights continue to provide essential support and advocacy for LGBTQ Nigerians. Though Lagos Fashion Week is held twice yearly in public, some fashion labels choose to hold only private showings to prevent accusations of immorality or to avoid last-minute cancellations by hosts amid negative attention.

Estimates of the homosexual population in the country have ranged from fifteen to twenty million. Studies have found that the majority of LGBTQ Nigerians identify as Christian in denominations such as Anglicanism.

Some organizations in Nigeria try to assist LGBTQ persons, such as the Metropolitan Community Churches. Affiliation with these groups may place individuals at risk of violence or abuse.

The U.S. Department of State's 2011 Human Rights Report found:

Because of widespread societal taboos against homosexuality, very few persons openly revealed their orientation. The [non-governmental organizations] ... Global Rights and The Independent Project provided lesbian, gay, bisexual, and transgender (LGBT) groups with legal advice and training in advocacy, media responsibility, and HIV/AIDS awareness.

== Arrests and incidents ==
In August 2007, eighteen men were arrested by Bauchi state police and charged with sodomy for dressing as women, which is illegal under Shari'a penal code. These charges were later dropped to vagrancy, and the men were held in jail for several years waiting for trial — which eventually dissolved by the end of 2011.

On 12 September 2008, four newspapers published the names and addresses of twelve members of the House of rainbow Metropolitan Church, an LGBTQ-friendly church in Lagos. Some of these members were threatened, beaten and stoned by members of the public. Following these incidents the church cancelled conferences for concerns about the safety of attendees.

On 15 April 2017, authorities in the state of Kaduna arrested 53 men for allegedly conspiring to attend a same-sex wedding. The accused were charged with conspiracy, unlawful assembly, and belonging to an unlawful society.

Lagos State arrested 42 men for homosexuality in August 2017.

In June 2018, the Nigerian police arrested more than 100 party-goers at a hotel in Asaba, Delta State, on charges that they were gays and lesbians. By July 2018, they were facing homosexuality-related charges in court.

A birthday party held in a hotel in Egbeda, a suburban community in Lagos Nigeria, in August 2018, was interrupted by a police raid that led to the arrest of everyone the police could round up from the hotel's environs. 57 of the young men arrested during the raid were alleged to be having an initiation into the LGBTQ community. Among the victims was James Brown, a Nigerian crossdresser who become popularly known with the Nigerian slang "They Didnt Caught Me". The Egbeda 57 case held attention of the nation and that of the LGBTQ community in Nigeria for two years.

In January 2019, Dolapo Badmos, the spokesperson for the Lagos State Police Command, warned homosexuals to flee the country or face prosecution. She stated in an Instagram post: "Any persons that are homosexually orientated should leave Nigeria or risk facing prosecution." Dolapo Badmos continues to state that there are laws in Nigeria that forbid homosexual clubs, associations and organisations where anyone found to be associated with these could be penalised up to 15 years in jail.

In August 2023, police raided a gay wedding in Warri in Delta state and arrested dozens of people. Known as the Warri 67, this case of mass arrest took place at supposed gay party/marriage ceremony at a hotel in Warri, a suburban city in Delta state, Southern Nigeria. The victims of the raids were said to be counted in 100s. However, 67 of them charged to court for trial. The police in a statement following the arrest said they acted based on tipped information from undisclosed source about a marriage ceremony that was taking place in a private hotel. The raid however raised eyebrows from human right observers and the internal community, as the party was a private one and the organizers are supposed to be accorded their right to privacy.

In October 2023, 76 people (59 men and 17 women) were arrested at a gay party in Gombe state in northern Nigeria where police said a gay wedding was to be held. Known as the Gombe 76, the raid and arrest were carried out by members of the Nigerian Security and Civil Defense Corp. The security operatives in a realized statement said the arrest was made following a tip-off on a same-sex birthday party and a planned marriage in the state capital. The security personnel alleged 21 of the victims had confessed to be gay. The arrest was, however, criticized by Amnesty International.

In September 2026, the Jigawa State Hisbah arrested eight men over alleged homosexual practices following a complaint by a 22-year-old man in Kazaure Local Government Area of the state. He alleged that nine individuals had sex with him and that he subsequently contracted HIV. According to Hisbah, eight of the men arraigned men admitted to the act, while one remains at large.

In October 2026, the Oyo State Police Command arrested three men in Saki ,Oyo State over an alleged homosexuality. The suspects were identified as Ayomide Lukeman, Shuaib Aremu and Abdul-Rasheed Mufeed. The first two were 22 years old, while the third was 23. The report confirmed that the sexual encounter was consensual. The incident is another example of the numerous arrests of individuals over consensual same-sex relationships in Nigeria.

== Asylum seekers ==
The enforcement of Nigeria's Same-Sex Marriage Prohibition Act has not only criminalized same-sex unions but also prohibited LGBTQ advocacy, gatherings, and public expressions of affection. This legislation has forced many LGBTQ Nigerians to seek asylum abroad, including in the United States. Asylum seekers often cite fears of violence, ostracism, and legal repercussions under both secular and Shari'a laws. Activists have also highlighted the significant health and economic consequences of the law, as it hampers access to HIV prevention services and forces LGBTQ individuals and allies to abandon their work in community health and education.

Organizations such as Housing Works in Brooklyn provide vital support for LGBTQ asylum seekers from Nigeria, assisting with legal representation, housing, and access to medical care. Asylum seekers face challenges even after fleeing Nigeria, including the trauma of displacement, societal stigma, and concern for family members who remain at risk back home. For some, the opportunity to live openly is tempered by ongoing fears of being targeted or exposing their loved ones to harm.

== Summary table ==
Same-sex sexual activity legal	No / No (Penalty: Up to death in Shari'a states; up to 14 years of imprisonment in non-Shari'a states)
Equal age of consent	No
Anti-discrimination laws in employment only	No
Anti-discrimination laws in the provision of goods and services	No
Anti-discrimination laws in all other areas (Incl. indirect discrimination, hate speech)	No / Yes Limited in the case of education.
Same-sex marriages	No (Statutory ban since 2013)
Recognition of same-sex couples	No
Step-child adoption by same-sex couples	No
Joint adoption by same-sex couples	No
Gays and lesbians allowed to serve openly in the military	No
Right to change legal gender	No Crossdressing is illegal in 12 states in Northern Nigeria.
Access to IVF for lesbians	No
Commercial surrogacy for gay male couples	No
MSMs allowed to donate blood	No

== See also ==
- All the Colours of the World Are Between Black and White, Nigerian film (2023)
- Abuja Area Mama, a cross-dresser murdered in Abuja
- Bobrisky, a prominent transgender woman in Nigeria
- Capital punishment for homosexuality
- Capital punishment in Nigeria
- Human rights in Nigeria
- LGBT rights in Africa
- LGBT rights in Northern Nigeria
- Recognition of same-sex unions in Nigeria
- Same Sex Marriage (Prohibition) Act 2013
- The Initiative For Equal Rights, an LGBTQ advocacy group in Nigeria
- Obioma Chukwuike, organizer of Intersex Nigeria
