= Recognition of same-sex unions in Nigeria =

Nigeria does not recognize same-sex marriages or civil unions. Homosexuality among men is punishable by up to 14 years' imprisonment in southern parts of Nigeria, while it is punishable by death in northern parts of the country under Sharia law. Individuals who "perform, witness, aid or abet" a same-sex marriage may face severe penalties.

== Legal history ==
=== Same Sex Marriage (Prohibition) Act 2013 ===
==== Legislative action ====
On January 18, 2007, the Federal Executive Council proposed a bill prohibiting same-sex marriages and urged the National Assembly to pass it urgently. According to the Minister of Justice, Bayo Ojo, the bill was pushed by President Olusegun Obasanjo following the International Conference on AIDS and Sexually Transmitted Infections in Africa (ICASA) in Abuja in 2005. The bill would have prescribed five years' imprisonment for anyone who "undergoes, performs, witnesses, aids, or abets" a same-sex marriage. It would have also prohibited any display of a "same-sex amorous relationship" and adoption of children by gays or lesbians. The bill received little to no opposition in Parliament. It would have also provided for five years' imprisonment for involvement in public advocacy or associations supporting the rights of LGBT people, including a ban on any form of relationship with a gay person. In February 2006, the United States Department of State condemned the bill. In March 2006, 16 international human rights groups signed a joint letter condemning the law, calling it a violation of freedoms of expression, association and assembly guaranteed by international law and the African Charter on Human and Peoples' Rights, as well as a barrier to the struggle against HIV/AIDS. An estimated 3 million people live with HIV/AIDS in Nigeria. The bill was not passed before the 2007 elections.

A similar draft bill was proposed in 2013. It states: "A person who registers, operates or participates in gay clubs, societies or organizations, or directly or indirectly makes public show of same-sex amorous relationship in Nigeria commits an offense and is liable on conviction to a term of 10 years." It passed Parliament with little opposition, and was signed into law by President Goodluck Jonathan on January 7, 2014 as the Same Sex Marriage (Prohibition) Act 2013 (SSMPA). (Note: In some languages of Nigeria: Yoruba: Òfin (Ìfòfindè) Ìgbéyàwó Irú Ara Ẹni, 2013, pronounced [òfĩ̄ ìfòfĩ̄dè ìɡ͡bé.jàwó īrú ārā ɛ̄.nĩ̄]; Igbo: Nwoke Ịlụ Nwoke Na Nwaanyị Ịlụ Nwaanyị (Iwu Megidere Ha) Nke, 2013; Hausa: Auren Jinsi Guda (Haramci) Doka, 2013; Nigerian Pidgin: Law Wey Dem Make In 2013 Wey Block Marriage Between Man And Man, And Woman And Woman) The law voids marriage contracts between people of the same sex and bans persons from "aiding and abetting" same-sex marriages. Proponents of the legislation cited their Christian or Muslim faith to support the law, while critics contended that local cultures did not explicitly forbid same-sex marriages and relations.

==== Court challenge and arrests ====
Same-sex sexual activity legal Same-sex marriage Limited recognition (foreign residency rights) No recognition of same-sex couples Same-sex sexual activity illegal Prison but not enforced Prison Death penalty on books but not enforced Enforced death penalty

A case, Mr. Teriah Joseph Ebah v. Federal Republic of Nigeria, challenging the constitutionality of the law was dismissed by the Federal High Court in October 2014 for lack of standing. In 2018, several LGBT activists said that to their knowledge the law had not been used to convict anyone in any same-sex marriage-related case. According to the activists, this is because the law is "incoherent", and many cases involving suspected LGBT persons lack proper evidence, making it "impossible for prosecutors to present a winnable case and prove that any crime has been committed". Nevertheless, "because of this law, the police treat people in any way that they please. They torture, force people to confess, and when they hear about a gathering of men, they just head over to make arrests." In 2018, a group of 47 men were arrested in Lagos for allegedly being "initiated into a gay club". The men said they were attending a birthday party. This case was widely seen as a test case on whether the law could be used to prosecute. Judge Rilwan Aikawa of the Federal High Court dismissed the case for lack of evidence in October 2020. In October 2020, LGBT activists also used the End SARS protests in Nigeria to demand an end to marginalization of the LGBT community in Nigeria.

The Kano State Hisbah Corps arrested 12 young men in January 2015 in Kano on suspicion of planning a same-sex wedding. The men denied the charges, saying they were planning a friend's birthday party. Similarly, the police force arrested 11 young women in 2018 on charges of planning a lesbian wedding. The women denied the charges, saying they were celebrating the appointment of their dance club's president. In December 2022, 19 people were arrested on similar charges. None of these cases have resulted in a conviction. In August 2023, 69 people were arrested in Warri for allegedly participating in a same-sex marriage. The police livestreamed the arrest on their Facebook page, a practice the Federal High Court had ruled illegal in 2022. They were released on bail the following month. In October 2023, 76 people were arrested in Gombe on suspicion of planning a same-sex wedding. 25 people were arrested in Kano in October 2025.

=== State laws ===
In September 2025, Governor Abba Kabir Yusuf introduced legislation to the Kano State House of Assembly to explicitly ban same-sex marriages under state law. "Under no circumstance will we allow acts that contradict our religion and traditions to take root in Kano. This government is duty-bound to protect the moral integrity of our society", said Yusuf, who added that the bill would specifically ban same-sex marriage and enforce strict penalties on "immoral" practices, including liwadi (homosexuality) and madugo (lesbianism). Similar legislation was also proposed in Cross River, and passed its second reading in the Cross River State House of Assembly in July 2026.

== Historical and customary recognition ==
While many modern-day Nigeria cultures historically practiced polygamy, there are no records of same-sex marriages being performed in local cultures in the way they are commonly defined in Western legal systems. However, there is evidence for identities and behaviours that may be placed on the LGBT spectrum. For instance, an ìyá ṣàngó (Yoruba: [ì.já ʃã̀gó]) is a priestess of Shango, the deity of thunder and lightning in the Yoruba religion, who during trance possession is no longer viewed as a woman and is seen to marry Shango at the metaphysical level, becoming a man. Male ìyá ṣàngó would dress in "women's clothing, cosmetics, and jewelry and sport women's coiffures when they [were] going to be possessed". In Hausa culture, there are men who exhibit feminine traits and are sexually attracted or intimate with other men, known as ƴan daudu (Hausa: [j̰án dáudùː]). Discrimination against the ƴan daudu has increased in recent years, which they attribute to increased religiosity among the Hausa people. Among the Igbo, there are circumstances where a marriage between women is considered appropriate, such as when a woman has no child and her husband dies, and she takes a "wife" (Igbo: nwunye ọkpọrọ) to increase her economic status and perpetuate her inheritance and family lineage. Offspring from a female same-sex marriage (alụmalụ nwaanyị na nwaanyị) guarantee the female "husband" economic standing by "maintaining her rights to occupy property which is inherited by her children". Female same-sex marriages are also practiced among the Yoruba, Nupe and Ijaw, and predate the arrival of Roman Catholic and Anglican missionaries to Nigeria in the 19th century. However, this traditional practice has gradually disappeared due to the influence of Christian churches, and polling suggests that most women now disapprove of the institution.

== Religious performance ==
In December 2023, the Holy See published Fiducia supplicans, a declaration allowing Catholic priests to bless couples who are not considered to be married according to church teaching, including the blessing of same-sex couples. However, the Catholic Church in Nigeria criticized the declaration and many Nigerian clerics said they would not bless same-sex couples. The Catholic Bishops' Conference of Nigeria issued a statement on 20 December condemning the declaration and stating that "there is no possibility in the Church of blessing same-sex unions and activities. That would go against God's law, the teachings of the Church, the laws of our nation and the cultural sensibilities of our people."

The Church of Nigeria, part of the Anglican Communion, is staunchly opposed to same-sex marriage. It has been vocal in its opposition to decisions by other Anglican churches to bless same-sex unions or accept clergy in committed civil unions. It declared itself in "impaired communion" with the Episcopal Church of the United States on 21 November 2003 due to the ordination of a partnered gay man, Gene Robinson, as a bishop of the Diocese of New Hampshire. In 2005, Primate Peter Akinola criticised the Church of England for allowing clergy in same-sex civil partnerships, saying that "[it] proposes same-sex marriage 'in everything but name'". It also opposed the appointment of Sarah Mullally as Archbishop of Canterbury in October 2025. Primate Henry Ndukuba stated, "Bishop Sarah Mullally is a strong supporter of same-sex marriage as evidenced in her speech in 2023, after a vote to approve the blessings of homosexuals when she described the result as a 'moment of hope for the Church'", falsely claiming that Mullally supported same-sex marriage. Although Mullally has signalled support for greater "pastoral care and inclusion of LGBT+ people in the life of our church communities", she reiterated church teaching on marriage in 2018.

== Public opinion ==
Support for same-sex marriage among 18–21-year-olds according to a 2016 survey from the Varkey Foundation

A 2015 opinion poll conducted by NOIPolls in partnership with the Initiative for Equal Rights and the Bisi Alimi Foundation showed that 87% of Nigerians supported the Same Sex Marriage (Prohibition) Act 2013. However, support for same-sex marriage is higher among the younger generation. A September–October 2016 survey by the Varkey Foundation found that 16% of 18–21-year-olds supported same-sex marriage in Nigeria.

A Pew Research Center poll conducted between February and May 2023 showed that 2% of Nigerians supported same-sex marriage, 97% were opposed and 1% did not know or refused to answer. Christians (97%) and Muslims (98%) were equally likely to oppose same-sex marriage.

== See also ==
- LGBT rights in Nigeria
- Recognition of same-sex unions in Africa
- Gender roles and fluidity in indigenous Nigerian cultures
