= Bisi Alimi Foundation =

Foundation registered in England and Wales

- Formation: 2015
- Founder: Bisi Alimi
- Type: Non-governmental organization
- Legal status: Charity
- Headquarters: United Kingdom
- Website: bisialimifoundation.org

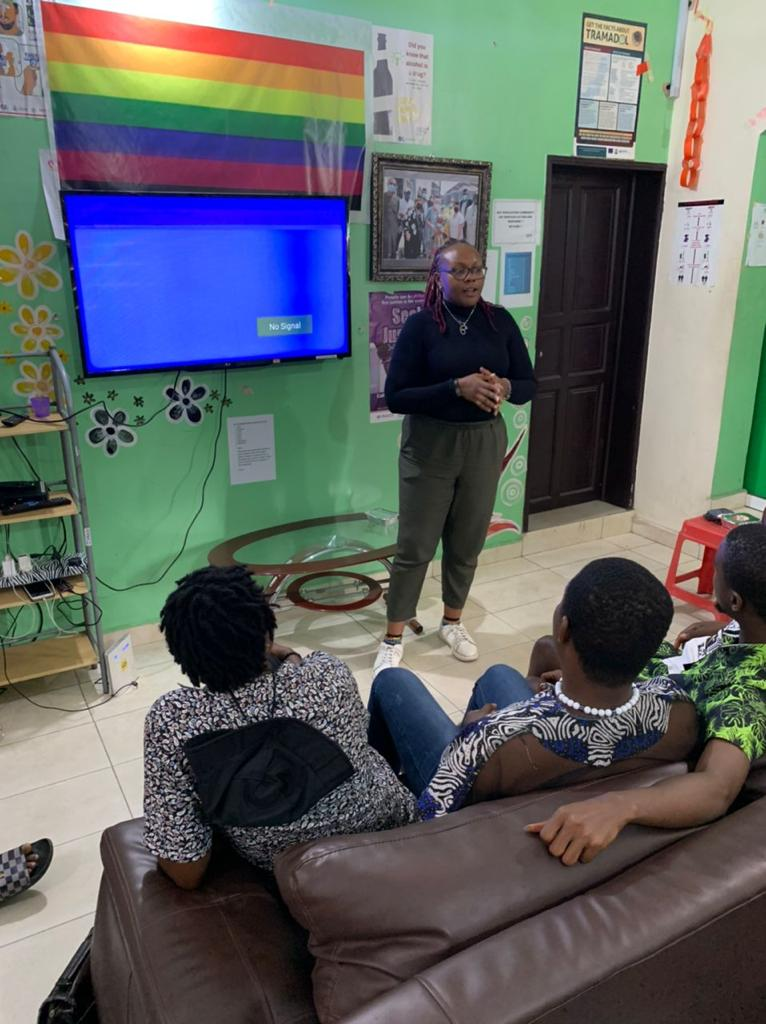
Gidauniyar Bisi Alimi

The Bisi Alimi Foundation (BAF) is a non-profit organization founded in 2015, and registered in England and Wales, but operating in Nigeria as a result of the Same Sex Marriage Prohibition Act 2013 (SSMPA). The foundation aspires to create a Nigeria in which everyone is treated equally, regardless of sexual orientation or gender identity.

Bisi Alimi is the founder and director of Bisi Alimi Foundation. In 2019 Bisi Alimi Foundation, in partnership with Elton John AIDS Foundation, organised a Gay Pride event in Nigeria; the event tagged “Night of Diversity 2019” held in Lagos, Tuesday 29 October 2019. In 2018 money from the Whitsun Tournament outreach campaign was allocated to Bisi Alimi Foundation. Whitsun Tournament Outreach campaign supports an LGBT organisation, movement or initiative abroad.

== Initiative(s) ==
The foundation organises a fellowship for young leaders known as the Rainbow Academy Fellowship, which equips young LGBTIQ+ leaders with skills in community organising, advocacy, and activism. The fellowship brings together queer people from across Nigeria, while the 2026 edition was specifically for those based in Lagos, Ogun, and Oyo states.
