= Same Sex Marriage (Prohibition) Act 2013 =

Law in Nigeria

National Assembly
- Long title: An Act to Make Provisions for the Prohibition of Relationship Between Persons of the Same Sex, Celebration of Marriage by Them, and for Other Matters Connected Therewith
- Territorial extent: Nigeria
- Passed: 17 December 2013
- Signed by: Goodluck Jonathan
- Signed: 7 January 2014
- Introduced by: Bayo Ojo (PDP)
- Voting summary: Unanimously voted for
- Status: Current legislation

The Act to Make Provisions for the Prohibition of Relationship Between Persons of the Same Sex, Celebration of Marriage by Them, and for Other Matters Connected Therewith, also known as the Same Sex (Prohibition) Act 2006, was a controversial draft bill that was first put before both houses of the National Assembly of Nigeria in early 2007. Seven years later, another draft was passed into legislation by president Goodluck Jonathan as the Same Sex Marriage (Prohibition) Act 2013 (SSMPA). The law restricts LGBTQ rights in Nigeria.

== Proposal in 2006-2007 ==
=== History ===
The bill was first placed before the National Assembly by Justice Minister Bayo Ojo on January 18, 2006, but it was not passed during the first reading. On January 18, 2007, the bill was approved by the Federal Executive Council and resent before the National Assembly. However, it was condemned by human rights organizations for its restrictions on freedom of speech and organization, potentially placing Nigeria at odds with several international agreements to which the country was signatory. It was also seen in Nigeria as being a last-ditch election-year effort of the Obasanjo administration to appeal to public sentiment, since the second reading of the bill was being pushed after the Senate's defeat of a bill to amend the Constitution's limit on the number of presidential terms. As a result, the bill was not passed by either house before the general election that year.

=== Summary ===
The proposed bill called for five years imprisonment for anyone who undergoes, "performs, witnesses, aids, or abets" a same-sex marriage. It would also prohibit any display of a "same-sex amorous relationship" and adoption of children by gays or lesbians. The bill was expected to receive little or no opposition in Parliament.

The bill also called for five years imprisonment for involvement in public advocacy or associations supporting the rights of lesbian and gay people. Included in the bill was a proposal to ban any form of relationship with a gay person. The intent of the bill was to ban anything associated with being gay in the country.

=== Domestic reaction ===
The overwhelming majority of Nigerians were in full support of this legislation as it reflected the desire of the people who do not see it as a fundamental human right issue.

Of the few dissenting voices, one of the staunchest domestic opponents of the legislation was Davis Mac-Iyalla, a homosexual Nigerian LGBT rights advocate who heads the Nigerian chapter of Changing Attitude, an Anglican pro-LGBT organization based in the United Kingdom. Mac-Iyalla, who was repeatedly arrested by Nigerian police in pro-LGBT demonstrations in previous years, was already an opponent of Peter Akinola, the then Anglican Primate of the Church of Nigeria.

=== International reaction ===
In February 2006, the United States State Department criticized the proposal. In March 2006, 16 international human rights groups signed a letter condemning the bill, calling it a violation of the freedoms of expression, association and assembly guaranteed by international law as well as by the African Charter on Human and Peoples' Rights as well as an obstacle to efforts to combat HIV/AIDS in Nigeria. Some sources claim that Nigeria has the world's third-largest population of persons with AIDS: 3.6 million Nigerians are infected with HIV. However, the Nigerian governmental organization responsible for HIV/AIDS control provides services specifically for homosexual patients through the Nigerian Diversities Network (NDN). NDN has a mission of working in partnership with all key stakeholders (including homosexual people) to significantly reduce the HIV/AIDS vulnerability. The NDN works closely with government departments through its offices in the national and state capitals.

== Legislation in 2014 ==
Despite international pressure, the Same Sex Marriage (Prohibition) Act 2013 was signed by President Goodluck Jonathan and dated January 7, 2014. US Secretary of State John Kerry said the United States is "deeply concerned" by a law that "dangerously restricts freedom of assembly, association, and expression for all Nigerians." Former coloniser Britain said, "The U.K. opposes any form of discrimination on the grounds of sexual orientation." Two months later, the ban on gay marriage in the United Kingdom was lifted.

The Nigerian law already had provisions making homosexual sex illegal. The 2013 Act adds to this, "A person who registers, operates or participates in gay clubs, societies or organizations, or directly or indirectly makes public show of same-sex amorous relationship in Nigeria commits an offense and is liable on conviction to a term of 10 years." The bill is widely supported in Nigeria. In a survey of the U.S. Pew Research Center in 2013, 98 percent of the Nigerian respondents said society should not accept homosexuality.

MassResistance and other American anti-LGBTQ organizations supported the passing of the bill.

=== Impact ===
Since the enactment of the law in 2014, LGBTQ individuals have faced intensified harassment, violence, and social exclusion. Blackmailers, neighbors, and law enforcement officers exploit the law to target LGBTQ people, often using social media to entrap victims (see kito). Arrests and public humiliation are common, and many individuals fear seeking medical care or reporting crimes. Activists and rights groups have reported that the SSMPA has emboldened vigilantes and fostered a climate of impunity for anti-LGBTQ violence.

In 2018, LGBTQ activists said that the law has never been used to convict anyone in homosexuality-related cases. This, they believe, is because the law is incoherent, and many cases involving suspected LGBTQ persons lack evidence. A programme officer with the Initiative for Equal Rights described the law as redundant.

A case against 47 men, including James Brown, was seen as a potential test for the law, but was dismissed in 2020 due to "lack of diligent prosecution". Many of the men who had been charged still experienced severe impacts on their lives due to the public arrest and case.

=== Proposed amendment against cross dressing ===
In 2022, the Nigerian House of Representatives introduced a bill to prohibit cross-dressing, as an amendment to the Same Sex Marriage (Prohibition) Act 2013. As of 2024, the bill had not become law.

=== Proposed same-sex marriage ban by Cross River State Assembly ===
In 2026, the Cross River State House of Assembly proposed a bill seeking to outlaw same-sex marriage and civil unions in the state. The bill, co-sponsored by Rt. Hon. Hilary Bisong, who represents Boki II State Constituency, and ten other lawmakers, has passed its second reading. It is titled, “A Bill for a Law to Prohibit Contract of Marriage or Civil Union Entered into Between Persons of Same Sex, Solemnization of Same, Whether Cultural or in Accordance with Any Statute in Existence, and for Matters Connected Therewith, 2026.”

The bill proposes to sanction anyone who contracts, facilitates, promotes, or aids same-sex marriage or marriage equality. A Nigerian lawyer has argued that the State Assembly lacks the constitutional power to legislate on the matter.

== See also ==
- LGBTQ rights in Nigeria
- Recognition of same-sex unions in Nigeria
- Anti-Homosexuality Act, 2014, a similar law in Uganda, later struck down
- Anti-Homosexuality Act, 2023, a similar current law in Uganda
