= Resistance literature =

Resistance literature includes but is not limited to fiction, cinema, drama, poetry, visual art, and song, reflecting the many forms of political resistance throughout history. Resistance literature and media actively resist oppression or oppressive systems in a creative manner. Resistance literature is one of the frameworks of art that allows movements to communicate and preserve stories of resistance.

== History of resistance literature ==
=== American Abolitionism ===
Poetry, newspapers, and songs were commonly used to try and increase enthusiasm and support for the abolitionist movement. In addition, some enslaved people published slave narratives which documented and spoke out about their firsthand experiences of being enslaved.

=== American Resistance to the Vietnam War ===
In the early '60s and into the '70s, Americans of many backgrounds were unified over a shared opposition to the Vietnam War. The most well-known demonstration for many is the Kent State University protest where four students were killed by the Ohio National Guard on May 4, 1970. Among the many forms of resistance during this time, the most enduring product of this movement is the United States voting age being lowered from 21 to 18 years of age.

=== Argentinian Resistance and The Mothers of the Plaza de Mayo ===
The Mothers of the Plaza de Mayo (Las Madres de la Plaza de Mayo) is an Argentinian human rights group that began demonstrating in 1977 in response to the National Reorganization Process of Jorge Rafael Videla's military dictatorship. They are a group of mothers and grandmothers whose initial goal was finding their disappeared family members, or desaparecidos, who were illegally abducted and detained by the Argininian regime and holding accountable those who were responsible. Their political resistance, which continues today, is characterized by both large demonstrations in front of the Casa Rosada presidential palace and various graffiti art exhibitions, which act as a public archive of this atrocity and a call to action in addressing current events. Subsequent photo art, films, poetry and memoirs have continued to commemorate the group's ongoing activism.

=== Literary Studies ===
In literary studies, resistance literature is one subfield in which to study literary output that may be understood as a socio-political activity to resist dominant ideologies. Resistance literature can be used to resist gender-based oppression, or to demonstrate difficulties in liberation struggles or writing in exile. Studying resistance literature is one way to challenge norms and defy culture practices that can, in some instances, give hope. Analyzing depictions of armed resistance in fields like political science or history can demonstrate how governmental and civil change occur, only literature also has a role to play. Barbara Harlow's book Resistance Literature (1987), which came to define this literary subfield, demonstrates how literary analysis and engagement can give rise to new conceptions of political resistance.

=== Weimar Republic Anti-fascist Resistance ===
Christopher Isherwood was a queer author who lived in Weimar Germany from 1929 to 1933, fleeing in '33 to escape Nazi Germany. During this period of time he wrote Goodbye to Berlin, a fictitious novel based on his experiences in Berlin. Goodbye to Berlin captures a small sliver of queer history within its pages, and also was highly influential in the New Objectivity art movement in Germany.

=== Southern U.S. Border Militarization ===
The Mexico-United States border is heavily policed in the United States, with some stretches of it including fences, walls, floodlights, and guards that became more common place after the introduction of "prevention through deterence" strategies in the 1990s. Arizona is one of the most dangerous places to cross the border due to the presence of the Sonoran Desert and conservative immigration laws. Groups like Beyond the Wall work to use art, such as puppetry, to explore positive cultural identities and combat negative stereotypes and narratives.

=== Women's Suffrage ===
Popular forms of art that were used during the Women's Suffrage Movement were banners, posters, postcards, and newspaper cartoons. In 1907 the Artists' Suffrage League was formed, founded by Mary Lowndes, a British stained-glass artist. By 1913, the ASP was forming a united front in America as well, supplying art to women's suffrage groups and aiding the spread of information.

=== Black Feminism ===
While Black feminist writings have been recorded as far back as the 1830s the first widely known Black feminist was Sojourner Truth who believed that race and gender could not be separated in discussions of oppression. Kimberlé Crenshaw would coin this term in an essay as intersectionality. Black feminism relies on three distinct principles: that Black women's experiences of classism, sexism and racism are all inextricably linked, that racism, sexism, and "all other -isms" need to addressed together, and that black women have different needs and worldviews than those of both white women and black men.

=== Iranian Revolution ===
Censorship and suppression of human rights during the Iranian Revolution (1978-1979) prompted the publication of novels and poems speaking about experiences of abuse and oppression. There has been a particular rise in Iranian women's literature addressing restrictive laws and social norms surrounding dress code, marriage, and the workforce. Many stories are written by Iranian women who grew up during the Shah and/or Khomeini regime but are now writing in exile, reflecting on their experiences and the impact these events continue to have on Iranian culture.

== Forms of resistance literature ==
Resistance can also be in the form of humour, bitching and gossip.

=== Archival Creation and Restoration ===
Archives can often be the site of recovered or restored pieces of history such as newspapers, zines, flyers, manuscripts, letters, photographs, bills, interviews (in conjunction with oral history), other documents, and digital resources. Archives naturally become a part of resistance literature because they reaffirm a person, people's, or events place in history and combats the narrative that only what is immediately documented, available, or institutionally produced is true. They've become a pivotal resource in keeping the memory of marginalized communities alive and are undoubtedly a piece of resistance literature.

=== Novel Writing ===
Throughout many periods of history, novels of fiction have been written by authors who lived through periods of resistance, and the power of these stories has brought positive social change. Some well-known examples of this include Upton Sinclair's 1906 novel The Jungle and The Grapes of Wrath by John Steinbeck, both of which resulted in more rights for the working class.

=== Theater ===
Since the beginning of Western civilization, plays have been used as a way to protest against social problems and reflect the social and political trends of society. For example, The San Francisco Mime Troupe was created to produce theater that exposes injustices through political satire in the form of plays and musicals.

=== Zine Making ===
Zines, short for magazine or fanzine, have been used to cheaply spread political views and information. Zines began in fan communities in the 1930s, but began to gain a political edge in the 1960s and 70s in punk communities when zines began to be easier to produce.

=== Photography ===
Throughout history, photography has been used to oppose war and violence, resist repressive regimes, and confront racism and the heteronormative patriarchy. Faye Schulman, a partisan photographer during World War II, is an example of someone using photography as a form of resistance.

=== Film ===
Historically, films have been used by directors as a means of resisting dominant narratives and histories in order to show opposition to war and violence, and as a means to promote international understanding. Modes of film, such as documentaries, have the ability to combine real world footage and people as a part of a performance or message to a larger group on resisting oppressive ideologies.

=== Concrete Poetry ===
Concrete poetry is a form of poetry which places particular emphasis on the visual imagery of the words' formation on the page. The meaning of the words may come second to or be enhanced by this typographic significance. Example of this can be found in M. NourbeSe Philip's Zong!, Alex Balgiu and Mónica de la Torre's anthology Women in Concrete Poetry 1959-1979, Alan Pelez Lopez's Intergalactic Travels: Poems from a Fugitive Alien, and much of the poetry of E.E. Cummings.

=== Music ===
Music has traditionally showcased simple, repetitive songs used in social movements or for inspiring collective calls to action. "Strange Fruit" by Billie Holiday (1939) is considered to be one of the first protest songs that breaks away from traditional styles, providing a dark, haunting commentary about lynchings in the United States.

== Writers, artists, and makers who resist ==
=== James Baldwin ===
James Baldwin (1924-1987) was an American writer and activist whose body of work includes If Beale Street Could Talk (1974), Sonny's Blues (1954), and Notes of a Native Son (1954). Through his plays, essays, short stories, and novels, Baldwin remains highly influential as his work often addressed race, sexuality, and morality. Baldwin was active in American movements for civil rights and gay liberation, and his legacy can be traced in contemporary writers and activists.

=== Alice Walker ===
Alice Walker (born February 9, 1944) is an American writer, poet, and activist who is known for her poetry, novels, and short stories – the most notable being The Color Purple. As a social activist, she became involved in the civil rights movement, considers herself a feminist, and coined the term womanist to mean a feminist of color or Black feminist in her 1983 collection In Search of Our Mother's Gardens: Womanist Prose.

=== Taylor K. Shaw ===
Taylor K Shaw is the co-founder of a coalition of BIPOC artists called Black Women Animate. She co-founded BWA Studios with JLove Calderón in 2017 in order to resist the underrepresentation of both women of color and nonbinary people behind the scenes of the animation industry.

=== Art Spiegelman ===
Art Spiegelman is an American cartoonist most famous for his book Maus. In it, he uses the narrative of his relationship with his father and his father's story of surviving the Holocaust to spread true information on the Holocaust and the generational trauma it has caused. It stands in defiance of Holocaust denial narratives.

=== Faye Schulman ===
Faye Schulman (November 1919 - April 2021) was a Jewish partisan resistance fighter during World War II. The wartime photos Schulman took documented the resistance to the Nazi regime in Eastern Europe, helping to prove that Jewish people did not go "like sheep to the slaughter."

=== Akwaeke Emezi ===
Akwaeke Emezi (born in 1987) is a Nigerian artist who engages video, performance, writing, and sculpture as mediums for their work and is well known for their debut autobiographical novel,Freshwater. They create art that reflects being an ogbanje and talk openly about the difficulties of gender dysphoria. Akwaeke is the recipient of a Stonewall Honor, a Walter Honor, and an Otherwise Award Honor for their debut YA novel, PET.

=== Toni Morrison ===
Toni Morrison (1931-2019) was a Black author who wrote her books specifically for a Black audience, making a point to resist the white gaze. Her body of work included The Bluest Eye (1970), Song of Solomon (1977) and Beloved (1987). She continued to resist dominant ideologies by focusing many of her books on women characters who engaged in violent acts of resistance and rebellion against their own victimization. She often focused on the social construction of race and its effect on the psyche.

=== Lorraine Hansberry ===
Lorraine Hansberry (May 19, 1930 – January 12, 1965) remains a prominent playwright and author within American literary history. Her play Raisin in the Sun is about an African American family aspiring to move beyond the segregation and disenfranchisement in 1950s Chicago. This work made her the first Black woman to have a play performed on Broadway. This play (and much of her other work) deals with these themes of aspirations for social progress and disagreement on how to achieve this. After her death, a broader selection of her writings was also produced on Broadway as To Be Young, Gifted and Black (the title popularized by Nina Simone's song by the same name). This text grapples with many of the same themes of raising a Black family in America while also integrating her own personal struggles as successful young playwright and a Black woman in America.

=== Marjane Satrapi ===
Marjane Satrapi (born in 1969) is an Iranian-born writer known for her graphic memoir Persepolis (2000) and subsequent film adaptation by the same name in 2007. The graphic novel describes Satrapi's childhood experiences as a rebellious, punk-rock teenager growing up in Tehran during the Iranian Revolution.
