= Content Warning: Everything =

2022 poetry collection

- Author: Akwaeke Emezi
- Language: English
- Genre: Poetry
- Publisher: Copper Canyon Press
- Publication date: 5 April 2022
- Publication place: Port Townsend, Washington
- Media type: Print, e-book
- Pages: 64
- ISBN: 9781556596292

Content Warning: Everything is a 2022 debut poetry collection by the Igbo-Tamil Nigerian writer Akwaeke Emezi. It was published by Copper Canyon Press and the collection explores themes of homelessness, survival, chosen family, and surrender.

== Plot ==
The poems are written from spirit-self perspectives and celebrate an essence of self that cannot be killed, drowned, or diminished. It draws on Igbo spirituality and Christian mythology and navigated through the concept of Ogbanje. The poetry is closely connected to Emezi's memoir, Dear Senthuran: A Black Spirit Memoir, and further explores Asughara, a central figure in their semi-autobiographical novel, Freshwater.

== Reception ==
Writing for Colorado Review, Robert Manaster described the collection's language as jolting and its lines as flowing effortlessly despite Emezi's sparse use of punctuation. He wrote, "Emezi's empowering voice never shies away from being themselves and taking responsibility as they reimagine this Catholic ritual..."

Jeevika Verma, writing for Adroit Journal, described Emezi's voice as revolutionary, while Keira Brown of SNACK Magazine observed that, "While the writing is sparse, it is stunningly selective, making you feel so much with so little."
