= Son of the Morning =

Son of the morning is an alternative name for Lucifer.

Son of the Morning may refer to:

- Son of the Morning (album), a 2009 album by Oh, Sleeper
- Son of the Morning (Oates novel), a 1978 novel by Joyce Carol Oates
- Son of the Morning (Emezi novel), a 2025 novel by Akwaeke Emezi
