= Changeling =

Creature in European folklore

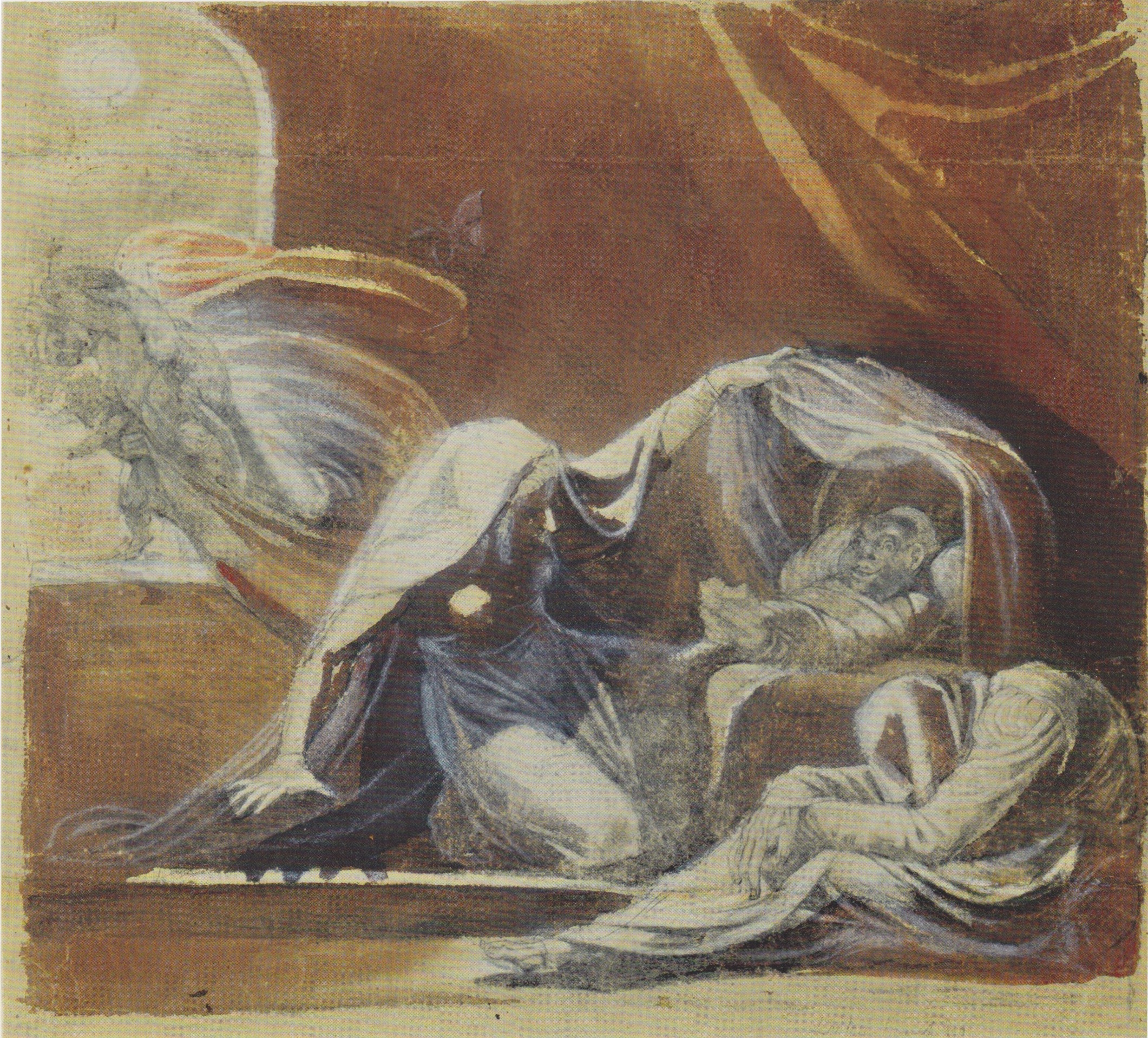
Der Wechselbalg by Henry Fuseli, 1781

A changeling, also historically referred to as an auf or oaf, is a human-like creature found throughout much of European folklore. According to folklore, a changeling was a substitute left by a supernatural being when kidnapping a human being. Although sometimes it was a "stock" (a piece of wood made magically to resemble the kidnapped human), more often the changeling was a supernatural being made magically to look like the kidnapped human.

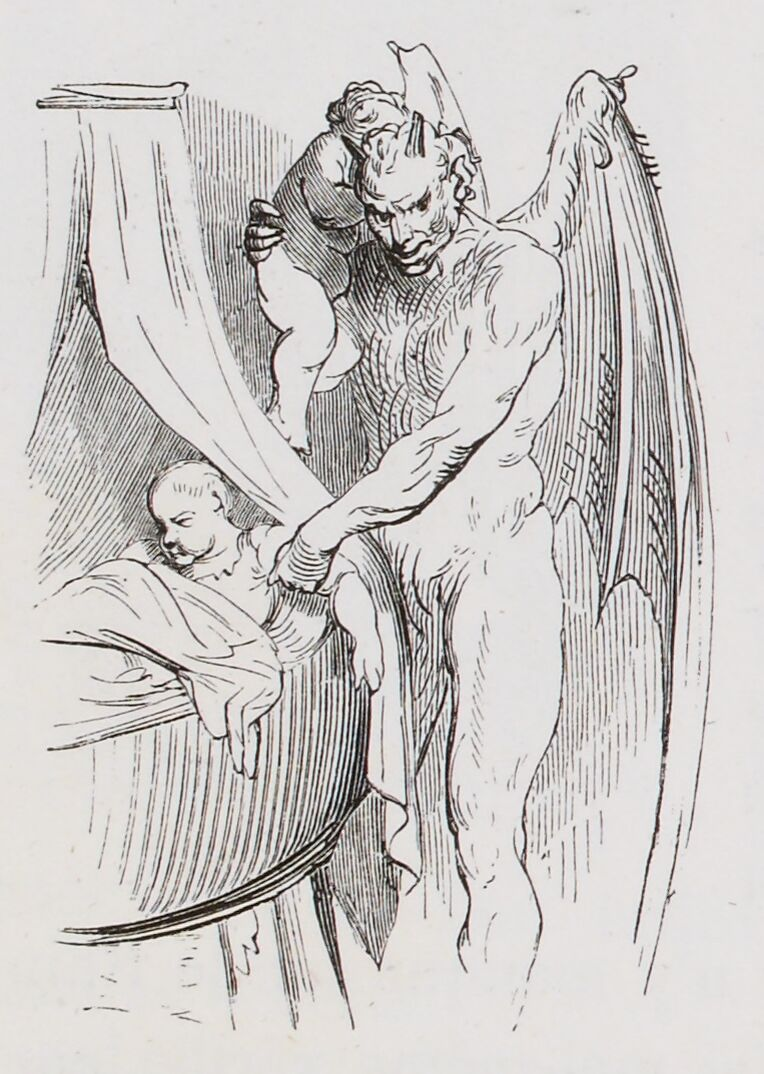
Devil swapping a child in crib with changeling called Killecroff ―Illustrated by Gustav Doré, Saintine (1862) Mythologie du Rhin

Supernatural beings blamed for stealing children included fairies, elves, demons, trolls, nereids and many others. Usually, the kidnapped human was a child; but there were cases, particularly in Scandinavia and Ireland, where adults were taken.

Some modern scholars have argued these stories of replaced children originated as folklore explanations for autism or other developmental conditions.

== Description ==
A changeling is typically identifiable via several traits, which vary from culture to culture.

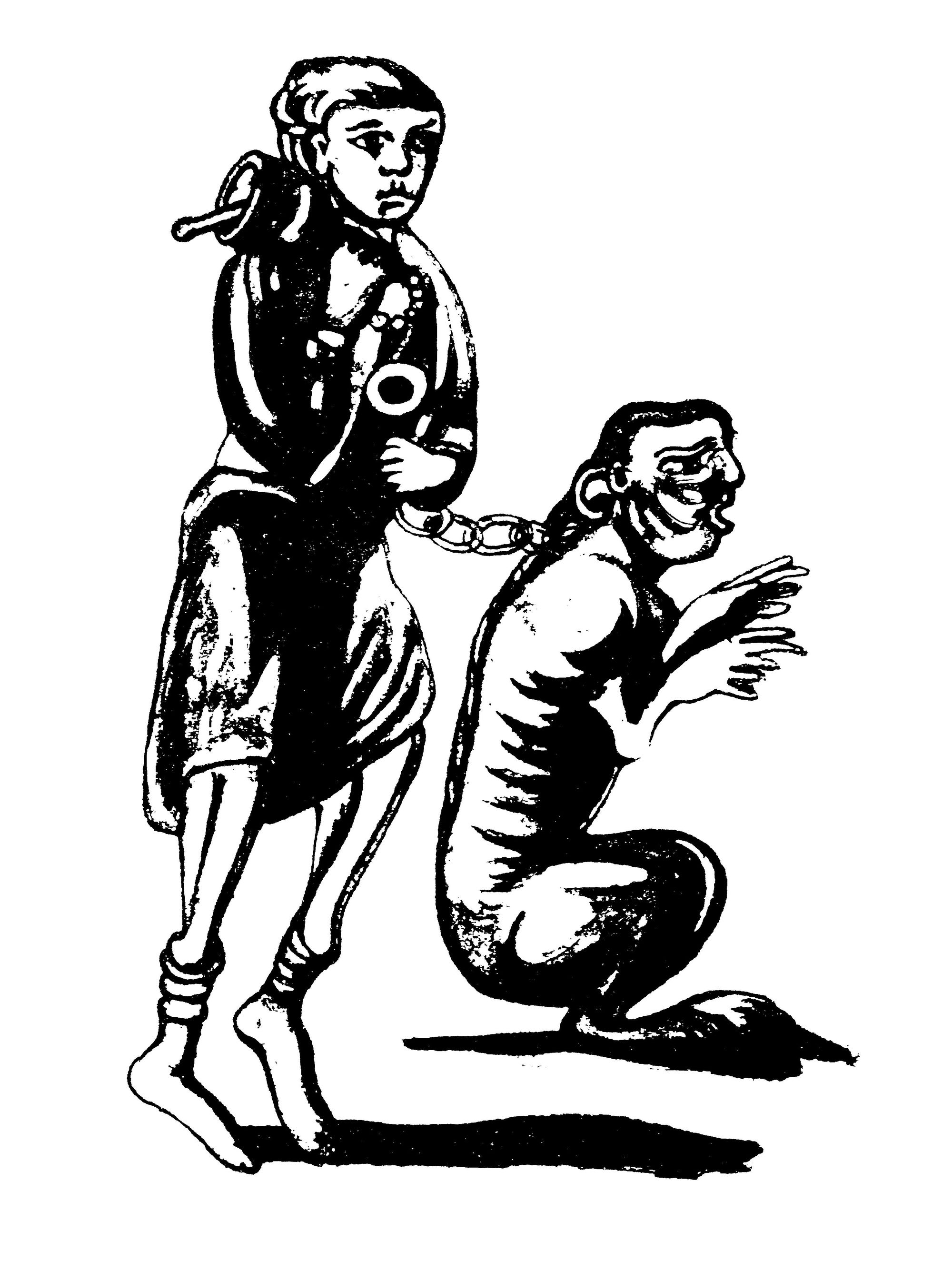
Changeling.

In Irish legend, a fairy child may appear sickly and will not grow in size like a normal child, and may have notable physical characteristics such as a beard or long teeth. They may also display intelligence far beyond their apparent years and possess uncanny insight. A common way that a changeling could identify itself is through displaying unusual behaviour when it thinks it is alone, such as jumping about, dancing or playing an instrument – though this last example is found only within Irish and Scottish legend.

A human child might supposedly be taken due to many factors: to act as a servant, the love of a human child, or malice. Most often, it was thought that fairies exchanged the children. In rare cases, the very elderly of the fairy people would be exchanged in the place of a human baby so that the old fairy could live in comfort, coddled by its human parents. Simple charms such as an inverted coat or open iron scissors left where the child sleeps were thought to ward them off; other measures included a constant watch over the child.

Folklorist D. L. Ashliman proposes in his essay 'Changelings' that changeling tales illustrate an aspect of family survival in pre-industrial Europe. A peasant family's subsistence frequently depended upon the productive labour of each member, and it was difficult to provide for a person who was a permanent drain on the family's scarce resources. "The fact that the changelings' ravenous appetite is so frequently mentioned indicates that the parents of these unfortunate children saw in their continuing existence a threat to the sustenance of the entire family. Changeling tales support other historical evidence in suggesting that infanticide was frequently the solution selected."

Fairies were also believed to take adult humans, especially the newly married and new mothers; young adults were taken to marry fairies instead, while new mothers were often taken to nurse fairy babies. Often when an adult was taken instead of a child, an object such as a log was left in place of the stolen human, enchanted to look like the person. This object in place of the human would seem to sicken and die, to be buried by the human family, while the living human was among the fairies. Bridget Cleary is one of the most well-known cases of an adult thought to be a changeling by her family: her husband killed her, attempting to force the fairies to return his 'real' wife.

== Function ==
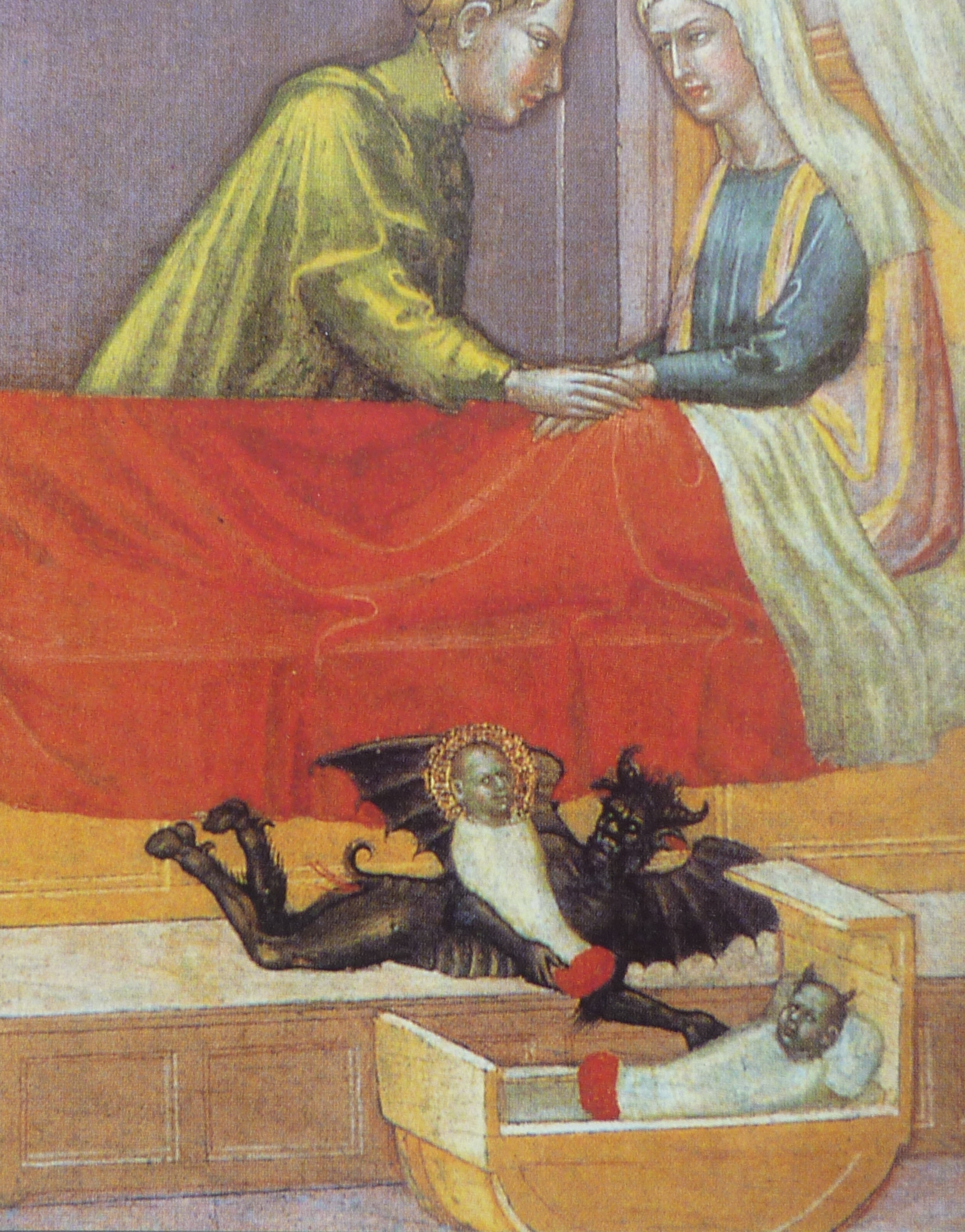
The devil steals a baby, leaving a concealed changeling. Early 15th-century detail of "The Legend of St. Stephen" by Martino di Bartolomeo

In medieval Scandinavia, it was believed that trolls considered it more respectable to be raised by humans than by their kind and would consequently seize the opportunity to give their children a human upbringing. Some believed that trolls would only take unbaptised children, since once a child had been baptized – and therefore received into the Catholic faith – the trolls were powerless to abduct it.

Beauty in human children and young women, particularly traits that evoke brightness or reflectivity, such as blonde hair and blue or silver eyes, are said to attract fairies, as they perhaps find preciousness in these traits.

In Scottish folklore, the children might be replacements for fairy children in the tithe to Hell; this is best known from the ballad of Tam Lin. According to common Scottish myths, a child born with a caul (part of the amniotic membrane) across their face is a changeling and will soon die (is "of fey birth").

Other folklore says that human milk is necessary for fairy children to survive. In these cases, either the newborn human child would be switched with a fairy baby to be suckled by the human mother, or the human mother would be taken back to the fairy world to breastfeed the fairy babies. Human midwives were also thought to be necessary to bring fairy babies into the world.

Some stories tell of changelings who forget they are not human and proceed to live a human life. However, in some stories, changelings who do not forget return to their fairy family, possibly leaving the human family without warning. The human child that was taken may often stay with the fairy family forever. Feeling connected to a changeling's fate, some families merely turn their changeling loose to the wilderness.

Some folklorists believe that fairies were memories of inhabitants of various European regions who had been driven into hiding by invaders. They held that changelings had occurred; the hiding people would exchange their sickly children for the healthy children of the occupying invader.

== In folklore ==
=== Cornwall ===
The Mên-an-Tol stones in Cornwall are said to have a fairy or pixie guardian who can make miraculous cures. In one case, a changeling baby was passed through the stone for the mother to have her real child returned to her. Evil pixies had changed her child, and the stones could reverse their spell.

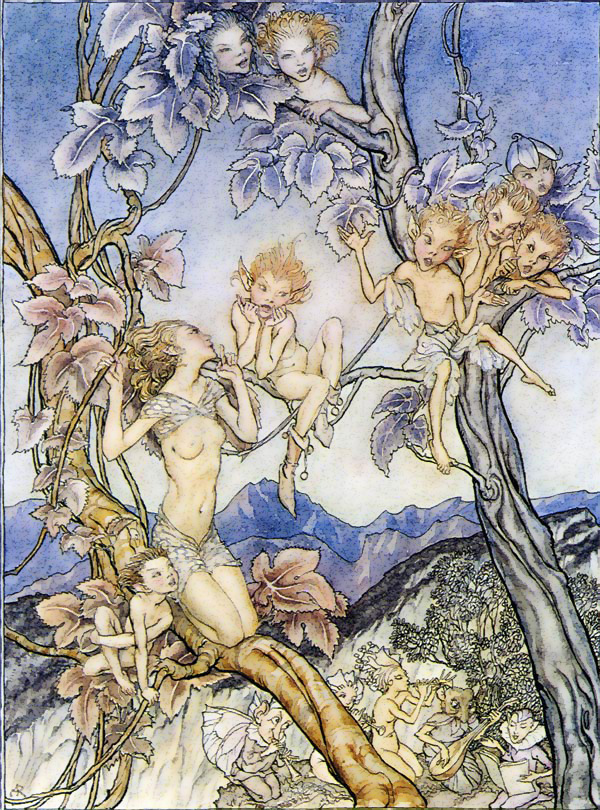
Fairies

=== Germany ===
In Germany, the changeling is known as Wechselbalg, Wechselkind, Kielkopf or Dickkopf (the last hinting at the huge necks and heads of changelings).

Several methods are known in Germany to identify a changeling and to return the replaced real child:

- confusing the changeling by cooking or brewing in eggshells. This will force the changeling to speak, claiming its age and revealing its position beyond synchronicity.
- attempting to heat the changeling in the oven – perhaps a lie by capacity to endure present.
- hitting or whipping the changeling
- The changeling must sometimes be fed with a woman's milk before replacing the children.

In German folklore, several possible parents are known for changelings. Those are:

- the devil, a belief shared by Martin Luther who advocated for baptism of changelings.
- a female dwarf
- the Fenixmännlein
- a water spirit
- a Roggenmuhme/Roggenmutter ("Rye Aunt"/"Rye Mother", a demonic woman living in cornfields and stealing human children)

=== Ireland ===
In Ireland, looking at a baby with envy – "over looking the baby" – was dangerous, as it endangered the baby, who was then in the fairies' power. So too was admiring or envying a woman or man dangerous, unless the person added a blessing; the able-bodied and beautiful were in particular danger. Women were especially in danger in liminal states: being a new bride or mother.

Putting a changeling in a fire would cause it to jump up the chimney and return the human child. Still, at least one tale recounts a mother with a changeling finding that a fairy woman came to her home with the human child, saying the other fairies had done the exchange, and she wanted her own baby. The tale of surprising a changeling into speech – by brewing eggshells – is also told in Ireland, as in Wales. Various legends describe other ways to foil a would-be fairy kidnapper. One was to shout "Gairim agus coisricim thú " (I bless you) or "God bless you," which would cause the fairy to abandon the child it was trying to steal. Another possible tactic was to insert oneself into an argument over who would keep the child; shouting "Give it to me" would trick the fairy into releasing the child back to a human.

In some instances, changelings were regarded not as substituted fairy children but as old fairies brought to the human world to die.

Irish legends regarding changelings typically follow the same formula: a tailor is the one who first notices a changeling, the inclusion of a fairy playing bagpipes or some other instrument, and the kidnapping of a human child through a window.

The modern Irish girl's name, Síofra, means an elvish or changeling child, deriving from Síobhra(í), meaning fairy(/fairies). The Aos sí, siabhra (commonly anglicised as "sheevra"), may be prone to evil and mischief. However, the Ulster folk song 'The Gartan Mother's Lullaby' also uses "sheevra" simply to mean "spirit" or "fairy".

=== The Isle of Man ===
The Isle of Man had a wide collection of myths and superstitions concerning fairies, and numerous folk tales have been collected concerning supposed changelings. Sophia Morrison, in her "Manx Fairy Tales" (David Nutt, London, 1911), includes the tale of "The Fairy Child of Close ny Lheiy", a story of a child supposedly swapped by the fairies for a loud and unruly fairy child. The English poet and topographer George Waldron, who lived in the Isle of Man during the early 18th century, cites a tale of a reputed changeling that was shown to him, possibly a child with an inherited genetic disorder:

"Nothing under heaven could have a more beautiful face; but though between five and six years old, and seemingly healthy, he was so far from being able to walk, or stand, that he could not so much as move any one joint; his limbs were vastly long for his age, but smaller than an infant's of six months; his complexion was perfectly delicate, and he had the finest hair in the world; he never spoke, nor cried, ate scarcely anything, and was very seldom seen to smile, but if any one called him a fairy-elf, he would frown and fix his eyes so earnestly on those who said it, as if he would look them through. His mother, or at least his supposed mother, being very poor, frequently went out a-charing, and left him a whole day together. The neighbours, out of curiosity, have often looked in at the window to see how he behaved when alone, which, whenever they did, they were sure to find him laughing and in the utmost delight. This made them judge that he was not without company more pleasing to him than any mortal's could be; and what made this conjecture seem the more reasonable was, that if he were left ever so dirty, the woman at her return saw him with a clean face, and his hair combed with the utmost exactness and nicety."

=== Lowland Scotland and Northern England ===
In the Anglo-Scottish border region it was believed that elves (or fairies) lived in "elf hills" (or "fairy hills"). Along with this belief in supernatural beings was the view that they could spirit away children, and even adults, and take them back to their world (see Elfhame). Often, it was thought a baby would be snatched and replaced with a simulation of the baby, usually a male adult elf, to be suckled by the mother. The real baby would be treated well by the elves and would grow up to be one of them, whereas the changeling baby would be discontented and wearisome. Many herbs, salves, and seeds could be used for discovering the fairy-folk and ward off their designs. It was also believed that to force a changeling to reveal itself, it must either be surprised into speech or made to laugh.

In one tale, a mother suspected her baby had been taken and replaced with a changeling. This view was proven to be correct one day when a neighbour ran into the house shouting, "Come here and ye'll se a sight! Yonder's the Fairy Hill a' alowe" (i.e., "the Fairy Hill is on fire"). To this, the elf got up, saying "Waes me! What'll come o' me wife and bairns?" and made his way out of the chimney.

At Byerholm near Newcastleton in Liddesdale sometime during the early 19th century, a dwarf called Robert Elliot or Little Hobbie o' The Castleton as he was known, was reputed to be a changeling. When taunted by other boys, he would not hesitate to draw his gully (a large knife) and dispatch them; however, being woefully short in the legs, they usually out-ran him and escaped. However, he was courageous, and when he heard that his neighbour, the six-foot three-inch (191 cm) William Scott of Kirndean, a sturdy and strong borderer, had slandered his name, he invited the man to his house, took him up the stairs and challenged him to a duel. Scott beat a hasty retreat.

Child ballad 40, The Queen of Elfland's Nourice, depicts the abduction of a new mother, drawing on the folklore of the changelings. Although incomplete, it contains the mother's grief and the Queen of Elfland's promise to return her to her child if she would nurse the queen's child until it can walk.

=== Poland ===
The Mamuna or Boginka is a Slavic spirit that exchanges babies (making them into odmieńce) in the cradle. The changelings left by the Mamuna were said to have a noticeably different appearance; an abnormally large abdomen, unusually small or large head, a hump, thin arms and legs, a hairy body, and long claws. Mamuna changelings would also get their first set of teeth prematurely compared to a human baby.

To protect a child from being kidnapped by the Mamuna, the mother would tie a red ribbon around the baby's wrist, put a red hat on its head, and keep it out of the moonlight. Other preventative methods included not washing diapers after sunset and never turning their head away from the baby as it slept. Still, even if the Mamuna took a child, there was a way to force her to return it. The mother would take the changeling child to a midden, whip it with a birch stick, and pour water from an eggshell over it, all while shouting, "Take yours; give mine back." Typically, the Mamuna would feel sorry for their child and return the human baby to its mother.

=== Scandinavia ===
In Nordic tradition it was generally believed that trolls or beings from the subterranean realms exchanged children. Since most of the supernatural beings of Scandinavian folklore are said to be afraid of iron, Scandinavian parents would often place an iron tool such as a pair of scissors or a knife on top of the cradle of an un-baptised infant to prevent its abduction by the trolls. It was believed that if a human child were still taken, despite such measures, the parents could force the child's return by treating the changeling cruelly, using methods such as whipping or even inserting it in a heated oven. In at least one case, a woman was taken to court for killing her child in an oven. In Sweden, it was believed that a fire must be kept lit in the room housing a child before it is christened and that the water used to bathe the child should not be thrown out, since both of these precautions will prevent the child from being taken by trolls.

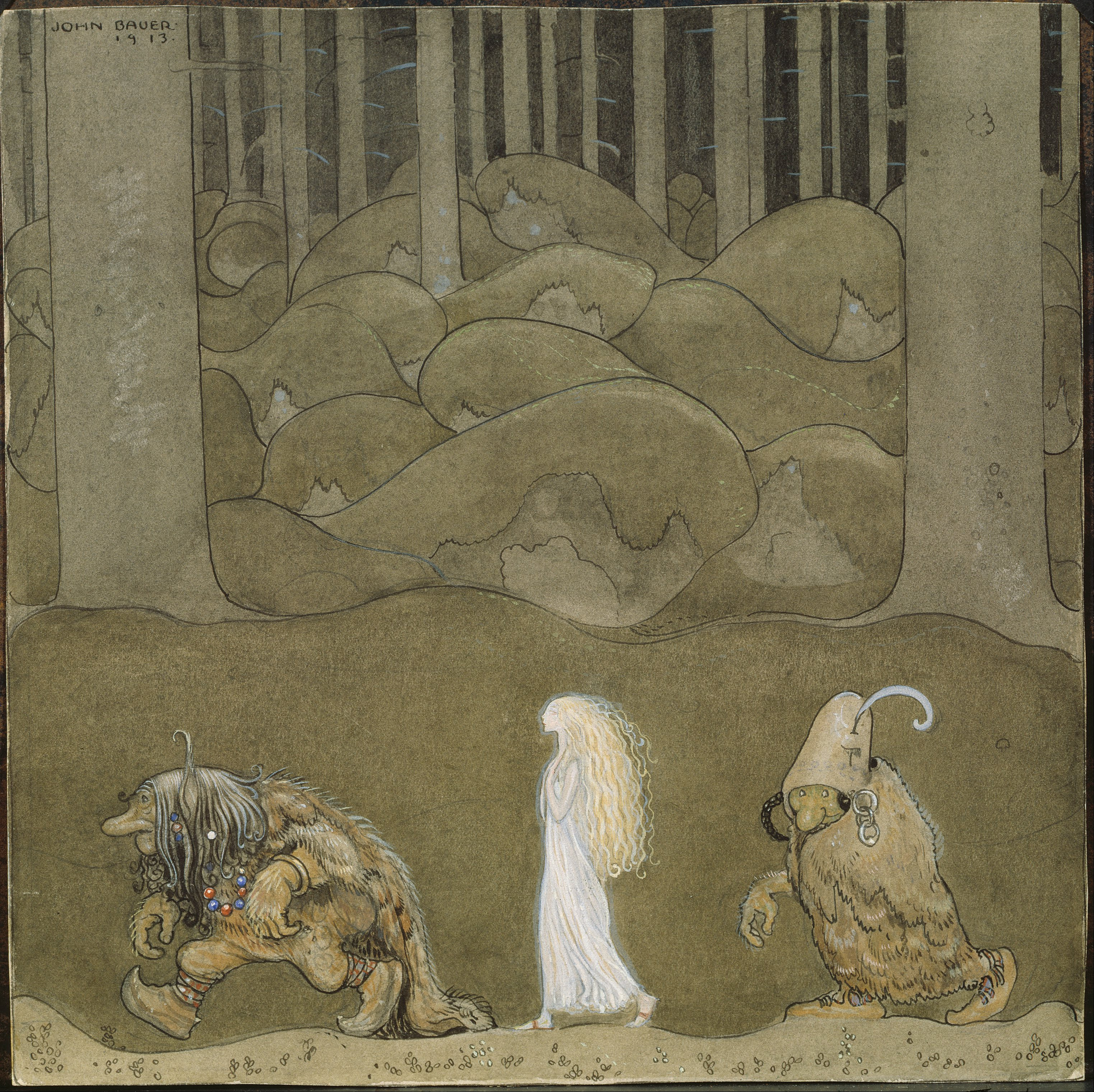
Painting by John Bauer of two trolls with a human child they have raised

In one Swedish tale, the human mother is advised to brutalize the changeling (bortbyting) so the trolls will return her son. Still, she refuses, unable to mistreat an innocent child despite knowing its nature. When her husband demands she abandon the changeling, she refuses, and he leaves her – whereupon he meets their son in the forest, wandering free. The son explains that since his mother had never been cruel to the changeling, so the troll mother had never been cruel to him, and when she sacrificed what was dearest to her, her husband, they had realized they had no power over her and released him.

The tale is notably retold by Swedish children's story author Helena Nyblom as Bortbytingarna in the 1913 book Bland tomtar och troll. (which is depicted by the image), a princess is kidnapped by trolls and replaced with their offspring against the wishes of the troll mother. The changelings grow up with their new parents, but both find it hard to adapt: the human girl is disgusted by her future bridegroom, a troll prince, whereas the troll girl is bored by her life and her dull human prospective groom. Upset with the conditions of their lives, they both go astray in the forest, passing each other without noticing it. The princess comes to the castle, whereupon the queen immediately recognizes her, and the troll girl finds a troll woman cursing loudly as she works. The troll girl bursts out that the troll woman is much more fun than any other person she has ever seen, and her mother happily sees that her true daughter has returned. The human girl and the troll girl marry happily on the same day.

=== Spain ===
In Asturias (Northern Spain), there is a legend about the Xana, a sort of nymph who used to live near rivers, fountains, and lakes, sometimes helping travellers on their journeys. The Xanas were conceived as little female fairies with supernatural beauty. They could deliver "xaninos" babies that were sometimes swapped with human babies – some legends claim this was for them to be baptized, while others claim that it is because the Xana cannot produce milk. The legend says that to distinguish a "xanino" from a human baby, some pots and egg shells should be put close to the fireplace; a xanino would say: "I was born one hundred years ago, and since then I have not seen so many egg shells near the fire!".

=== Wales ===
In Wales, the changeling child (plentyn newid (sing.), plant newid (pl.)) initially resembles the human child for which it has been substituted, but gradually grows uglier in appearance and behaviour: ill-featured, malformed, ill-tempered, given to screaming and biting. It may be of less than usual intelligence but may equally well be identifiable because of its more-than-childlike wisdom and cunning.

The common means employed to identify a changeling is to cook a family meal in an eggshell. The child will exclaim, "I have seen the acorn before the oak, but I never saw the likes of this," and vanish, only to be replaced by the original human child. Alternatively, or following this identification, it is supposedly necessary to mistreat the child by placing it in a hot oven, holding it in a shovel over a hot fire, or bathing it in a solution of foxglove.

=== United States ===
There are some rare instances of changeling beliefs being brought across the Atlantic by European settlers. The best attested case is from Iowa, 1876, where a Miss Kittie Crowe was said to have been taken by the fairies.

== In the historical record ==
King Charles I of England (1600–1649) was reportedly rumored to have been a changeling due to his "peevish nature" as a child and a nursemaid's claim that a figure appeared mysteriously at his bedside and cast a cloak over the sleeping baby's cradle.

Children identified as changelings by the superstitious were often abused or murdered, sometimes in the belief that changelings could be forced to admit their true nature by beatings, exposure to fire or water, or other trials.

Two 19th-century cases reflect the belief in changelings. In 1826, Anne Roche bathed Michael Leahy, a four-year-old boy unable to speak or stand, three times in the Flesk; he drowned the third time. She swore she was merely attempting to drive the fairy out of him. The jury acquitted her of murder. In 1895, Bridget Cleary was killed by several people, including her husband and cousins, after a short bout of illness (probably pneumonia). Local storyteller, Jack Dunne accused Bridget of being a fairy changeling. It is debatable whether her husband, Michael, actually believed her to be a fairy, or instead used the excuse after killing her in a rage. The killers were convicted of manslaughter rather than murder, as even after the death, they claimed to be convinced they had killed a changeling, not Bridget Cleary herself.

== Outside Europe ==
=== Africa ===
The Igbo people of eastern Nigeria traditionally believed that a woman who lost numerous children, whether stillborn or early in infancy, was being tormented by an ogbanje, a malicious spirit that reincarnated itself over and over again. One of the most commonly prescribed methods for ridding oneself of an ogbanje was to find and destroy its iyi-uwa, a buried object tying it to the mortal world.

Many scholars now believe that ogbanje stories arose as an attempt to explain the loss of children with sickle-cell anemia. Even today, infant death is common among children born with severe sickle-cell anemia, especially in areas of Africa lacking adequate medical resources.

The similarity between the European changeling and the Igbo ogbanje is so marked that Igbos themselves often translate the word into English as "changeling". The abiku was a rough analogue of the ogbanje among the related Yoruba peoples to the west of Igboland.

== In the modern world ==
The word oaf, a clumsy or stupid person, is derived from the historic English word for a changeling, auf. This, in turn, is believed to have originated from the Middle English alven and elven, and ultimately from the Old Norse word for an elf, alfr.

=== Medical explanations ===
Modern scholars hypothesize some changeling tales developed in an attempt to explain deformed, developmentally disabled, or neurodivergent children. Scholars Goodey and Stainton have rejected a simple mapping of the modern understanding of disability onto the changeling folklore, suggesting that the word itself is too contextual and variable, and that modern sensibilities and contemporary feelings of guilt and aversion are coming into play.

Among the diseases or disabilities with symptoms that match the description of changelings in various legends are spina bifida, cystic fibrosis, PKU, progeria, Down syndrome, homocystinuria, Williams syndrome, Hurler syndrome, Hunter syndrome, autism spectrum disorder, Prader-Willi Syndrome, and cerebral palsy. The greater incidence of congenital disabilities in boys correlates to the belief that male infants were more likely to be taken by fairies. Psychologist Stuart Vyse writes that modern parents have higher expectations of childbirth, and when "children don't meet these expectations, parents sometimes find a different demon to blame." A condition known as regressive autism, where children appear to follow normal development in their early years and then start to show symptoms of autism, can also be compared to marks of a changeling child.

Some autistic adults have come to identify with changelings (or other replacements, such as aliens) due to their experiences of feeling out of place in the world.

=== In nature ===
Several species of birds, fish, and arthropods regularly practice brood parasitism, or non-reciprocal offspring-swapping. Rather than raising their young alone, they will lay their egg in another's nest, leaving the burden of raising their young on the unsuspecting parents of another species altogether. More often than not, the invading species hatches sooner than its "stepsiblings" and grows faster, eventually hogging most nourishment brought in, and may actually "evict" the young of the host species by pushing them out of their own nest.

== Scholarship ==
The first monograph-length study on European changelings was Gisela Piaschewski who wrote in German The Changeling: A Contribution to the Superstition of the Northern European Peoples as her university thesis (Der Wechselbalg: Ein Beitrag zum Aberglauben der nordeuropäischen Völker, Breslau: Maruschke & Berendt Verlag, 1935). The 2020s saw Rose Sawyer's monograph The Medieval Changeling: Health, Childcare, and the Family Unit and The Exeter Companion to Changeling Lore: The West Eurasian and Mediterranean Tradition.

== See also ==
- Capgras delusion
- Doppelgänger
- Fox spirit
- Half-elf
- Imbunche
- Incubus/Succubus
- Korrigan
- Otherkin
- Spriggan
- Wendigo
- Al (folklore)
- La Légende du Changeling
