= Women's Prize for Fiction =

Annual literary award

- Awarded for: Best full-length novel written in English by a woman of any nationality, published in the UK
- Sponsored by: Orange (1996–2012); Private benefactors (2013); Baileys Irish Cream (2014–2017); Family of sponsors (2018–)
- Location: United Kingdom
- Presented by: Women's Prize Trust
- First award: 1996
- Website: womensprize.com/prizes/womens-prize-for-fiction/

The Women's Prize for Fiction (previously with sponsor names Orange Prize for Fiction (1996–2006 and 2009–2012), Orange Broadband Prize for Fiction (2007–08) and Baileys Women's Prize for Fiction (2014–2017) is one of the United Kingdom's most prestigious literary prizes. It is awarded annually to a female author of any nationality for the best original full-length novel written in English and published in the United Kingdom in the preceding year. A sister prize, the Women's Prize for Non-Fiction, was launched in 2023.

== Early history ==
The prize was established in 1996, to recognise the literary achievement of female writers. The inspiration for the prize was the Booker Prize of 1991, when none of the six shortlisted books was by a woman, despite some 60% of novels published that year being by female authors. A group of women and men working in the industry – authors, publishers, agents, booksellers, librarians, journalists – therefore met to discuss the issue. Research showed that women's literary achievements were often not acknowledged by the major literary prizes.

The winner of the prize receives £30,000, along with a bronze sculpture called the Bessie created by artist Grizel Niven. Typically, a longlist of nominees is announced around March each year, followed by a shortlist in June; within days the winner is announced. The winner is selected by a board of "five leading women" each year.

In support of the 2004 award, the Orange Prize for Fiction published a list of 50 contemporary "essential reads." The books were chosen by a sample of 500 people attending the Guardian Hay Festival and represent the audience's "must have" books by living UK writers. The list is called the Orange Prize for Fiction's "50 Essential Reads by Contemporary Authors."

== Name history and sponsors ==
The prize was originally sponsored by Orange, a telecommunications company. In May 2012, it was announced Orange would be ending its corporate sponsorship of the prize. There was no corporate sponsor for 2013; sponsorship was by "private benefactors", led by Cherie Blair and writers Joanna Trollope and Elizabeth Buchan.

Beginning in 2014, the prize was sponsored by the liquor brand Baileys Irish Cream, owned by the drinks conglomerate Diageo. In January 2017, Diageo announced that it had "regretfully decided to make way for a new sponsor", and would step aside after the 2017 prize was announced that June.

In June 2017, the prize announced that it would change its name to simply "Women's Prize for Fiction" starting in 2018, and would be supported by a family of sponsors. As of 2023 the family of sponsors includes Baileys and Audible.

=== Award name ===
- Orange Prize for Fiction (1996–2006 and 2009–2012)
- Orange Broadband Prize for Fiction (2007–2008)
- Baileys Women's Prize for Fiction (2014–2017)
- Women's Prize for Fiction (2013 and 2018–present)

== Legacy ==
The prize has "spawned" several sub-category competitions and awards: the Harper's Bazaar Broadband Short Story Competition, the Orange Award for New Writers, the Penguin/Orange Readers' Group Prize, and the Reading Book Group of the Year.

In 2023 it was announced that a sister prize, the Women's Prize for Non-Fiction, would be awarded for the first time in 2024, with a £30,000 prize which for the first three years would be funded by the Charlotte Aitken Trust, who would also supply the winner's statuette, "The Charlotte."

In 2025, a one-off prize, The Women's Prize Outstanding Contribution Award, funded by Bukhman Philanthropies, was created “for a living female writer in recognition of her body of work, her significant contribution to literature, and her strong advocacy for women. Authors who had been previously longlisted, shortlisted or won the Women’s Prize for Fiction over the past three decades, and had published a minimum of five books, were eligible for the award”. The panel selected Bernardine Evaristo as the recipient of this award.

== Winners and shortlisted writers ==
The winner of the 2025 Women's Prize for Fiction was Yael van der Wouden for her debut novel, The Safekeep

== #ThisBook ==
In May 2014, Baileys Women's Prize for Fiction launched the #ThisBook campaign to find out which books, written by women, have had the biggest impact on readers. Nineteen "inspirational women" were chosen to launch the campaign and then thousands of people from the "general public" submitted their ideas via Twitter. The 20 winners were announced on 29 July 2014. The organisers noted that nearly half (eight) of the winning books were published before 1960.

1. To Kill a Mockingbird (1960), Harper Lee
2. The Handmaid's Tale (1985), Margaret Atwood
3. Jane Eyre (1847), Charlotte Brontë
4. Harry Potter (1997), J. K. Rowling
5. Wuthering Heights (1847), Emily Brontë
6. Pride and Prejudice (1813), Jane Austen
7. Rebecca (1938), Daphne du Maurier
8. Little Women (1868–69), Louisa May Alcott
9. The Secret History (1992), Donna Tartt
10. I Capture the Castle (1948), Dodie Smith
11. The Bell Jar (1963), Sylvia Plath
12. Beloved (1987), Toni Morrison
13. Gone With The Wind (1936), Margaret Mitchell
14. We Need to Talk About Kevin (2003), Lionel Shriver
15. The Time Traveler's Wife (2003), Audrey Niffenegger
16. Middlemarch (1871–72), George Eliot
17. I Know Why the Caged Bird Sings (1969), Maya Angelou
18. The Golden Notebook (1962), Doris Lessing
19. The Color Purple (1982), Alice Walker
20. The Women's Room (1977), Marilyn French

== Reclaim Her Name ==
To mark the 25th anniversary of the prize, sponsor Bailey's worked with the prize organisers to republish "25 books previously published under male pen names, with the real female authors' names finally printed on the covers, to honour their achievements and give them the credit they deserve" as part of the series "Reclaim Her Name." Among the books were Middlemarch, republished under the name Mary Ann Evans in place of George Eliot; A Phantom Lover, republished under the name Violet Paget in place of Vernon Lee; Indiana, republished under the name Amantine Aurore Dupin in place of George Sand; and Takekurabe, republished under the name Natsu Higuchi in place of Ichiyō Higuchi.

The campaign has been controversial, attracting criticism from the press as well as scholars and publishers. Among the criticisms were a number of factual errors: Reclaim Her Name published the biographical The Life of Martin R. Delany, in this edition attributed to Frances Rollin Whipper in place of Frank A. Rollin, with a cover image depicting the abolitionist Frederick Douglass instead of Martin Delany. The series was also criticised for having attributed a work of disputed authorship to Edith Maude Eaton, the given name of Sui Sin Far, and for having used a number of names which the authors the works are attributed to appear never to have used themselves, among them Mary Ann Evans, the purported "real" name of George Eliot, who in fact never combined "Mary Ann" and "Evans", having instead at different times signed with variants including Mary Anne Evans, Marian Evans Lewes and Mary Ann Cross. Bailey's issued an apology for the erroneous cover of The Life of Martin R. Delany, attributing the use of the image to "human error", and replaced the cover.

Other criticisms expressed skepticism about the series' understanding of "pseudonymity" and "anonymity" and questioned the implicit assumptions behind its creation, namely that it is possible to "reclaim" a self which is not one's own; that a legal or given name is necessarily more relevant or, in the words of the campaign, "real" than a chosen one; and that the authors republished as part of the series would have chosen to use a different professional name than the one they invented and maintained throughout their careers and sometimes personal lives. The academic journal Legacy, for example, publicised an extensive critical discussion of the campaign, featuring scholars such as Lois Brown of Arizona State University, Mary Chapman of the University of British Columbia, Brigitte Fielder of the University of Wisconsin; Grace Lavery of the University of California, Berkeley, Christine Yao of University College London and Sandra Zagarell of Oberlin College, among others. At the same time, Olivia Rutigliano wrote for Literary Hub that the campaign's use of the authors' legal and given names "blatantly ignores their own decisions about how to present their works, and in some instances, perhaps even how to present themselves." Catherine Taylor of The Times Literary Supplement similarly cautioned that a "one-size-fits-all approach overlooks the complexities of publishing history, in which pseudonyms aren't always about conforming to patriarchal or other obvious standard", noting that Vernon Lee entirely abandoned the legal name Violet Paget both on the page and off it, while George Sand incorporated it into her public presentation, as part of which she also wore menswear, smoked and engaged in behaviours which queered gender boundaries of the time. Similarly, Grace Lavery has pointed out that, unlike Mary Shelley and Elizabeth Barrett Browning, who wrote under "feminine" names, or else Anne Brontë, Emily Brontë and Charlotte Brontë, who gradually adopted them, George Eliot chose to continue writing as Eliot even after having been "outed" as Marian Evans Lewes, appearing even to have "relished being thought of as male, and [having been] disappointed when people thought otherwise." Amy Richardson at The Attic on Eighth has additionally pointed out that in renaming Sui Sin Far or Mahlon T. Wing, who "wrote under a Chinese name as a way of reclaiming her Chinese identity" into Edith Maude Eaton and "publishing her work under her 'white' name, conveyed upon her by her white British father," the campaign "strip[s] her of her identity as a Chinese woman and place[s] this particular work into a bizarre place where it becomes more offensive." Richardson also cautions that of the "women who have been chosen to have their names 'reclaimed'," many apart from Lee and Sand also "actively blurred the boundaries with how they presented themselves on a day to day basis. [...] This playing with gender presentation alongside a choice of male pseudonyms suggests that there is more going on here than the Women's Prize campaign allows space for there to be."

== Criticism ==
The fact that the prize excludes male writers has provoked comment. After the prize was founded, Auberon Waugh nicknamed it the "Lemon Prize", while Germaine Greer said there would soon be a prize for "writers with red hair." A. S. Byatt, who won the 1990 Man Booker Prize, said it was a "sexist prize", claiming that "such a prize was never needed." She refused to have her work considered for this prize. In 2007, former editor of The Times Simon Jenkins called the prize "sexist." In 2008, writer Tim Lott said that "the Orange Prize is sexist and discriminatory, and it should be shunned."

On the other hand, in 2011 London journalist Jean Hannah Edelstein wrote about her own "wrong reasons" for supporting the prize:

Unfortunately, the evidence shows that the experiences of male and female writers after they set their pens down are often distinctively different. That's why I've changed my mind about the Orange prize. I still agree with Byatt that the idea of female-specific subject matter is spurious, but I don't think that's what the prize rewards.

In 2012 Cynthia Ozick, writing in The New York Times, said the Prize "was not born into an innocent republic of letters" when it comes to a history of women writers being discriminated against. She concluded: "For readers and writers, in sum, the more prizes the better, however they are structured, and philosophy be damned."

In 1999 Lola Young, chair of the judges' panel, claimed that British female literature fell into two categories, either "insular and parochial" or "domestic in a piddling kind of way." Linda Grant suffered accusations of plagiarism following her award in 2000. In 2001 a panel of male critics strongly criticised the Orange shortlist and produced its own. In 2007, broadcaster Muriel Gray, chair of the panel, said that judges had to wade through "a lot of dross" to get to the shortlist, but praised that year's winner, Half of a Yellow Sun by Nigerian author Chimamanda Ngozi Adichie, saying: "This is a moving and important book by an incredibly exciting author."

In 2019, Akwaeke Emezi's debut novel, Freshwater, was nominated – the first time a non-binary transgender author has been nominated for the prize. Women's prize judge Professor Kate Williams said that the panel did not know Emezi was non-binary when the book was chosen, but she said Emezi was happy to be nominated. Non-binary commentator Vic Parsons wrote that the nomination raised uncomfortable questions, asking: "would a non-binary author who was assigned male at birth have been longlisted? I highly doubt it." After the nomination, it was announced that the Women's Prize Trust was working on new guidelines for transgender, non-binary, and genderfluid authors. The Women's Prize later asked for Emezi's "sex as defined by law" when submitting The Death of Vivek Oji for inclusion. Emezi chose to withdraw, and said that they would not submit their future novels for consideration, calling the requirement transphobic. Joanna Prior, Chair of Trustees for the Women's Prize for Fiction, has stated that in the prize's terms and conditions, "the word 'woman' equates to a cis woman, a transgender woman, or anyone who is legally defined as a woman or of the female sex."

== See also ==
- List of literary awards honoring women
