= Brewery of Eggshells =

Irish fairy tale collected by Thomas Crofton Croker

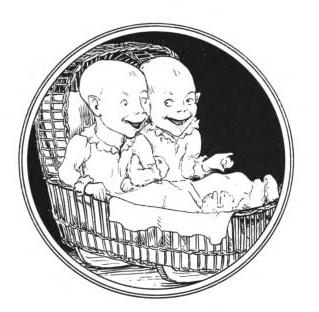
- Changeling twins illustrated by John D. Batten, 1892

Folk tale
- Name: Brewery of Eggshells
- Country: Ireland
- Origin Date: 1825
- Published in: Fairy Legends and Traditions of the South of Ireland

Brewery of Eggshells is an Irish fairy tale collected by Thomas Crofton Croker in Fairy Legends and Traditions of the South of Ireland.

== Variants ==
The Brothers Grimm collected Die Wichtelmänner and cite a similar Danish tale collected by Just Mathias Thiele.

In a Welsh tale published in Cambrian Quarterly Magazine, "The Egg-Shell Pottage," a woman had to leave her twin babies alone for a time. When she returned, she saw two elves in blue petticoats cross her path. The babies looked the same, but would not grow. She and her husband argued about whether the children were theirs. A wise man told her to make pottage in an eggshell, as if she intended to feed the entire troop of harvesters with it. When she did, the children exclaimed on it as something they had never seen, though they were older than acorns grown into oaks. She threw them into the water, which made their own parents take them back and give back the twins.
