= Somadina (novel) =

2025 novel by Akwaeke Emezi

- Cover of the 2026 Alfred A. Knopf edition
- Author: Akwaeke Emezi
- Language: English
- Genre: Young Adult (YA) Fantasy and Magical Realism
- Publisher: Knopf Books for Young Readers
- Publication date: April 15, 2025
- Publication place: New York
- Media type: Print, e-book, audiobook
- Pages: 304
- ISBN: 9780593309100

Somadina is a 2025 young adult fantasy and magical realism novel by Nigerian writer Akwaeke Emezi. It was published by Knopf Books for Young Readers in the United States and Faber and Faber in the United Kingdom.

== Plot ==
The novel follows teenage Somadina and her twin brother, Jayaike, who share a deep connection, often completing each other's sentences and existing as two halves of a whole. They also share the same supernatural abilities. When Jayaike is kidnapped, Somadina embarks on a journey to find him, even if it means venturing deep into the sacred forest and the otherworldly realm beyond, all while learning to navigate her newly discovered powers.

The novel is further enriched by Emezi's distinct queer perspective. Through the experiences of Somadina, Jayaike, and Uwafulamiro, the story examines rejection, exclusion, and othering, offering readers a poignant reflection on how society often treats those considered "different" or outside accepted norms.

== Reception ==
Writing for Locus Magazine, Alex Brown described the novel as characteristic of Emezi's work, featuring lush, lyrical prose and vivid, distinctive storytelling. Brown noted that, "in a publishing landscape dominated by a specific strain of romantic fantasy and fantasy romance featuring older teens, it stands out as fresh and unusual."

Kirkus Reviews described the novel as "magic is packed into every corner of a lush, if unevenly developed, tale," while Alexandra Quay, writing for School Library Journal, compared it to Nnedi Okorafor's Nsibidi Scripts series (Akata trilogy).

== Awards ==
- Nominated for the 2027 Pennsylvania Keystone to Reading Book Award
- Selected for the 2026 Chicago Public Library's Best of the Best Books
