= La Légende du Changeling =

Franco-Belgian comic book series

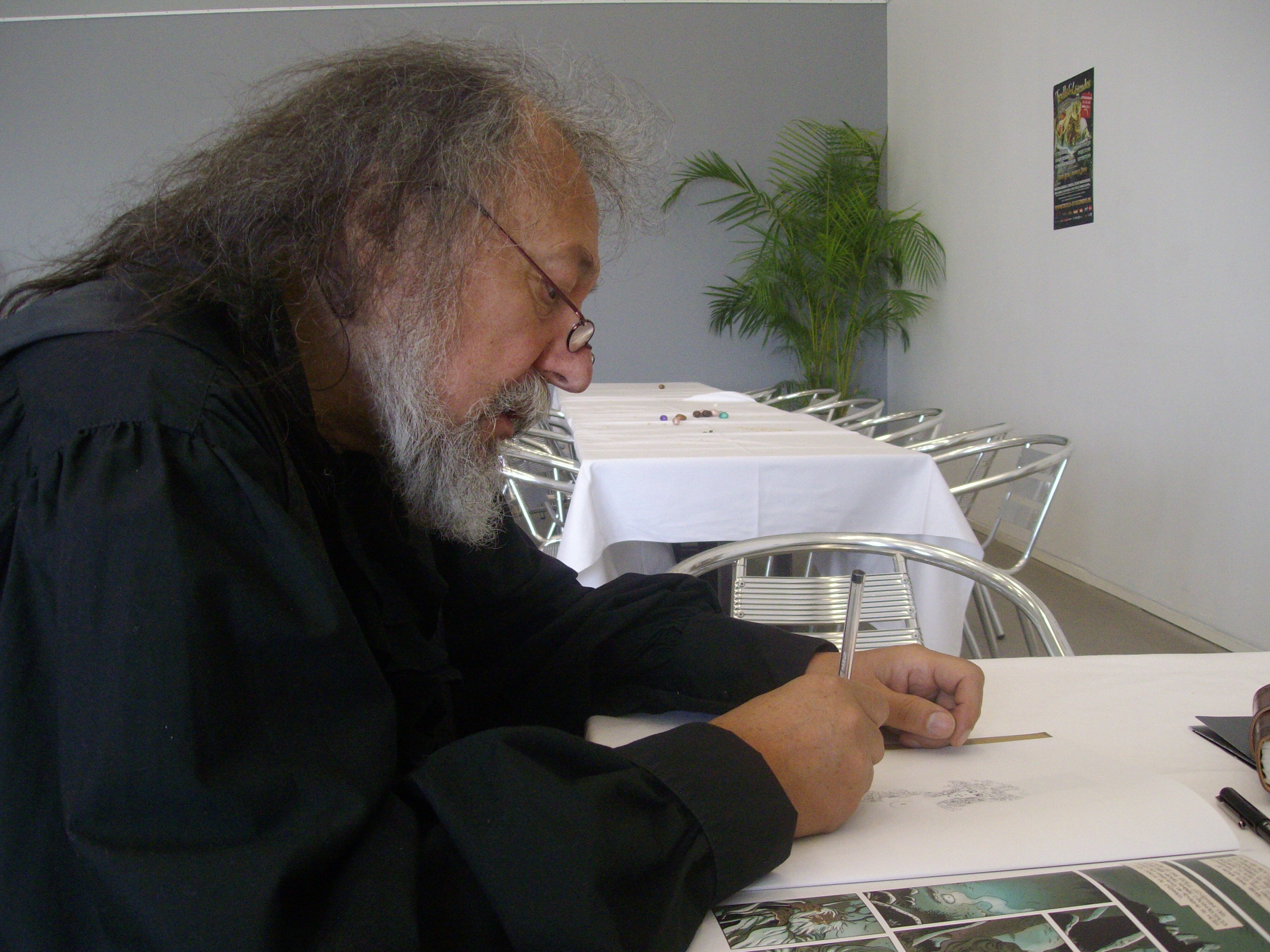
- Pierre Dubois signing one of the albums of La Légende du Changeling at the Trolls et Légendes festival in Mons, on April 24, 2011.
- Author: Pierre Dubois
- Illustrator: Xavier Fourquemin
- Launch date: 2008
- Publisher: Le Lombard
- Genre: Fantasy
- Original language: French

La Légende du Changeling (The Legend of the Changeling in English) is a Franco-Belgian comic book series in five volumes created by Pierre Dubois (script), Xavier Fourquemin (art), and Scarlett Smulkowski (colors), published as albums between June 2008 and March 2012 by Le Lombard, at the pace of one volume per year.

Set in Victorian England, it tells the story of Scrubby, a fairy child exchanged at birth for a human baby. Gifted with the ability to see the little folk, Scrubby leaves the wild region of Dartmoor, where he has lived for twelve years, when his adoptive family moves to London in search of work. He goes through various trials, including the loss of his father, mother, and the girl he loves; a harsh job as a child miner; the struggle against the killer Spring Heeled Jack; and the attack of a satanic cult—before the revelation of his origins and his role.

The series received good reviews and a favorable reception. Pierre Dubois, elfologist, storyteller, and expert on the theme, created an initiatory narrative that also serves as a social critique of the Industrial Revolution, where extreme wealth coexists with extreme poverty. The fine and expressive linework of Xavier Fourquemin, who gives distinctive "faces" to his characters, and the colors by Scarlett Smulkowski complement the series’ historical-fantasy style.

== Background ==
In an interview with Richard Ely, screenwriter Pierre Dubois mentioned his fascination with the changeling of popular folklore, hence his desire to write a story on the subject: “Beyond the legend, in popular tradition, when a child was different from others, it used to be said they were a changeling, that they came from elsewhere. Pushing it even further, a child who wasn’t ‘normal’ was a fada, meaning a child of the fairies—they were different. However, these children had other gifts. Even today, they might have a gift for music or recall incredible numbers. That always frightened people. I’ve always been fascinated by the changeling, especially when you’re a child yourself and feel a little different from others…”

Before meeting illustrator Xavier Fourquemin, he had already imagined two scripts about changelings: a dark one in a single album, and another longer and more visual one. Fourquemin and colorist Scarlett Smulkowski had previously worked together on Miss Endicott, which is also set in 19th-century London. The setting is therefore very close to their previous series, even if the story is different. Fourquemin was familiar with and appreciated Dubois’s earlier work on the series Laïyna before they met, saying he used to buy Spirou in the 1980s just to follow that story. Dubois, for his part, liked Fourquemin’s drawing style, particularly his cover art. He had read Outlaw and reviewed Alban, for which he wrote a title board, during his time at France 3.

After finishing Miss Endicott and looking for a new project, Fourquemin met Dubois in Valenciennes and expressed his desire to create a story “about fantastic and fairy-like characters,” aiming for a pure fantasy universe to build a world, without necessarily continuing in the same genre as his previous series. Dubois preferred the fantastique. The two men developed a mutual understanding and subsequently initiated a collaboration. The selected script originates from Dubois’ characteristic tendency to avoid situating his narratives directly within the “land of the fairies.” Instead, his stories are typically set in the real world, where characters either strive to access the fairy realm or encounter fairies entering the human domain. Central to his work is the dissolution of the boundary between these two worlds—a “passage” that constitutes a recurring source of fascination for the author. The choice of the Victorian era reflects a desire to highlight “what can be lost by remaining closed to the path of fairy tales.” Le Lombard approved the project and initially planned a four-volume series, but Dubois insisted on five. The writer and illustrator drew inspiration from photographs of Dartmoor and walks through London to enrich their albums.

== Plot ==
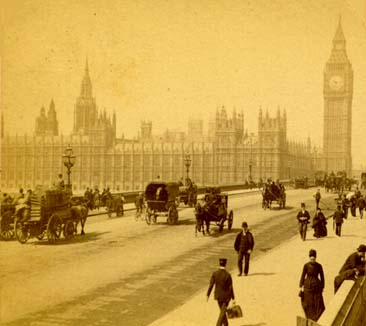
19th-century London (here, the Palace of Westminster) forms the main setting for the series.

The storyline of The Legend of the Changeling takes place in the Victorian era, in an England undergoing an industrial revolution. It tells the story of Scrubby, a fairy child exchanged at birth for a human baby, gifted with the ability to see the little folk.

== Characters ==
=== Scrubby ===
Scrubby is a fairy child exchanged at birth for a human baby—a changeling. He frequently tries to connect with the world he came from, the world of the fairies. This is the reason for his love towards nature and bonds with animals. (Note: See volume 1 when he plays with animals in the forest, volumes 2 and 4 when he tames rats, etc.) He lives among humans yet experiences a sense of otherness—positioned between two worlds, suspended between two temporalities, and situated outside the established social order. He does not grow up, and despite the terrible ordeals he endures, he retains a sense of wonder and innocence toward the world around him. (Note: For example, when he sees sculptures shaped like fauns or satyrs in the first volume, and says they “must be cold in the stone.”) He transmits innocence but is not “gullible” for all that: he is an eternal child who perceives the magical and the spirits of nature at every moment, even while working deep in a mine or facing crime and prostitution. He tends to come to the rescue of those he considers good and fragile.

=== Scrubby’s family and friends ===
Betty and Thomas, Scrubby’s adoptive parents, know that he is not their child. Scrubby notices changes in Betty’s behavior, as she shifts from apparent love to fierce hatred toward him. She commits suicide by throwing herself into the Thames after the death of her husband, a simple laborer who shows affection to his adoptive son. Sheela, Scrubby’s adoptive sister, shares with him a love for nature and a certain knowledge of creatures from the Otherworld, as she can dance among the fairies and repel Spring Heeled Jack. Scrubby regularly encounters others who help him by protecting, educating, and preparing him for his destiny: the old wise man of Wistman’s Wood, the mine knocker, the tramp No More, and Rob. All prevent his enemies from reaching him and arm him for the final battle. Despite losing his parents, Scrubby is surrounded by beings who love and protect him.

=== Enemies ===
Sir Charles Warren, the leader of a satanic cult, is the one who summoned Spring Heeled Jack. He is marked by his fierce hatred for common people. He is also responsible for the murder of Scrubby’s father. Spring Heeled Jack, the series’ main antagonist, is a killer who prowls the streets of London. Lastly, the "Lord of Chaos" is Scrubby’s final enemy, though it is not confirmed whether he is also the demon known as Spring Heeled Jack, described as “the embodiment of evil since the dawn of time.”

== Albums ==
Volume	Title	Published by Le Lombard	ISBN
1	Le Mal-venu	June 6, 2008 (56 pages)	ISBN 978-2-80362-409-6
2	Le Croque-mitaine	April 24, 2009 (56 pages)	ISBN 978-2-80362-532-1
3	Spring Heeled Jack	March 19, 2010 (56 pages)	ISBN 978-2-80362-641-0
4	Les Lisières de l'ombre	February 9, 2011 (56 pages)	ISBN 978-2-8036-2803-2
5	La Nuit Asraï	March 30, 2012 (64 pages)	ISBN 978-2-8036-2996-1

=== Le Mal-venu (The Unwelcome) ===
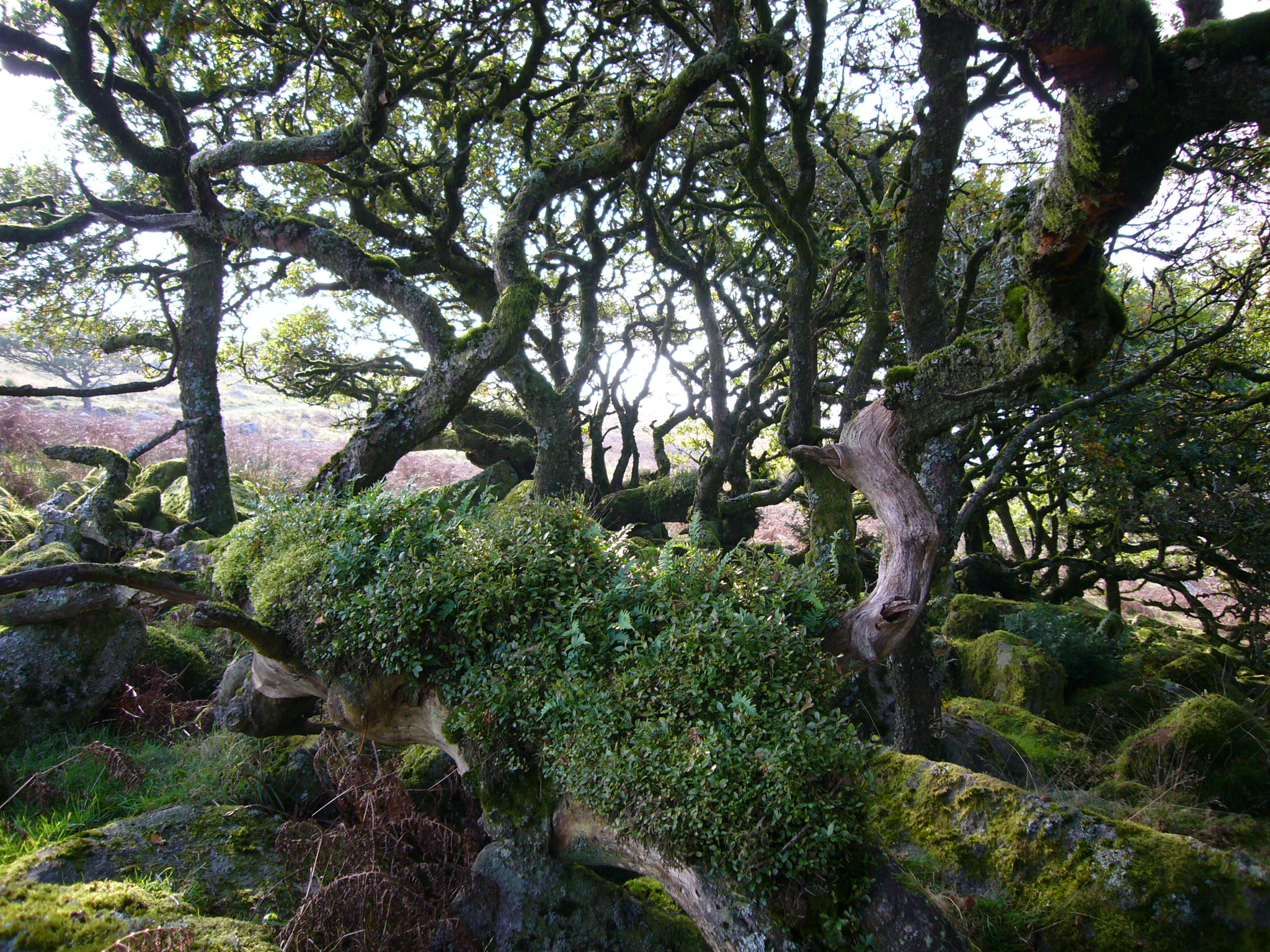
Wistman's Wood, in the Dartmoor forest, is a place mentioned in The Uncivilized.

The Jobson family lives in the old wild moorlands of Dartmoor when their youngest child disappears due to the negligence of their daughter Sheela. Betty Jobson blames the fairies and performs a ritual to retrieve her son. A few days later, a strange baby is left at their doorstep. He is adopted by the family, who nicknamed him Scrubby. Twelve years later, Scrubby has become a true little wildling, in love with nature. During an outing near Wistman’s Wood, he meets the Wild Huntsman, an old hermit who teaches him the secrets of the little folk, until the Jobson family, struck by poverty, moves to London hoping to find work. Scrubby discovers a city of depravity where poor people like his parents are exploited, but he manages to reconnect with nature in Kensington Gardens. There, he befriends a homeless man named No More. A man with red eyes seems to be linked to the misfortunes of his family. The working poor begin to revolt in Hyde Park. Scrubby’s adoptive father, Thomas, is killed in the confrontation.

=== Le Croque-mitaine (The Boogeyman) ===
Betty commits suicide shortly after her husband’s death by throwing herself into the Thames. Scrubby is compelled to seek employment in London to support himself and his sister, yet he retains his enthusiasm for life. Sheela secures a position as a waitress at the Princess Alice, while he takes up work in the mine, heeding the advice of the old man from Wistman’s Wood. There, he befriends a miner named Rob, who tells him about the little folk of the mines, the Knockers. He reunites with them and allies with them to save the miners from a planned attack.

=== Spring Heeled Jack ===
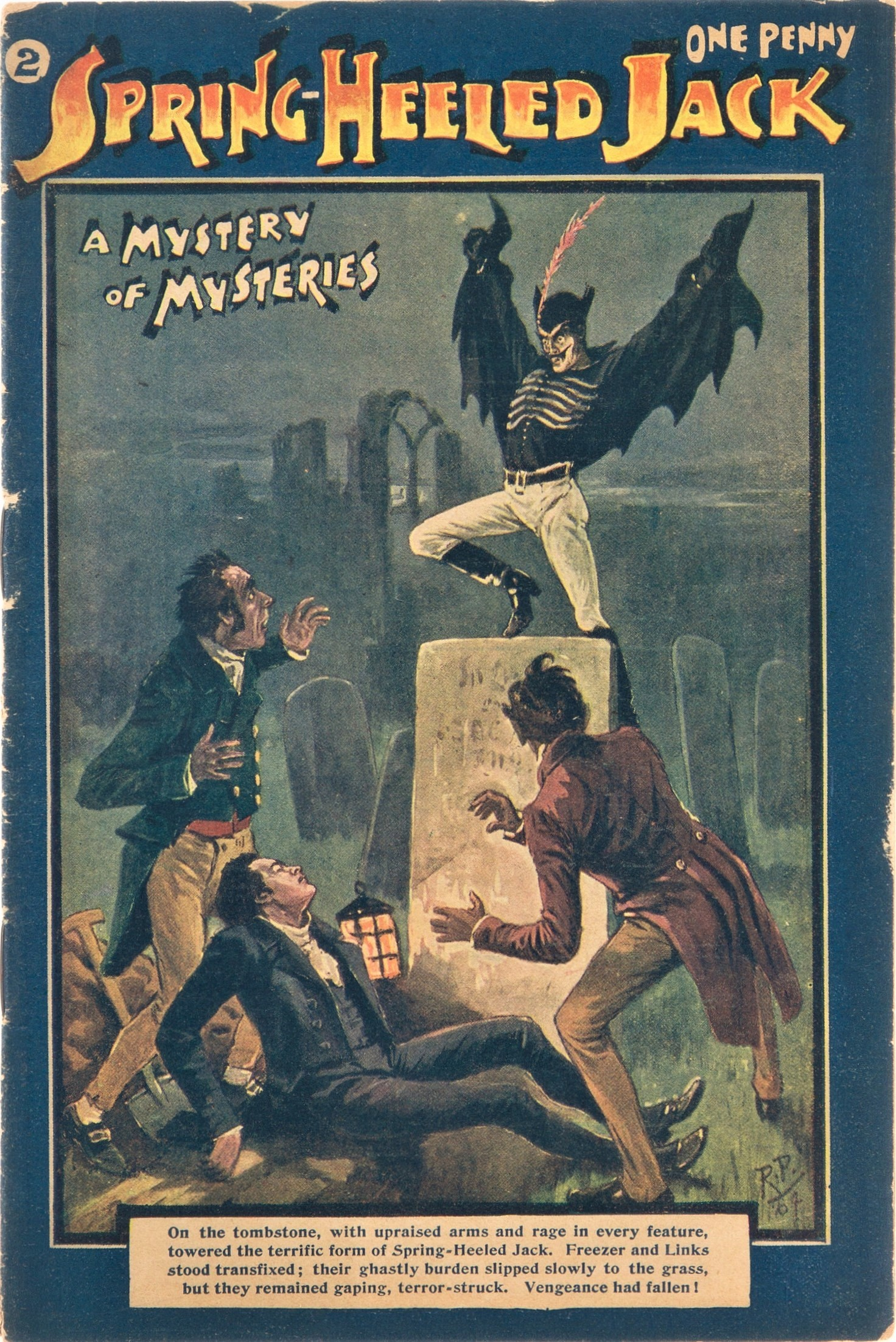
Spring Heeled Jack, the central character in the last three albums.

Scrubby, along with some of his companions who followed the little folk, survives the collapse of the mine. Having endured the trial by fire, he now emerges from the trial of earth. He succeeds in rescuing his friend Laura from the rubble by kissing her—a gesture that, unbeknownst to him, ultimately saves her life. Having lost his job as a child miner, he collects valuables from the bottom of the Thames to earn money to buy Laura a gift. He discovers that she has just been murdered near a tavern, amid a series of killings committed by a mysterious demonic figure, Spring Heeled Jack.

=== Les Lisières de l’ombre (The Edges of Shadow) ===
Scrubby has lost his beloved Laura. The killer Spring Heeled Jack is spreading terror, but the fairy child knows he is no ordinary murderer. While visiting the morgue, he encounters Sir Charles Warren and discovers that he was behind his father's murder. Following a recurring shadow, he uncovers a secret satanic society and decides to confront it.

=== La Nuit Asraï (The night of the Asraï) ===
Despite the death of Sir Charles Warren, Spring Heeled Jack (the demon he summoned with his cult) continues to attack London. Scrubby meets his alter ego, the real son of Thomas and Betty, who was abducted by the fairies, and who reveals to him his true nature as a changeling. He also explains that the boundary between the human world and the fairy world is becoming permeable. To defeat the Lord of Chaos, Scrubby must fully understand and accept the mystery of his origins, as well as his role as a guide and intermediary between the fairy realm and the world of humans. He learns that the faeries disappeared from the human world because they failed to choose between Good and Evil. To maintain their existence between angels and demons, they must offer a sacrifice to the Devil every hundred years; thus, a human child is abducted so the fairies do not have to offer one of their own. On the night of the Asraï, when the boundary opens, Scrubby saves his brother, who was promised as the sacrifice, and defeats the Lord of Chaos using a sword forged by his friends. He then permanently joins the world of the fae. The series concludes with the phrase, "It was in the long-ago time, when legends wandered among the eternities."

== Analysis ==
La Légende du Changeling is a Franco-Belgian semi-realistic comic series with a rather “slow and mesmerizing” pace. It is not quite a fantasy series, since it differs in that most of the action unfolds in a historical setting: Victorian England, a period both the writer and the illustrator are particularly familiar with. Characterized by being British in tone, La Légende du Changeling is rather dark and ethereal. Some passages are gloomy and cruel, others more lighthearted, blending “Celtic wonder and social naturalism.”

The story offers multiple levels of reading (Dubois is a storyteller who speaks just as easily to adults as to children). For children, it is a tale of the struggle between the fairy world and growing chaos; adult readers could perceive more of the social critique and symbolism throughout. The tone of the albums evolves: poetry and mystery of the little folk in the first, political dimension and social critique in the second, the fantastic and horror in the third and fourth, and an epic note in the final installment.

=== Commonalities and inspirations ===
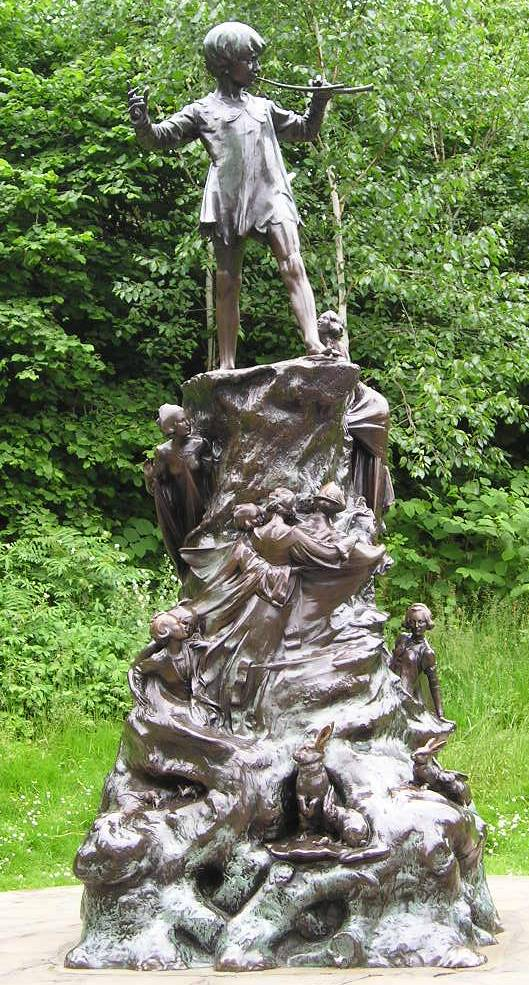
Statue of Peter Pan in Kensington Gardens: both the character and the location feature in The Legend of the Changeling.

In certain ways (such as its setting, the artist’s style, its fairy-tale genre, and the name “Scrubby”) the series is reminiscent of Peter Pan by Régis Loisel, though only a certain poetry links the two in plot and tone. Fourquemin and Smulkowski had already worked with the theme of old London in Miss Endicott, and there are clear similarities and a few nods between the two series. The story also shares common elements with Charles Dickens’ novels, such as Oliver Twist, particularly in its depiction of the child in Victorian society. When transposed to France, this theme recalls Émile Zola’s novels because of the harsh, difficult life Scrubby faces with a smile.

Dubois includes references to Jack the Ripper (of whom he is a noted expert), for example, through the presence of Sir Charles Warren, as well as other characters and works inseparable from Victorian London, especially those by Arthur Conan Doyle. A reference to Peter Pan appears when Scrubby discovers a theater performing Peter Pan in the second volume.

=== Initiatory dimension ===
Several reviewers and critics highlight the initiatory nature of the series. It takes on a metaphysical tone through its metaphor of the transition from childhood (Scrubby never grows up, as Dubois notes in an interview, because he is a sprite) to adolescence (Scrubby falls more or less in love, but his eternal childlike appearance alters how women perceive him). One of the central themes of Changeling—the quest for one’s origins, as exemplified by Scrubby’s desire to understand where he comes from—confers upon the series a depth that resonates universally. From the outset, Scrubby feels a profound connection to nature, a bond he progressively uncovers, particularly through his pursuit of his elusive “double.” His allies serve as guides throughout this journey, and the narrative strongly implies that they will unveil his true role and origins at the appropriate time.

According to Richard Ely, “at a time when [...] voices are rising to remind us of Nature, to denounce the false values imposed on us by industry,” this series “opens the door, shows the way, and serves as a true initiatory tale for both the hero Scrubby and the reader.” According to the site Sceneario.com, “The great strength of Pierre Dubois's story surely comes from its direct appeal to the collective unconscious. As such, Scrubby becomes an archetype in the Jungian sense, and La Légende du Changeling becomes a tale in the noblest sense of the term.” Dubois explains his desire to be inspired by folktales with Scrubby’s adventures, as he allies with the spirits of nature like the heroes of old stories who help wounded animals and are helped in return.

Another significant motif is the traversal of the four classical elements: earth is associated with the first volume (evoked by its brown-toned cover) and the second (through the ordeal in the mine); fire is also central to the second volume (symbolized by its red-toned cover and the mine fire); water emerges in the third volume (reflected in its blue-toned cover and the presence of a mysterious aquatic creature).

=== Critique of Victorian society ===
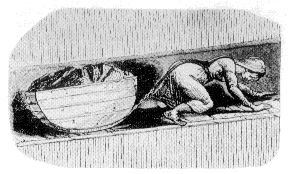
A young girl pulling a load of coal in a narrow mine tunnel. Taken from an official report by the English Parliament in the mid-19th century.

The series offers a social critique of Victorian England, where extreme wealth and extreme poverty coexist, and technological progress goes hand in hand with worsening social inequality. Victims of rural exodus fueled by the belief in a London “where there is work for all,” the poor (referred to as “hollow cheeks”) are exploited by a bourgeoisie living in luxury, with any revolt being bloodily suppressed. Several historical facts are touched upon, such as the rise of trade unionism, prostitution, and child labor in the mines. Scriptwriter Dubois states that Scrubby embodies childlike innocence, “the lost paradise that was trampled underfoot in the pursuit of profit.” He highlights the parallels between that era and our own, “where the poor are on one side, and the Bling-Bling on the other.” In that sense, according to him, La Légende du Changeling is not a “nostalgic” tale but uses the theme of the “child from elsewhere” to warn society that its “scientific and materialist” choices, which neglect spirituality and the initiatory path, are misguided.

=== Fairy world ===
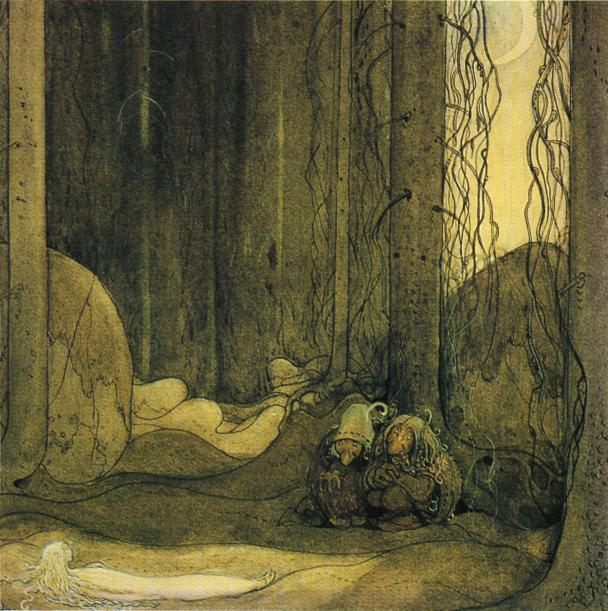
The myth of the changeling (here in an illustration by John Bauer in 1913) is central to The Legend of the Changeling.

In an interview, Illustrator Fourquemin states his desire to emphasize the contrast between industrialized, grimy London and the world of the fae. The opposition between London and the Dartmoor countryside symbolizes the clash between industrial modernity and ancient traditions, becoming an allegory of our era, where adults no longer perceive the beauty of magical worlds. This is one of Dubois’ favorite themes. In this sense, Changeling’s message echoes that of the short story The Old Woman Who Lived in a Shoe in his Comptines assassines: the need to return to wonder and nature, “the memory of a time when man and nature were one.” Fairy creatures are omnipresent in the forests; the trees themselves seem to evoke them in their shapes, and small fairies dance in circles among them. Ultimately, Dubois expresses the very essence of popular folklore surrounding the little people—the bond (often endangered) between humans and nature (their environment and their land).

The narrative grants a prominent role to English folklore concerning the fair folk. In addition to the myth of the changeling, other creatures are represented, such as those from the mines (Knockers), from the waters, as well as Spring Heeled Jack. Dubois draws on his extensive knowledge of legend and fairy lore (one legend about him claims that he is a child of the fairies himself), a changeling like his character Scrubby. The teachings given by the old hermit in the first volume provide an opportunity to introduce this theme, in which the author is a specialist. He offers a childlike perspective on this world through Scrubby’s eyes: even in the grimy city of London, Scrubby manages to “find a bit of nature” by taming rats or strolling through a park.

== Reception ==
According to Fourquemin, the series’ readers are mainly fans of fantasy, the Victorian universe, and Sherlock Holmes. There is little interaction between authors and readers.

=== Albums ===
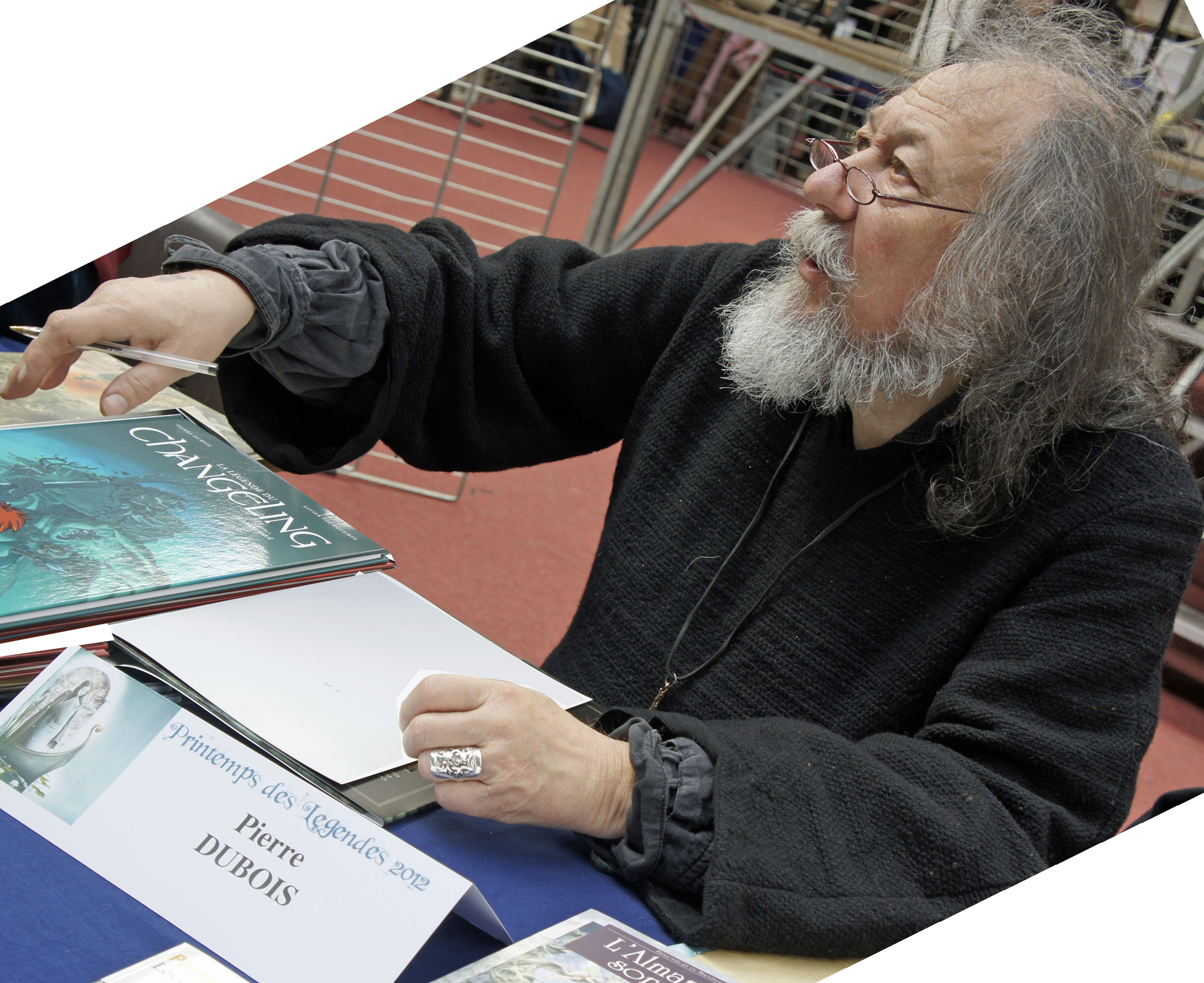
Pierre Dubois with the latest volume of La Légende du Changeling (The Legend of the Changeling) at the Printemps des Légendes festival in 2012.

The series has generally been well received: “[...] fantasy is in bad shape. [...] In this rather bleak context, a gem is occasionally born that alone rekindles the flame: The Legend of the Changeling is one of those. Carried by two formidable storytellers [...] The Legend of the Changeling is more than just a children's tale.” Planète BD describes it as “a must for lovers of fairy lore,” and ActuSF praises the “power of a universal tale.”

The first volume offers a “taster” described as captivating, “even if it doesn't show much originality in substance.” Laurent Lavadou from ActuSF calls it “a little gem of the ninth art” with an excellent storyline and steady pace, despite the recurring flaw of the first volumes in the series, namely that the plot unfolds slowly, slightly reducing the element of surprise. Planète BD criticizes the manichean aspect of the second volume, ActuSF laments that the third album focuses so heavily on the London murders, and Krinein BD finds the plot of the fourth volume somewhat weaker and more linear than the rest. Overall, the fourth volume is the least well-received of the five, due to its storyline.

=== Artwork and colors ===
Richard Ely states, “Pierre Dubois seems to have found a perfect illustrator in Xavier Fourquemin, who touchingly reveals the fairy world.” The illustrator matches the scriptwriter’s erudition by offering pages rich with creatures of the little folk. ActuSF calls Fourquemin a “wizard of line work,” whose skill with outlines and shadows allows the imagination to flourish, as do his atmospheric choices that avoid “hyper-realism.” The colors complement this, mostly using gradients.

Krinein BD describes a style well-suited to the atmosphere of 19th-century London, a blend of realism and fantasy, and praises Fourquemin’s ability to give distinctive “faces” to his characters that “reflect their social status.” According to Nicolas Anspach from Actua BD, Fourquemin “has reached a certain graphic maturity.” BDGest’ commends “the very recognizable graphic style of Xavier Fourquemin, between realism and caricature,” enhanced by subtle and intense colors. Planète BD asserts that the illustrator and colorist “excel in this historical-fantastical aesthetic.”

=== Script ===
Actua BD describes the script as “rich and original,” claiming the subject is well-handled and does not require prior knowledge of fairy folklore to be accessible. O. Boussin of BDGest’ highlights “endearing heroes,” a “meaningful initiatory quest,” integration of main and secondary plots, and an “engaging and dense storyline,” except for the last album, which he finds too light with its “forced” battle against the Lord of Chaos. Generally speaking, he pays tribute to “Pierre Dubois’ flair.” Benoît Cassel from Planète BD notes a very polished style, and emphasizes the “erudition and storytelling talent” of the scriptwriter. For ActuSF, Dubois’ narrative bubbles are nearly unique in the Celtic fantasy genre and demonstrate great erudition. This view is shared by Melville from Sceneario.com, who believes the scriptwriter’s sharing of knowledge is “the true strength” of the series within a very saturated genre. Due to his storytelling talent, Dubois “returns to the very essence of these ancient beliefs.” According to the reviewer, “the sincerity of this account profoundly resonates with the childlike sensibility that lies dormant within, rekindling the capacity for wonder in the face of the irrational.”

== See also ==
- Pierre Dubois
- Changeling

== Bibliography ==
=== Primary sources ===
- Dubois, Pierre; Fourquemin, Xavier; Smulkowski, Scarlett (2008). La Légende du Changeling [The Legend of the Changeling] (in French). Vol. 1: Le Mal-venu. Brussels/Paris: Le Lombard. ISBN 978-2-8036-2409-6.
- Dubois, Pierre; Fourquemin, Xavier; Smulkowski, Scarlett (2009). La Légende du Changeling [The Legend of the Changeling] (in French). Vol. 2: Le Croque-mitaine. Brussels/Paris: Le Lombard. ISBN 978-2-8036-2532-1.
- Dubois, Pierre; Fourquemin, Xavier; Smulkowski, Scarlett (2010). La Légende du Changeling [The Legend of the Changeling] (in French). Vol. 3: Spring Heeled Jack. Brussels/Paris: Le Lombard. ISBN 978-2-8036-2641-0.
- Dubois, Pierre; Fourquemin, Xavier; Smulkowski, Scarlett (2011). La Légende du Changeling [The Legend of the Changeling] (in French). Vol. 4: Les Lisières de l'ombre. Brussels/Paris: Le Lombard. ISBN 978-2-8036-2803-2.
- Dubois, Pierre; Fourquemin, Xavier; Smulkowski, Scarlett (2012). La Légende du Changeling [The Legend of the Changeling] (in French). Vol. 5: La Nuit Asraï. Brussels/Paris: Le Lombard. ISBN 978-2-8036-2996-1.

=== Secondary sources ===
- Van de Ponseele, Christophe (2010). "Interview Dubois – Fourquemin". Khimaira.
