= Son of the Morning (Emezi novel) =

2025 novel by Akwaeke Emezi

- Author: Akwaeke Emezi
- Language: English
- Genre: Speculative Romantasy
- Publisher: Avon
- Publication date: November 4, 2025
- Publication place: New York
- Media type: Print, e-book, audiobook
- Pages: 320
- ISBN: 9780063323186

Son of the Morning is a 2025 speculative romantasy novel by Nigerian writer Akwaeke Emezi. It was published in the United States by Avon, an imprint of HarperCollins. The novel marks Emezi's second foray into the romance genre, following You Made a Fool of Death with Your Beauty.

== Plot ==
The novel explores themes of magic, fantasy, identity, and destiny. It follows Galilee, who was raised by the Kincaid clan, a family of Black women. Throughout her life, Galilee has been aware that she is different and has carried the burden of a hidden secret surrounding her existence. Since childhood, she believed this unanswered mystery was something she would have to live with forever.

Everything changes when she meets Lucifer, the head of security for Oriaku's family. From the moment they encounter each other, both recognize that neither of them is entirely human. As their attraction deepens, they become entangled in a dangerous struggle involving Leviathan, whose rage and determination to eliminate Galilee threaten not only her life but also the lives of those she loves.

== Reception ==
Writing for Voice Magazine, Kaitlin Jefferys described the novel as an exploration of love, power, and the supernatural in the Black South, giving it a four starred review. Meanwhile, Kirkus Reviews, in their review, observed that the novel would likely become a favorite among many readers, though it criticized aspects of the plotting as uneven for a romance novel, arguing that the timeline was too compressed and the pacing occasionally too slow.

The novel was featured on The New York Times's list of 23 books to look forward to in November 2025.
