= Dear Senthuran =

2021 memoir by Akwaeke Emezi

Dear Senthuran: A Black Spirit Memoir
- First edition (US)
- Author: Akwaeke Emezi
- Language: English
- Genre: Memoir
- Publisher: Riverhead Books (US); Faber & Faber (UK)
- Publication date: June 8, 2021
- Publication place: Nigeria
- Media type: Print
- ISBN: 9780593329191
- Preceded by: The Death of Vivek Oji
- Website: Official website

Dear Senthuran: A Black Spirit Memoir is a 2021 memoir written by Nigerian author Akwaeke Emezi. It was first published in 2021 by Riverhead Books in the United States and Faber and Faber in the United Kingdom.

In 2022, it won the Israel Fishman Nonfiction Stonewall Book Award.

== Reception ==
A writer for The New York Times, Kim Tran, describes the book as “a metaphysical journey told through Igbo cosmology.” Akwaeke Emezi, who grew up in Aba, invites the reader to “imagine being ogbanje, like me.” Shondaland calls the author, “[One] of our greatest living writers.”

"Akwaeke Emezi writes transformative, transfixing letters to themselves in a magnificent reimagining of what a memoir can and should be," Times Magazine, in their 100 must read books of 2021.

"A full-throated and provocative memoir in letters from the New York Times-bestselling author of The Death of Vivek Oji, a dazzling literary talent whose works cut to the quick of the spiritual self," Esquire writes.
