= Little Rot =

2024 novel written by Akwaeke Emezi

- Author: Akwaeke Emezi
- Original title: Little Rot
- Language: English
- Genre: Fiction
- Set in: Nigeria
- Publisher: Riverhead Books
- Publication date: 4 July 2024
- Pages: 288

Little Rot is a 2024 novel written by Nigerian writer Akwaeke Emezi. This novel follows five friends who become ensnared in a mess of sex, lies, and corruption.

== Synopsis ==
Little Rot is set in the "elite underbelly of a Nigerian city". The story is about five friends who expect a fun night but end up facing chaos and excitement. The novel tells of a long-term couple, Aima and Kalu, who break up after a long time together.

Kalu, disturbed from his recent breakup with his partner Aima, attends a sex party thrown by a close friend of his, Ahmed. Little did he know, this choice would bring chaos and an unexpected, drastic shift in his life and his friends. In the midst of it all, two Nigerian sex workers, Ola and Suoraya, visiting from Kuala Lumpur, become entangled in the unfolding drama. Their drama sees them tangled in the city's shady underworld and a need to escape the dangerous threat.

== Characters ==
- Aima is the girlfriend of Kalu, whose decision brought chaos.
- Kalu is the boyfriend, who was hurt by the break up with his girlfriend.
- Ahmed is Kalu's best friend, who sets up the sex party.
- Ola is a sex worker who got entangled in the web of sex, lies, and corruption.
- Suoraya is a sex worker who got entangled in the web of sex, lies, and corruption.

== Reception ==
Chelsea Leu of The New York Times described the novel's ending as "particularly in the stomach-turning and dramatically perfect final twist that drags even the reader into complicity". Carol V. Bell, writing for the Los Angeles Times described Little Rot as "...a thrilling but difficult descent into darkness".

Chicago Review of Books and Kirkus Reviews stated, "Little Rot will take you on a pulsing ride beneath the surfaces of people, places, and things," and that it is " a contemporary romance for cynics and nihilists", respectively.
