= Bitter (novel) =

2022 young adult novel by Akwaeke Emezi

- First edition
- Author: Akwaeke Emezi
- Cover artist: Shyama Golden
- Language: English
- Genre: Young adult novel
- Publisher: Knopf/Random House Children's Books
- Publication date: 15 February 2022
- Publication place: Nigeria
- Pages: 272
- ISBN: 978-0-593-30903-2
- Followed by: Pet
- Website: www.akwaeke.com/bitter

Bitter is a young adult novel written by Nigerian writer Akwaeke Emezi and published by Knopf on 15 February 2022. A prequel to Emezi's Pet, Bitter tells the story of a Black teenage girl living in a city troubled by constant protests and violence.

== Plot ==
Bitter spent a majority of her youth in foster care. She was very thrilled when she was chosen to join Eucalyptus, a special school where she can focus on her painting while being surrounded by other exceptional kids. The regular social justice protests in the streets outside her school, on the other hand, give her concern. She escapes by drawing animals and bringing them to life. This hidden painting world allows her to escape reality, until one of her creatures develops venom and becomes violent. Bitter must do everything she can to stop the monster she made.

== Background ==
When Emezi first began writing Pet in 2017, they had planned for it to be part of a trilogy but eventually gave up on the idea. For Bitter, Emezi "wanted to write about revolution but community" and how people who might want to help don't necessarily need to be in the forefront.

== Reception ==
Kirkus Reviews gave the book a starred review, in which they highlight the "timely tension" present in Emezi's writing as the characters must decide "when and how to act in the face of unjustifiable state violence, among other societal atrocities." In addition, the reviewer noted how the various queer characters "receive love and support" from those around them. Publishers Weekly praised the characters, especially due to having "the agency to define the future for themselves and their city." They also called the main character, Bitter, "all the more memorable for her complexity."

Natalie Berglind, who reviewed for The Bulletin of the Center for Children's Books, called the novel timely due to "its mostly Black cast and escalating protests against an unjust world." Berglind also noted how it attempts to tackle the subject of using violence as "the means of disrupting long held power dynamics" and how the author does not provide an answer to related questions but instead hopes to provoke "thoughtful discussion." They conclude by saying "the ending is abrupt" but "offers tempered optimism to the teen who [...] feels immense frustration with a world unconcerned about their future."

Susan Harari, writing for Massachusetts' Youth Services Book Review, gives it 5 stars (out of 5) and recommends the book to "Readers who can appreciate Emezi’s subtlety and will be satisfied exploring questions with no easy answers;" she also suggested high schools and public libraries acquire the book.
