= Pet (novel) =

2019 young adult novel by Akwaeke Emezi

- First edition (US)
- Author: Akwaeke Emezi
- Illustrator: Shyama Golden
- Language: English
- Genre: fantasy, young adult, speculative fiction
- Publisher: Make Me A World (US); Faber & Faber (UK)
- Publication date: 2019
- Publication place: Nigeria
- Pages: 208
- ISBN: 978-0-525-64707-2
- Followed by: Bitter (novel)

Pet is a 2019 young adult fantasy/speculative fiction novel by Nigerian non-binary author Akwaeke Emezi. It was followed by a prequel Bitter, released in 2022.

== Background ==
With Pet, Emezi focused on writing the book they wanted to read while they were growing up. To them, including a Black trans girl character who was supported by her parents and community and who goes on adventures but is not in serious danger was particularly important.

Lucille, the setting of the novel, was inspired by settings that Toni Morrison used in her fiction. The town's creed ("We are each other’s harvest. We are each other’s business. We are each other’s magnitude and bond") is a quote from Gwendolyn Brooks' ode to Paul Robeson.

== Plot ==
Jam is a teen girl living in Lucille, a town in the US. Lucille is a type of utopia; its official historical record saw angels defeating monsters. In Lucille, there are no more monsters. Or so everyone believes. One day, Jam trips and falls onto her mother's painting (a type of assemblage with sharp objects incorporated within.) Jam's blood releases the creature that her mother painted: Pet. Pet informs Jam that it is here to hunt a monster living in Lucille.

== Characters ==
- Jam is the protagonist of the novel. A 15-year-old Black trans girl, she is selectively nonverbal. Jam is supported and loved by her family and community.
- Bitter is Jam's mother, a painter.
- Aloe is Jam's father.
- Redemption is Jam's friend, a boxer
- Pet is the creature conjured in a painting by Jam after she cut herself.
- Moss is Redemption’s brother
- Hibiscus is Redemption’s uncle
- Malachite is Redemption’s mother
- Beloved is Redemption’s father
- Whisper is Redemption’s parent
- Glass is Redemption’s aunt (Hibiscus’ wife)
- Ube is a librarian

== Themes ==
In an interview with Teen Vogue about the creation of the novel, Emezi noted that the contrast between growing up in Nigeria and spending time in the USA greatly influenced a major theme of the novel:

"But one of the things that I liked about growing up back home [in Nigeria] is that everyone's very blatant about what's happening. Like when the government's trying to kill you, the government's trying to kill you. Pet, so far, is my most American book, it's set in America, it's about America. Here, people aren’t really acknowledging what was happening around us, they’re not really looking directly at things."

The novel also deals with child sexual abuse, trust in the justice system, ideas around utopia and friendship, and bucking black and white thinking about evil. Communication styles are of particular importance in the novel, as well, as Jam is selectively nonverbal.

== Literary style ==
Jam communicates in several different ways throughout the novel, from verbally to non-verbal signing, to mental communication. These are presented in different textual formats in the novel.

== Publication history ==
Pet was on the inaugural publication list for the Make Me a World imprint of Penguin Random House, an effort led by children's author Christopher Myers. The imprint, focused on publishing diverse books, launched in fall 2019.

The novel was published by Faber & Faber in the UK, and by Farafina in Nigeria.

== Reception ==
In a starred review, Kirkus Reviews noted "this soaring novel shoots for the stars and explodes the sky with its bold brilliance." In a starred review at Publishers Weekly, the reviewer said "Emezi’s direct but tacit story of injustice, unconditional acceptance, and the evil perpetuated by humankind forms a compelling, nuanced tale that fans of speculative horror will quickly devour." The Horn Book Magazine called Pet "a haunting and poetic work of speculative fiction."

In a review for The New York Times, author Ibi Zoboi wrote that "Emezi, who is Nigerian, conjures the African oral tradition with sweeping metaphors folded into an almost folkloric rendering of some of humanity’s harshest truths."

Some school districts in the USA have banned the book for its LGBTQIA+ themes and exploration of identity and justice.

== Awards and recognition ==
Pet was a finalist for the 2019 National Book Awards for Young People's Literature and 2020 Lambda Literary Award for Children's and Young Adult Literature, as well as a Stonewall Book Award for Children's & Young Adult literature honor book. The American Library Association also included it on their 2020 Amelia Bloomer Book List.

Pet was named to Time magazine's list of 100 Best Fantasy Books of All Time. The New York Times named Pet one of the 25 best children's books of 2019. It received Walter Dean Myers Honor Book.
