= Akwaeke Emezi =

Nigerian writer and visual artist (born 1987)

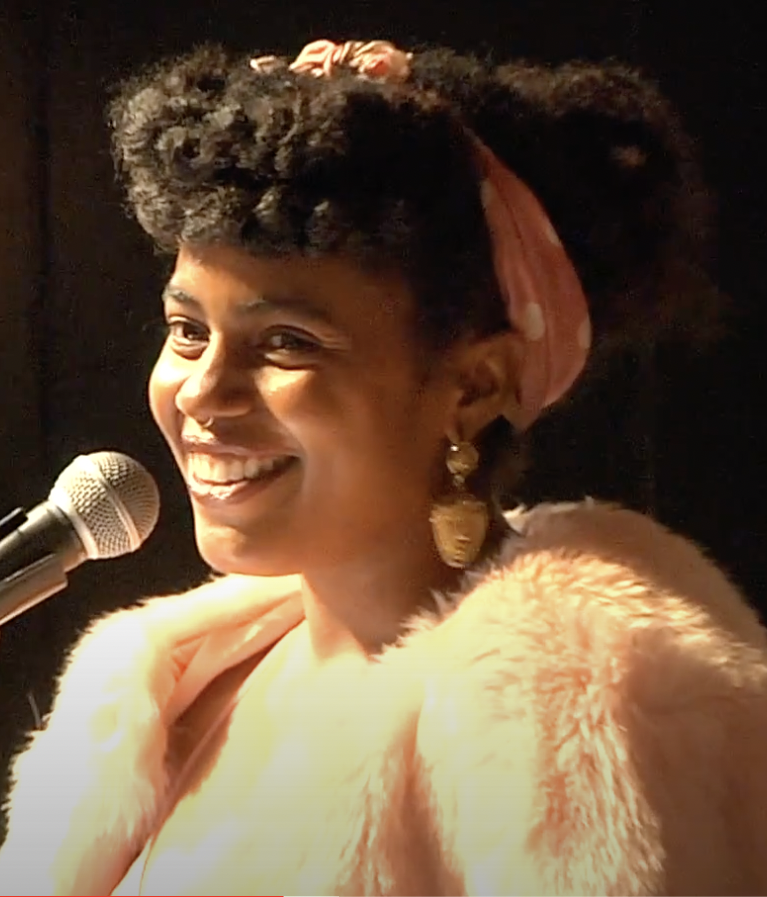
- Emezi in 2018
- Born: 6 June 1987 (age 39); Umuahia, Abia, Nigeria
- Education: New York University (MPA); Syracuse University (MFA)
- Occupations: Novelist, poet, visual artist
- Writing career
- Years active: 2017–present
- Genres: Fantasy and speculative; romance
- Notable works: Freshwater; Pet; The Death of Vivek Oji; Dear Senthuran
- Website: www.akwaeke.com

Akwaeke Emezi ( born 6 June 1987) is a Nigerian fiction writer and visual artist, best known for their novels Freshwater (2018), Pet, and the New York Times bestselling work The Death of Vivek Oji. Emezi is a generalist who writes speculative fiction, romance, memoir, and poetry for both young adults and adults with mostly LGBTQ themes. Their work has earned them several awards and nominations including the Otherwise Award and Commonwealth Short Story Prize. In 2021, Time featured them as a Next Generation Leader.

== Early life and education ==
Akwaeke Emezi was born in Umuahia, the capital city of Abia State, southeastern Nigeria in 1987 to an Igbo Nigerian father, and a mother who was the daughter of Sri Lankan Tamil immigrants living in Malaysia. Emezi grew up in Aba. Emezi started reading fantasy books and with their sister Yagazie used storytelling to escape the riots, dictatorship, and dangerous reality of their childhoods. Emezi was a "voracious" reader during childhood and they began writing short stories when they were five years old.

Emezi relocated to the Appalachian region of the United States when they were 16 years old to attend college. After college, they enrolled in a veterinary school and dropped out before receiving their MPA in international public policy and nonprofit management from New York University. Emezi briefly started a short-lived anonymous sex blog and a natural-hair blog which gave them little recognition. In 2014, they entered the MFA creative fiction writing program at Syracuse University where they started the draft of their debut novel Freshwater after which they attended Chimamanda Ngozi Adichie's Farafina Trust Creative Writing Workshop in Lagos State, southwestern Nigeria.

== Career ==
Emezi's debut novel Freshwater tells the semi-autobiographical story of the protagonist, Ada, who is an ogbanje (an Igbo evil spirit). Emezi explores their Igbo heritage's spirituality and gender alongside those of Western construction and invites their audience to think critically about this spirit/body binary.

Freshwater received significant critical acclaim and was longlisted for numerous prestigious awards. Emezi was also recognized as a 2018 National Book Foundation "5 Under 35" honoree.

In 2019, Freshwater was nominated for the Women's Prize for Fiction—the first time a non-binary transgender author has been nominated for the prize. Women's prize judge Professor Kate Williams said that the panel did not know Emezi was non-binary when the book was chosen, but she said Emezi was happy to be nominated. Non-binary commentator Vic Parsons wrote that the nomination raised uncomfortable questions, asking: "would a non-binary author who was assigned male at birth have been longlisted? I highly doubt it." After the nomination, it was announced that the Women's Prize Trust was working on new guidelines for transgender, non-binary, and genderfluid authors. The Women's Prize later asked for Emezi's "sex as defined by law" when submitting The Death of Vivek Oji for inclusion, and Emezi chose to withdraw, calling the requirement transphobic and specifically exclusionary to trans women.

Emezi's second novel and first young adult novel Pet, released on 10 September 2019, is about a transgender teenager named Jam living in a world where adults refuse to acknowledge the existence of monsters. Bitter, the prequel to Pet, was released in February 2022.

Emezi signed a two-book deal with Riverhead Books. The first, The Death of Vivek Oji, came out on 4 August 2020 and was a New York Times best seller. The second is a memoir entitled Dear Senthuran: A Black Spirit Memoir.

Emezi's debut poetry collection Content Warning: Everything was published in April 2022.

In April 2021, Deadline Hollywood announced that Amazon Studios won the right to adapt their debut romance novel You Made a Fool of Death with Your Beauty into a feature film. It was purchased in a high six-figure deal which Deadline called the biggest book deal of the year so far. Michael B. Jordan's Outlier Society will develop it alongside Elizabeth Raposo. Emezi will serve as the executive producer.

Emezi contributed "On Beauty" to the 2025 anthology Both/And: Essays by Trans and Gender-Nonconforming Writers of Color. The collection was edited by Denne Michele Norris with Electric Literature, and it became a finalist for the 2026 Lambda Literary Award for Transgender Nonfiction.

In June 2026, they announced the release of their eleventh book, marking their first full-length fantasy novel. Eclipse & the Wolf, a dark epic fantasy, is slated for publication in 2027 by Harper Voyager in the United States.

=== Other works ===
Emezi has written and directed short films, including Hey Celestial and Ududeagu. Ududeagu won the Experimental Short Audience Award at the 2014 edition of the BlackStar Film Festival.

In 2019, it was announced that Emezi will write and executive produce the TV series adaptation of their novel Freshwater for FX alongside Tamara P. Carter, to be produced by FX Productions with Kevin Wandell and Lindsey Donahue. In 2025, Emezi stated in an interview with Zikoko magazine that the project didn't get a green light and was returned to them in 2021, claiming that the market wasn't ready for spiritual West African storytelling.

In 2023, Emezi ventured into rap music, releasing their first single "Banye". In March 2024, Emezi released their debut EP Stop Dying, You Were Very Expensive.

== Personal life ==
Emezi is non-binary and transgender. They use they/them pronouns. They experience multiplicity and consider themself an ogbanje. They experienced their first alter split when they were 16, a week after moving to the United States. They have written about their experience of undergoing gender confirmation surgery, including hysterectomy.

== Awards and nominations ==
Year	Title	Award	Category	Result	Ref.
2017	—	Astraea Lesbian Foundation for Justice	Global Arts Fund Grant	Won	
2017	"Who Is Like God"	Commonwealth Short Story Prize	Africa	Won	
2018	Freshwater	The Brooklyn Public Library	Literary Prize	Nominated	
2018	Freshwater	Center for Fiction First Novel Prize	—	Shortlisted	
2019	Freshwater	Andrew Carnegie Medals for Excellence	Fiction	Longlisted	
2019	Freshwater	Aspen Words Literary Prize	—	Longlisted	
2019	Freshwater	Nommo Award	Novel	Won	
2019	Freshwater	Otherwise Award	—	Won	
2019	Freshwater	PEN/Hemingway Award	—	Finalist	
2019	Freshwater	Women's Prize for Fiction	—	Longlisted	
2019	Freshwater	Young Lions Fiction Award	—	Finalist	
2019	Pet	National Book Award	Young People's Literature	Finalist	
2020	Pet	Ignyte Award	Young Adult Novel	Finalist	
2020	Pet	Walter Dean Myers Award	Teen	Won	
2020	The Death of Vivek Oji	Goodreads Choice Awards	Fiction	Nominated–13th	
2020	The Death of Vivek Oji	Los Angeles Times Book Prize	Fiction	Shortlisted	
2021	The Death of Vivek Oji	Aspen Words Literary Prize	—	Longlisted	
2021	The Death of Vivek Oji	Audie Award	Literary Fiction & Classics	Won	
2021	The Death of Vivek Oji	Dylan Thomas Prize	—	Shortlisted	
2021	The Death of Vivek Oji	Nommo Award	Novel	Won	
2021	The Death of Vivek Oji	Orwell Prize	Political Fiction	Shortlisted	
2021	The Death of Vivek Oji	PEN/Jean Stein Book Award	—	Shortlisted	
2022	The Death of Vivek Oji	International Dublin Literary Award	—	Shortlisted	
2022	Dear Senthuran: A Black Spirit Memoir	Lambda Literary Awards	Nonfiction	Shortlisted	
2022	Dear Senthuran: A Black Spirit Memoir	Stonewall Award	Israel Fishman Nonfiction Award	Won	
2022	You Made a Fool of Death with Your Beauty	Goodreads Choice Awards	Romance	Nominated–12th	
2023	You Made a Fool of Death with Your Beauty	Audie Awards	Romance	Shortlisted	
2023	You Made a Fool of Death with Your Beauty	NAACP Image Awards	Fiction	Shortlisted	
2023	Bitter	ALA Rainbow Book List	—	Selected	
2023	Bitter	Locus Award	Young Adult	Shortlisted	

== Bibliography ==
=== Novels ===
- —— (2018). Freshwater: A Novel. New York: Grove Press. ISBN 9780802127358.
- —— (2020). The Death of Vivek Oji: A Novel. New York: Riverhead Books. ISBN 9780525541608.
- —— (2022). You Made a Fool of Death with Your Beauty: A Novel. New York: Atria Books. ISBN 9781982188702.
- —— (2024). Little Rot: A Novel. New York: Riverhead Books. ISBN 9780525541639.
- —— (2025). Son of the Morning: A Novel. New York: HarperCollins. ISBN 9780063323186.

=== Young adult novels ===
- —— (2019). Pet. New York: Make Me a World. ISBN 9780525647072.
- —— (2022). Bitter. New York: Knopf Books for Young Readers. ISBN 9780593309032.
- —— (2025). Somadina: A Novel. New York: Knopf Books for Young Readers. ISBN 9780593309070.

=== Nonfiction ===
- —— (2021). Dear Senthuran: A Black Spirit Memoir. New York: Riverhead Books. ISBN 9780593329191.
- —— (2025). "On Beauty". In Norris, Denne Michele; Electric Literature (eds.). Both/And: Essays by Trans and Gender-Nonconforming Writers of Color. HarperOne. ISBN 978-0-06341-437-2.

=== Poetry ===
- —— (2022). Content Warning: Everything. Port Townsend, Washington: Copper Canyon Press. ISBN 9781556596292.

== Themes and critical reception ==
Emezi's work includes themes of identity, spiritualism, trauma, and belonging, all explored through characters who experience dislocation from their identity. Reviewers have noted that Emezi weaves elements of realism and Igbo spiritual and cosmological perspectives into their stories, challenging the dominant narratives regarding concepts such as gender and identity. Emezi’s debut novel, Freshwater, was highly acclaimed for addressing themes of mental illness, spiritualism, and multiplicity through the perspective of Ada, a Nigerian woman and ogbanje. Emezi's novel The Death of Vivek Oji was also praised for its emotional depiction of grief, friendship, gender identity, and familial pressures in a Nigerian community.

Literary critics appreciate the contributions of the writer to contemporary African and diasporic literature, since Emezi discusses queer identity, spiritualism, and postcolonialism in their stories. Emezi's novels are considered to be groundbreaking in challenging traditional perceptions of identity and belonging.
