= The Death of Vivek Oji =

2020 novel by Akwaeke Emezi

- Author: Akwaeke Emezi
- Audio read by: Chukwudi Iwuji; Yetide Badaki
- Language: English
- Genre: Contemporary fiction
- Publisher: Riverhead Books
- Publication date: 4 August 2020
- Publication place: Nigeria
- Media type: Print, ebook, audiobook
- Pages: 248
- Awards: Nommo Award (2021)
- ISBN: 9780525541608

The Death of Vivek Oji is a novel by Nigerian writer Akwaeke Emezi. It was published on 4 August 2020 by Riverhead Books. The novel recounts the life and death of protagonist Vivek Oji. It is Emezi's second adult novel after Freshwater. The book received critical attention and was an instant New York Times best seller.

== Plot ==
A Nigerian man named Chika is married to an Indian immigrant, Kavita. They have one son, Vivek Oji, who was born on the day his grandmother Ahunna died. Vivek has a birthmark on his heel that matches a scar on Ahunna's foot. On the same day that a riot destroys a local marketplace, Kavita finds Vivek’s nude body wrapped in cloth and laid on her doorstep; the narrative then explores the years of Vivek’s life and death in a non-linear narrative. Vivek’s spirit occasionally comments on the narrative.

Vivek grows up with his cousin Osita. As a teenager, he begins experiencing blackouts. Osita’s parents Mary and Ekene (Chika’s brother) have an unhappy marriage. Osita generally spends most of his time at Vivek’s house. When a young Vivek is caught watching Osita have sex with his girlfriend Elizabeth, the boys quarrel. Osita does not speak to Vivek for several years.

As a young adult, Vivek’s parents withdraw him from university. Vivek has grown out his hair, which scandalizes their conservative community. Vivek is beaten during an attempted exorcism at Mary’s church. This shatters the relationship between Vivek’s parents and their extended family.

Vivek grows close to the daughters of the Nigerwives; these are immigrant women like Kavita who have married Nigerian husbands. These friends include Elizabeth and Juju, among others. Despite their conservative parents, the children of the Nigerwives have libertine attitudes toward relationships and sexuality. Osita and Vivek have sex. Juju and Elizabeth date in secret. After Vivek's death, Kavita begins interrogating the young women, believing that they can provide information about what happened. The women and Osita initially claim not to know what killed Vivek, but they later vote to tell Kavita the truth. That night, Osita and Juju have sex while Vivek’s spirit watches with approval.

Vivek’s friends give Kavita an envelope full of photos, revealing that Vivek enjoyed makeup and wearing dresses. Vivek used both “he” and “she” pronouns, sometimes presenting a feminine identity called Nnemdi. The girls tell Kavita that Vivek was likely killed during the riot when someone recognized him. Kavita and Chika are heartbroken to find that Vivek did not trust them. Kavita keeps the photos in an album under her mattress and asks Chika to replace Vivek’s headstone.

Osita visits Vivek's grave. Osita saw Nnemdi just as the riot was beginning. He tried to convince her that she was unsafe and that she should return to Juju’s house. Osita grabbed her arm; as she pulled away, she stumbled and fatally struck her head on the sidewalk. In a panic, Osita removed Nnemdi’s dress and left her on Kavita’s porch. Osita buries Nnemdi’s dress and leaves.

Nnemdi’s spirit comments from the afterlife. The tombstone now reads “Vivek Nnemdi Oji, Beloved Child”. Nnemdi has forgiven Osita and awaits reincarnation.

== Themes ==
The novel deals with self identity which the eponymous character Vivek faces as he comes to terms with his true identity and gender and believes he should be free to be who he is and what he wants without disturbances from others.

The novel explores the views of homosexuality in Nigeria as it is a criminal offence and the stigma attached to it. It also talks about closeted gay people who are afraid of coming out and are yet to come in terms with their sexuality.

== Reception ==
The book received generally positive reception with several media outlet including The New York Times, The Washington Post, NPR, USA Today, praising Emezi's creativity.

It was an instant New York Times bestseller. In a positive review the Los Angeles Times called it "a relatively slim book that contains as wide a range of experience as any saga". The New York Times Book Review called the novel “[A] dazzling, devastating story ... A puzzle wrapped in beautiful language, raising questions of identity and loyalty that are as unanswerable as they are important.”

A starred review by the Kirkus Reviews called it "Vividly written and deeply affecting".

== Awards ==
The Death of Vivek Oji was longlisted for the 2021 Aspen Words Literary Prize. The novel won the 2021 Nommo Award for best novel.

| Year | Award | Category | Result | Ref |
|---|---|---|---|---|
| 2020 | Goodreads Choice Awards | Fiction | Nominated–13th | |
| 2020 | Los Angeles Times Book Prize | Fiction | Shortlisted | |
| 2021 | Aspen Words Literary Prize | — | Longlisted | |
| 2021 | Audie Award | Literary Fiction & Classics | Won | |
| 2021 | Dylan Thomas Prize | — | Shortlisted | |
| 2021 | Nommo Award | Novel | Won | |
| 2021 | Orwell Prize | Political Fiction | Shortlisted | |
| 2021 | PEN/Jean Stein Book Award | — | Shortlisted | |
| 2021 | Stonewall Book Awards | Stonewall Book Award-Barbara Gittings Literature Award and Stonewall Book Award-Israel Fishman Non-Fiction Award. | Honor(s) | |
| 2022 | International Dublin Literary Award | — | Shortlisted | |
