= Iyi-uwa =

Object used to bind the spirits of dead children in Igbo mythology

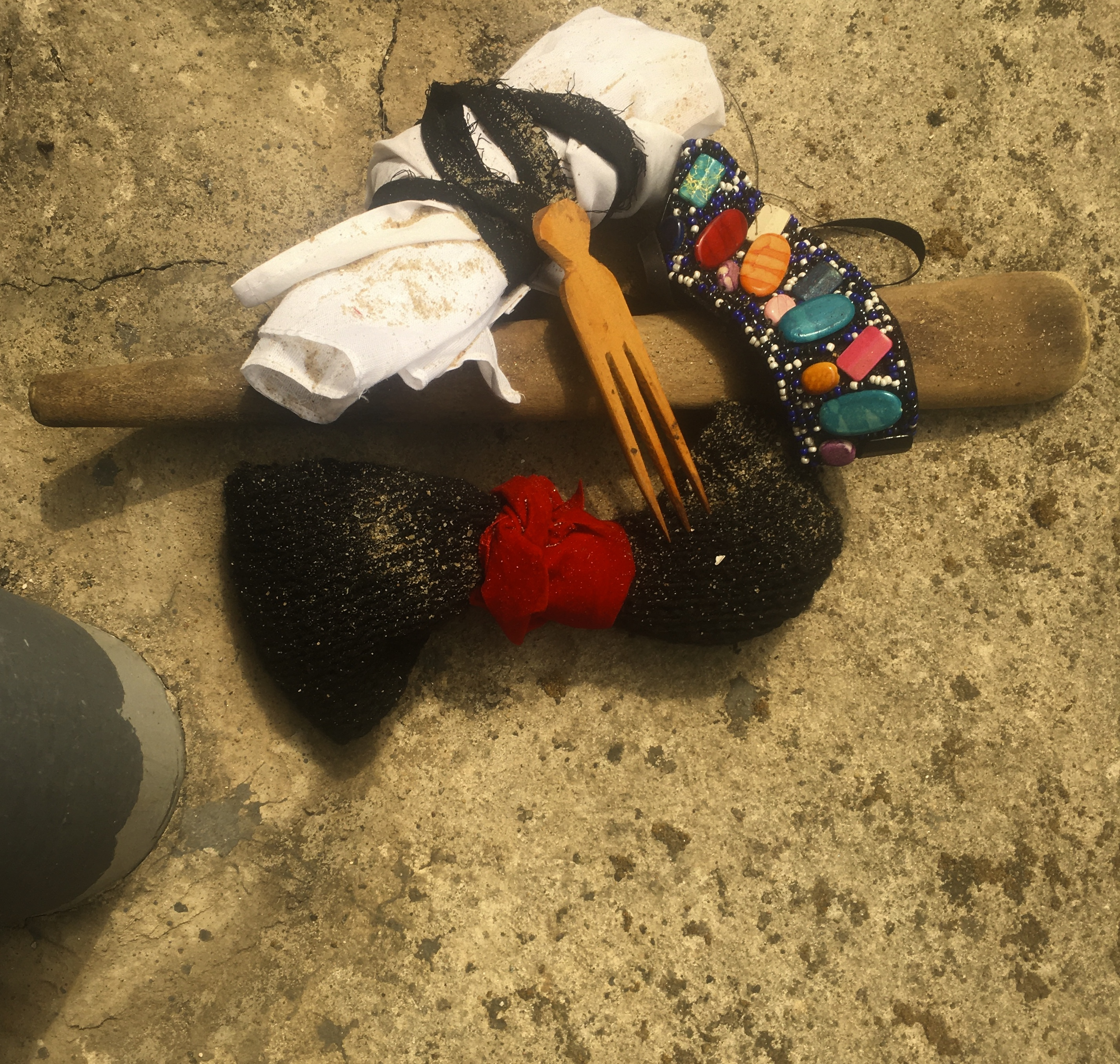
Ịyi Ụwa items

An Iyi-uwa is an object from Igbo mythology that binds the spirit of a dead child (known as ogbanje) to the world, causing it to return and be born again to the same mother.

Many objects can serve the purpose of iyi-uwa, including stones, dolls, hair or pieces of the dead child's clothes, omens, or offerings. The iyi-uwa must be found and destroyed in order for the ogbanje to rest and stop haunting the mother. To find the object, shamans known as 'dibia' question the spirit and perform rituals to force it to reveal where the iyi-uwa is located.

The novel Things Fall Apart by Nigerian author Chinua Achebe contains a detailed subplot involving an ogbanje child and her iyi-uwa.
