= You Made a Fool of Death with Your Beauty =

2022 novel by Akwaeke Emezi

- First edition
- Author: Akwaeke Emezi
- Audio read by: Bahni Turpin
- Language: English
- Genre: Romance novel
- Publisher: Atria Books (US); Faber & Faber (UK)
- Publication date: 24 May 2022 (US); 26 May 2022 (UK)
- Publication place: United States; United Kingdom
- Media type: Print, ebook, audiobook
- Pages: 336 pp.
- ISBN: 9781982188702 (hardcover 1st ed.)
- Dewey Decimal: 823/.92
- LC Class: PR9387.9.E42 Y68 2022

You Made a Fool of Death with Your Beauty is a 2022 romance novel by Nigerian writer Akwaeke Emezi. It is Emezi's first romance novel and third adult novel, and it follows Feyi Adekola, a Nigerian American visual artist, as she heals from the trauma of widowhood and finds new love.

== Background ==
The novel is Emezi's first romance novel and they stated that the novel was partly inspired by the Florence + the Machine song "Hunger". Emezi pulled the title of the book from the song lyrics after trying alternative names for the novel which they felt didn't fit. While writing the novel, they did not want it to fall under the regular trope of romance novels and instead made it about an illicit love triangle. Emezi wrote the novel with a queer gaze and also had it feature a supportive queer friendship. They deviated from the typical heterosexual romance trope by making it a romance involving queer characters, with the main characters Feyi and Alim being bisexual and Joy being a lesbian. Feyi's art in the novel is also based on Emezi's experience as a visual artist.

== Reception ==
The book received generally positive critical acclaim and reception. It was the most anticipated book of 2022 by multiple media outlets including Vogue, Thrillist, Essence, The Washington Post and Vulture. For British Vogue, Olivia Marks praises the book: “Akwaeke Emezi has taken on the romance genre to deliver an unforgettable tale of modern love—and one of this year’s most sizzling reads.”

The New York Times Book Review praised the novel calling it "[A]n unabashed ode to living with, and despite, pain and mortality…and it could appeal especially to people who, living through an isolating pandemic that has accelerated loss, hunger for more joie de vivre." A review from PopSugar called the novel "A riveting and emotional exploration of grief and taking a second chance on love." Publishers Weekly noted that it "...is sure to tug at readers' heartstrings."

== Adaptation ==
In April 2021, Deadline Hollywood announced that Amazon Studios won the right to adapt You Made a Fool of Death with Your Beauty into a feature film. It was purchased in a high six figure deal which Deadline called the biggest book deal of the year so far. Michael B. Jordan's Outlier Society will develop it alongside Elizabeth Raposo. Emezi will serve as the executive producer.

== Awards and honours ==
- Goodreads Choice Award - Nominee for Reader's Favorite Romance (2022)
- New York Times - Best Romance Novels of 2022 (Honor)
- Washington Post - Best Romance Novels of 2022 (Honor)
- NAACP Image Award - Best Fiction (2023)
