= Ogbanje =

Spirit in Igbo mythology

An ọgbanje is a term in Odinani (Igbo: ọ̀dị̀nànị̀) for what was thought to be an evil spirit that would deliberately plague a family with misfortune. Belief in ọgbanje in Igboland is not as strong as it once was, although there are still some believers.

Its literal meaning in the Igbo language is "children who come and go". Sometimes the word ọgbanje has been used as a synonym for a rude or stubborn child. The word ọgbanje is often translated as changeling, due to the similarities they share with the fairy changelings of Celtic and broader European mythology. Some theorists have hypothesized that these conceptions serve as mythological ways of understanding what were once unknown diseases that often claimed the lives of children (such as SIDS and sickle cell disease), as the inheritance of these diseases within families may have led people to conclude that the children involved were all incarnations of the same malevolent spirit.

It was believed that within a certain amount of time from birth (usually not past puberty), the ọgbanje would deliberately die and then be reborn into the next child of the family and repeat the cycle, causing much grief. It is also believed that ọgbanje are not always born into the same immediate family, but can even be born into an extended family. Ogbanje can be born into family from a spirit between gestation and birth. Another way is by being introduced to an ọgbanje group.

The evil spirits are said to have stones called iyi-uwa, which they bury somewhere secret. The iyi-uwa serves to permit the ọgbanje to return to the human world and to find its targeted family. Finding the evil spirits' iyi-uwa ensures the ọgbanje would never again plague the family with misfortune. The iyi-uwa is dug out by a priest and destroyed. The child is confirmed to no longer be an ọgbanje after the destruction of the stone, or after the mother successfully gives birth to another baby. Female ọgbanje die during pregnancies along with the baby, while male ọgbanje die before the birth or death of a wife's baby.

To prevent the ọgbanje from returning after the child's death, they would be cut or mutilated. Some ọgbanje, however, were said to return bearing the physical scars of the mutilation. Female circumcision was sometimes thought to get rid of the evil spirit. Trying to identify an ọgbanje that lacks mutilation scars can sometimes be difficult. Other things that have helped families identify them are birthmarks the child had, the first words they said, and behavior similarities from the child that has been reincarnated. Families paid a lot of attention to these types of characteristics, and most of the time would go to an oracle to confirm that the child was an ọgbanje. Another sign of an ọgbanje is a child who frequently becomes very ill, or is often in trouble.

== In popular culture ==
- In the critically acclaimed novel by Chinua Achebe, Things Fall Apart (1958), the character Ezinma was considered an ọgbanje because she was the only one of 10 children born to her mother that did not die in infancy.
- In the novel Freshwater by Akwaeke Emezi (2018), the main character, Ada, is an ọgbanje
- In Francesca Ekwuyasi's Scotiabank Giller Prize-nominated novel Butter Honey Pig Bread (2020), the character Kambirinachi believes that she is an ọgbanje.
- In Ben Okri's Booker Prize-winning novel, The Famished Road (1991), as well as in the two other books in his trilogy, Songs of Enchantment (1993) and Astonishing the Gods (1995), the character Azaro is a spirit child, or ogbanje, who travels between worlds.

== See also ==
- Abiku
- Akwaeke Emezi
