= Freshwater (novel) =

2018 novel by Akwaeke Emezi

- Freshwater
- Author: Akwaeke Emezi
- Language: English
- Genre: Fiction, Autobiography
- Publisher: Grove Press
- Publication date: 13 February 2018
- Publication place: Nigeria
- Awards: Nommo Award, Otherwise Award
- ISBN: 9780802128997

Freshwater is a 2018 autobiographical fiction novel by Nigerian writer Akwaeke Emezi. Emezi's debut novel, it tells the story of Ada, a girl with multiple ogbanje dwelling inside her.

Freshwater won both the Nommo Novel Award and Otherwise Award in 2019, and was nominated for several other awards and prizes.

== Plot ==
Freshwater tells the semi-autobiographical story of the protagonist, known to the reader as 'The Ada'. The main narratorial voice of the novel is ogbanje, spirits from Igbo religion, that occupy the Ada, and manifests in multiple distinct and characterised personalities, both helpful and antagonistic.

The plot follows a fragmented account of the Ada's life. The first segment of the novel discusses the Ada's birth and the nature of the ogbanje. This is followed by a general account of her childhood in Nigeria, including Christianity and distant parents. This section is narrated in plural first person by the dormant ogbanje living inside her.

As a teenager, the Ada moves to the United States to study biology, where her college boyfriend, Soren, repeatedly rapes her. The trauma of this event causes the dormant ogbanje to change inside her, leading to the development of a unique ogbanje personality known as Asughara. Asughara harms the Ada's body to please the ogbanje spirits that reside in her. At the same time, another personality known as St Vincent emerges, who is male, calmer, and initially quiet. Following the emergence of these unique ogbanje personalities, there is a constant struggle for control over the Ada's life, and when the ogbanje seize control, they engage in self-destructive behavior, including self-harm, mastectomy, hypersexuality, and alcohol abuse.

The plot climaxes as Asughara attempts to kill the Ada, which is seen as both murder from one personality to another, and also as suicide. The attempt fails, and after the Ada's hospitalisation, she travels back to Nigeria for the closing action of the story, where she connects with a shaman.

In the final section of the novel, the Ada reflects on her personalities and the nature of the ogbanje in an introspective manner, as she gains a sense of wholeness to her identity. She also discloses abuse she experienced as a child.

== Themes ==
The story of Freshwater is broken up and fragmented through both time and narratorial voice. The narrator often changes between chapter, between the initial first person plural of the ogbanje, Asughara, St Vincent, and eventually the Ada herself, who doesn't gain a voice in her own story until well into the novel. The organisation of the story within the novel is arranged so that the action is more centred around the ogbanje's journey and conflict than the Ada's.

Emezi explores their Igbo heritage's views on spirituality and gender roles alongside those of Western construction and invites readers to think critically about the spirit/body binary.

== Reception ==
The New Yorker called Freshwater "a startling début novel"; The Guardian called it "a remarkable debut"; and the LA Times called it "dazzling". Freshwater was longlisted for numerous significant awards. Freshwater was a New York Times Notable Book, was named a Best Book of the Year by the New Yorker and NPR. Emezi is also recognized as a 2018 National Book Foundation "5 Under 35" honoree.

In 2019, Freshwater was nominated for the Women's Prize for Fiction — the first time a non-binary transgender author has been nominated for the prize. Chair of judges Kate Williams said that the panel did not know Emezi was non-binary when the book was chosen, but she said Emezi was happy to be nominated. After the nomination, the Women's Prize Trust formulated new guidelines for transgender authors, and as of 2020 requires authors to be "legally female" without regard to either sex or gender identity.

== Controversy ==
The first editions of "Freshwater" name-dropped Emezi's work with Nigerian author and feminist Chimamanda Ngozi Adichie. After Emezi posted tweets regarding Adichie and her alleged transphobia in 2021, Adichie asked that all references to her name be removed from the "about the author" section of the book jacket on all future copies of Freshwater.

== Adaptation ==
In May 2019, news announced that the novel was optioned by FX for a TV series adaptation. Emezi was scheduled to write the screenplay and executive produce the series with Tamara P. Carter. FX Productions planned to produce it alongside Kevin Wandell and Lindsey Donahue. In 2025, Emezi stated in an interview with Zikoko Magazine that the project didn’t get a green light and was returned to them in 2021, with the claim that the market wasn’t ready for spiritual West African storytelling.

== Awards ==
Year	Award	Category	Result	Ref.
2018	The Brooklyn Public Library	Literary Prize	Nominated	
2018	Center for Fiction First Novel Prize	—	Shortlisted	
2019	Andrew Carnegie Medals for Excellence	Fiction	Longlisted	
2019	Aspen Words Literary Prize	—	Longlisted	
2019	Nommo Award	Novel	Won	
2019	Otherwise Award	—	Won	
2019	PEN/Hemingway Award	—	Finalist	
2019	Women's Prize for Fiction	—	Longlisted	
2019	Young Lions Fiction Award	—	Finalist	
