= Chantal =

Chantal (UK: /ʃɒ̃ˈtɑːl, -ˈtæl, ʃænˈ-/, US: /ʃɑːnˈtɑːl/, French: [ʃɑ̃tal]) is a feminine given name of French origin. The name Chantal can be traced back to the Old Occitan word cantal, meaning "stone". It came into popular use as a given name in honor of the Catholic saint, Jeanne de Chantal. It may also be spelled Chantel, Chantalle, Chantelle, Shantal, Shantel, Chanté, Shantelle, or Shontelle usually in the USA.

== Chantal ==
- Chantal Akerman (1950–2015), Belgian filmmaker
- Chantal Andere (born 1972), Mexican actress
- Chantal Botts (born 1976), South African badminton player
- Chantal Chamandy, Canadian singer
- Chantal Chawaf (born 1943), French writer
- Chantal Coché (1826–1891), Belgian industrialist
- Chantal Claret (born 1982), American singer
- Chantal Da Silva, Canadian journalist residing in the United Kingdom
- Chantal Demming (born 1978), Dutch actress
- Chantal Deruaz (1949–2026), French actress
- Chantal Fontaine (born 1965), Canadian actress
- Chantal Galladé (born 1972), Swiss politician
- Chantal Garrigues (1944–2018), French actress
- Chantal Gondang, Cameroonian dancer and choreographer
- Chantal Goya (born 1942), French singer and actress
- Chantal Grevers (born 1961), Dutch cricketer
- Chantal Groot (born 1982), Dutch swimmer
- Chantal Jaquet (born 1956), French philosopher and professor
- Chantal Joffe (born 1969), English painter
- Chantal Kreviazuk (born 1974), Canadian singer-songwriter
- Chantal Lemercier-Quelquejay (1926-2018), French historian
- Chantal Mauduit (1964–1998), French alpine skier
- Chantal Mbakeshimama, Rwandan politician
- Chantal Michel (born 1968), Swiss artist
- Chantal Mouffe (born 1943), Belgian political theorist
- Chantal Nijkerken-de Haan (born 1973), Dutch politician
- Chantal Passamonte (born 1970), South African electronic musician, better known as Mira Calix
- Chantal Quesnel, Canadian actress
- Chantal Réga (born 1955), French sprinter
- Chantal Regnault, French photographer
- Chantal Renaud (born 1946), Canadian script writer
- Chantal Rossi, Canadian politician
- Chantal Serre (1950–2015), French footballer
- Chantal Singer, Canadian waterskier
- Chantal Spitz (born 1954), French Polynesian author
- Chantal Strand (born 1987), Canadian voice actress
- Chantal Strasser (born 1978), Swiss freestyle swimmer
- Chantal Sutherland (born 1976), Canadian model, television personality, and jockey
- Chantal Ughi (born 1981), Italian female kick boxer, actress, and multiple Muay Thai champion
- Chantal Vantomme, fictional character in two Belgian TV series Eigen Kweek (2013, 2016, 2019) and Chantal (2022, 2024)
- Chantal Videla (born 2002), Filipino-Argentine actress, model, and singer of K-pop girl group Lapillus
- Marie-Chantal, Crown Princess of Greece (born 1968), the wife of Pavlos, a crowned prince of Greece

== Chantalle ==
- Chantalle Ng (born 1995), Singaporean actress
- Chantalle Zijderveld (born 2000), Dutch swimmer

== Shantal ==
- Shantal Munro-Knight, Barbadian politician
- Beatriz Shantal, Mexican actress, singer, and model
- Ran Shantal (born 1971), Israeli Olympic competitive sailor

== Shantel ==
- Stefan Hantel, stage name Shantel (born 1968), German DJ and producer
- Shantel Jordan, U.S. figure skater
- Shantel Kay (1991–2024), an alias of Nigerian sex worker and LGBTQ activist
- Shantel Krebs (born 1973), American businesswoman and former South Dakota Secretary of State
- Shantel Rivard, the first coach for the University of North Dakota's Fighting Sioux women's hockey team
- Shantel VanSanten (born 1985), American actress and model

== Shantelle ==
- Shantelle Larissa Malawski (born 1986), Canadian professional wrestler with the ring name Taylor Wilde

== Shontelle ==
- Shontelle Layne (born 1985), Barbadian singer better known mononymously as Shontelle
