= Veso Golden Oke =

Nigerian transgender model

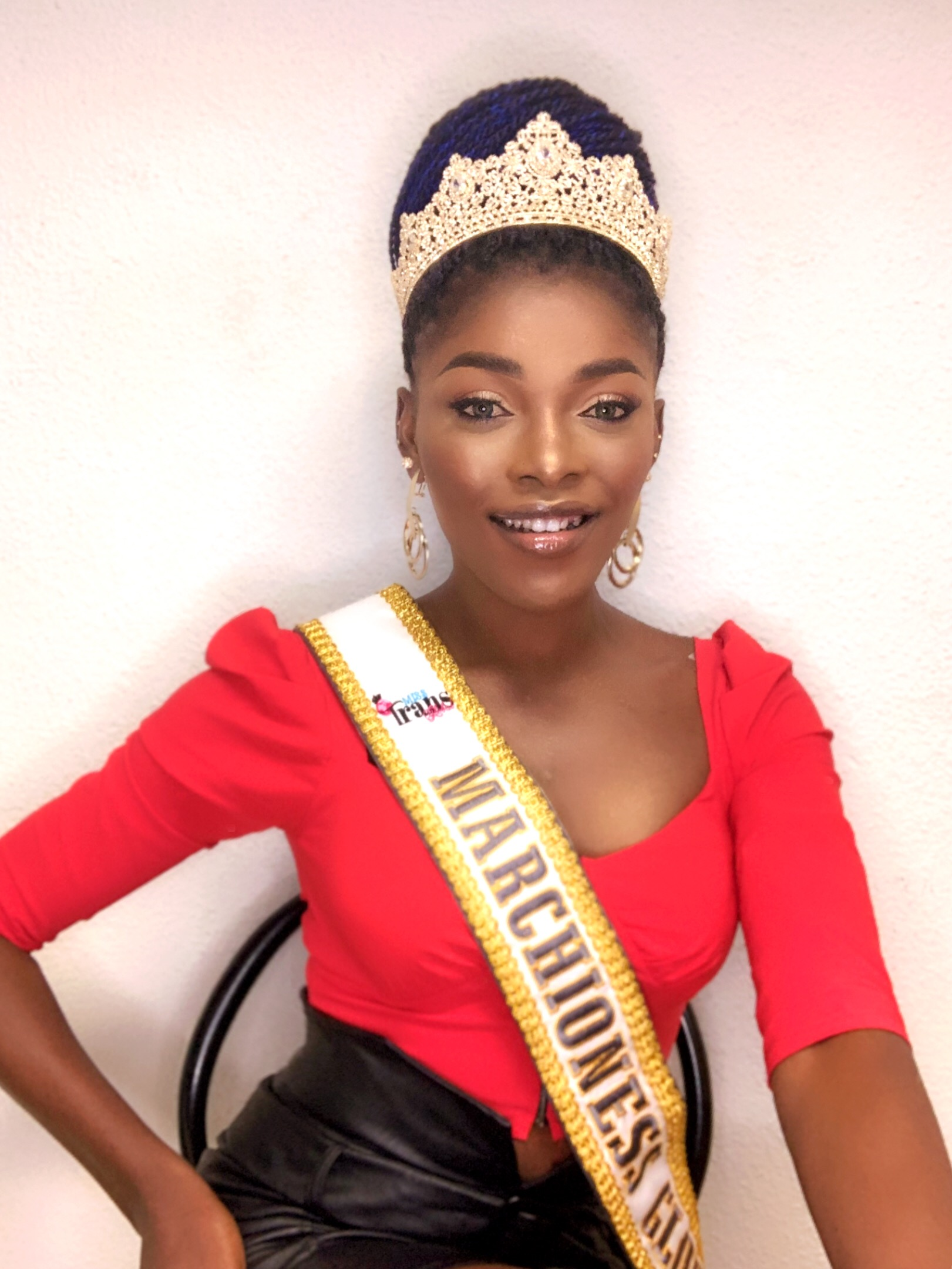
- Veso Golden after being crowned Marchioness Global at Miss Trans Global 2020.
- Born: Nigeria
- Citizenship: Nigerian; Ghanaian
- Occupations: Model, Actress, Activist, entrepreneur

Veso Golden Oke (born March 3, 1994) is a Nigerian transgender model, make-up artist and hairstylist. In 2019, she became the first openly transgender woman to compete in a beauty pageant in Africa. Then, she was crowned Miss Start International on October 15, 2023, in Santana Susanna, Barcelona, Spain.

== Early life ==
Oke was born to a Nigerian father and a Ghanaian mother. She was raised Anglican.

As a child, Oke was feminine and has always felt that she was a woman; never identifying as a gay man. She has recalled that at age 8, she used to pray she would wake up in a girl's body. At age 14, she learned online about transgender identity and came to terms with her own identity. Although initially when she came out her family thought "the devil had taken over her," her parents soon became supportive.

== Career ==
In 2014, Oke left Nigeria and moved to Ghana. There, she began working as a model and mentor to models in Accra.

In August 2019, Oke competed in Miss Europe Continental, a beauty pageant being held in Ghana.

== Personal life ==
By 2018 Oke was on hormone replacement therapy.

Before coming out as transgender, Oke dated women in the hope that being sexual with them might help "kill [her] feminine side". She has not shared anything about her current relationship status, only that she is interested in dating men.

On her mother's advice, Oke left Nigeria for Ghana following the 2014 anti-LGBT+ law.

She hopes that one day, Nigeria will recognize trans people for who they are, and that they will gain more visibility and acceptance.

== See also ==
- Bobrisky – Nigerian transgender woman (born 1991)
- Jay Boogie – Nigerian transgender woman (born 1998)
- Miss Sahhara – Nigerian beauty queen and LGBTQ advocate
- Noni Salma – Nigerian transgender woman
