= Chantal (disambiguation) =

Chantal is a French feminine given name.

Chantal may also refer to:

== Places ==
- Chantal, Sud, Haiti, a commune
  - Chantal, Chantal, Haiti, a town in the commune
- Chantal Range, in Chukotka, Russia

== Other uses ==
- Jane Frances de Chantal (1572–1641), French saint
- MV Chantal (1935), a Panamanian cargo ship in service 1975–78
- Tropical Storm Chantal, various storms
- 1707 Chantal, an asteroid
- Chateau Chantal, a winery in Michigan
- Chantal, a 1992 album by Chantal Andere

== See also ==
- Chantel, a given name
- Chantelle (disambiguation)
