= Chatelain =

Chatelain may refer to:

- Châtelain, the French equivalent of the English castellan, i.e. the commander of a castle
- Chatelain (surname)
- Châtelain, Mayenne, a commune in the Mayenne department in north-western France
- Camblain-Châtelain, a commune in the Pas-de-Calais department in the Nord-Pas-de-Calais region of France
- Lignières-Châtelain, a commune in the Somme department in Picardie in northern France
- USS Chatelain (DE-149), a destroyer escort built for the U.S. Navy during World War II

== See also ==
- Chatelaine (disambiguation)
- Chastel (disambiguation)
- Chastellain
- Chatel (disambiguation)
- Chateau (disambiguation)
