= Jay Boogie =

Nigerian transgender woman (born 1998)

- Born: 26 June 1998 (age 27); Port-Harcourt, Nigeria
- Occupation: Social media personality

Jay Boogie (born 26 June 1998) is a Nigerian transgender fashion enthusiast, brand influencer and social media personality who founded JaySecrets. She became famous on Instagram in her early twenties, with her gender transition gaining attention from Nigerians on social media platforms. Boogie has been listed among the top five crossdressers in Nigeria alongside Bobrisky and James Brown.

== Early life and education ==
Boogie was born in Port-Harcourt, Rivers State but hails from Akwa Ibom state. Boogie was born male but has identified as a girl from a young age. Boogie attended Methodist Comprehensive High School Port-Harcourt, Rivers State University and Akwa Ibom State University, Uyo. In 2021, she took to Instagram to share the news of her mother’s passing.

== Career ==
Boogie is being sponsored by Queen Peace Michael, a commercial model and winner of Face of Nigeria. She owns a fashion company Jay Brushes, which sells make-up kits, and JaySecrets, a beauty consultancy company which also offers beauty products. Boogie is also a dancer and has modeled for different brands across Nigeria.

== Controversies ==
Boogie sought support from Nigerians due to complications arising from her BBL surgery. She appealed for financial assistance, citing health issues including kidney complications and the need for corrective procedures. Her plea led to the creation of a GoFundMe worth $6,000 to cover her medical expenses.

However, doubts surfaced when those managing the fundraiser expressed concerns about the authenticity of Jay’s medical claims. They requested verifiable medical reports, but Jay seemed hesitant to provide them, leading to suspicions of potential deception. She received support from Bobrisky, who used her platform to speak out after Nollywood actress Sonia Ogiri criticized Jay Boogie. Bobrisky wrote, “No one deserves to face a life-threatening situation because of their lifestyle choices.”

After the surgery, during an interview Boogie apologized to those who felt misled, asserting that she hadn’t intended to deceive anyone.

Boogie asserted she was doing well post-surgery, revealing that her transition cost her approximately N5 million.

== Personal life ==
In a 2023 interview addressing her gender identity, Boogie shared that she had recognized her feminine identity from a young age. She recalled instances from her childhood, including one day when she wore a bra to school in Primary 4. Regarding her breasts, she attributed their growth to hormones which she had been on for 3 years.

In an interview with BBC Pidgin, Boogie openly affirmed to being proud and fulfilled living in her true and authentic self as a transgender woman in Nigeria. When asked if she is still identified as a male by the mainstream media and society, Boogie responded with a rhetorical question pointing out her feminine physiques. Boogie also stated that the strong hate towards transgender people in Nigeria results in a lot of Nigerians choosing to welcome hardened criminals rather than transgender individuals. She also corrected the misconception people have about her as a gay man pointing out that she is a transgender woman who enjoys the intimacy of only men.

== See also ==
- Abuja Area Mama – Nigerian cross dresser (1991–2024)
- Bobrisky – Nigerian transgender woman (born 1991)
- Fola Francis – Nigerian transgender model (1994–2023)
- Miss Sahhara – Nigerian beauty queen and LGBTQ advocate
- Noni Salma – Nigerian transgender woman
- James Brown (internet personality) – Nigerian social media personality
- Veso Golden Oke – Nigerian transgender model
