= John Nevay (poet) =

Scottish poet

- Born: 28 January 1792; Forfar, Scotland
- Died: 4 May 1870 (aged 78); Forfar, Scotland
- Occupation: Poet

John Nevay (28 January 1792 – 4 May 1870) was a Scottish poet.

== Biography ==
Nevay was born in the town of Forfar, Scotland on 28 January 1792. He was well educated in the Forfar schools, one of his teachers being James Clarke, a friend of Robert Burns. As a boy Nevay showed a lively appreciation of natural beauty, and the slopes and valleys of the neighbouring Grampians were early familiar to him. He soon essayed descriptive and sentimental verse, and literature became an unfailing recreation in his long and arduous career in Forfar as a handloom weaver. He was a close friend of Alexander Laing, the Brechin poet, and he contributed to his Angus Album in 1833 an interesting poem in Spenserian stanza, Mary of Avonbourne. Widely recognised by literary men, Nevay corresponded with Ebenezer Elliot, and found an appreciative critic in Professor Wilson, who inserted his touching lyric, The Yeldron, in one of the Noctes Ambrosianæ (in Blackwood's Magazine, 1835). He is said to have written prose tales in various periodicals, and to have contributed to the Edinburgh Literary Journal. From an unpublished autobiographical sketch it would appear that the Chevalier de Chatelain translated several of Nevay's lyrics into French, and that German translations also were made (Grant Wilson, Poets and Poetry of Scotland). Nevay died in Forfar on 4 May 1870.

As a lyric poet Nevay, without being very ambitious, is spontaneous and tender. His published works are:

- A Pamphlet of Rhymes, 1818.
- A second Pamphlet, 1821.
- Emmanuel, a sacred poem in nine cantos, 1831.
- The Peasant, 1834.
- The Child of Nature, and other poems, 1835.
- Rosaline's Dream, with Introduction by the Rev. George Gilfillan, 1853.
- The Fountain of the Rock, 1855.
