= Chatelaine =

Chatelaine may refer to:

- Chatelaine (chain), a set of short chains on a belt worn by women and men for carrying keys, thimble and/or sewing kit, etc.
- Chatelaine (horse), a racehorse
- Chatelaine (magazine), an English-language Canadian women's magazine
  - Châtelaine, a French-Canadian counterpart to that magazine
- Châtelaine, Switzerland, a village in the municipality of Vernier, near Geneva

== See also ==
- Châtelain (feminine châtelaine), the keeper of a castle
- Chatelain (disambiguation)
- Chastel (disambiguation)
- Chatel (disambiguation)
- Chateau (disambiguation)
