= Chatelain (surname) =

Chatelain or Châtelain is a French surname. Notable people with the surname include:

- Christine Chatelain, Canadian film and television actress
- Clara de Chatelain (1807–1876), English writer and composer
- Danièle Chatelain, professor of French and writer
- Hélène Châtelain, (1935–2020), French actress
- Hubert Paul Chatelain (1917–?)
- Jean Baptiste Claude Chatelain (1710–?), French engraver
- Jeremy Chatelain (disambiguation), multiple people
