= Chantel =

Chantel is a French given name. It is a variant of Chantal.

== People ==
- Azaria Chantel Chamberlain (1980–1980), Australian 2-month old baby girl who was killed by a dingo near Uluru
- Chantel Dubay, model
- Chantel Emonson (born 1993), Australian rules footballer
- Chantel Jeffries (born 1992), American DJ and model
- Chantel Jones (born 1988), American former professional soccer player in the National Women's Soccer League
- Chantel Malone (born 1991), athlete in the long jump and sprinting events, representing the British Virgin Islands
- Chantel McGregor (born 1986), British blues rock guitarist and singer-songwriter from Bradford, England
- Chantel Poirer (born 1985), Canadian former pair skater
- Chantel Riley, Canadian-Jamaican actor
- Chantel Tremitiere (born 1969), American former professional women's basketball player
- Chantel Wolfenden (born 1986), OAM, Australian Paralympic swimmer
- Chantel Woodhead (born 1974), former English international football player

== Characters ==
- Chantel, a That's So Raven character and of The Cheetah Girls trilogy
- Chantel Sauvé, a Degrassi character
- Lourdes Chantel, a Marvel Comics character
- Chantel Frausier, supporting character of the cancelled series Cloak & Dagger
- Chantel DuBois, main antagonist of Madagascar 3: Europe's Most Wanted

== See also ==
- Cantel (disambiguation)
- Chantelle (disambiguation)
- Chatel (disambiguation)
