= Château (disambiguation) =

A château is a manor house or a country house of gentry, usually French, with or without fortifications.

Château, The Chateau, or variants may also refer to:

== Places ==
- Château, Saône-et-Loire, a commune in France
- Chateau Tongariro or The Chateau, a New Zealand hotel and resort complex

=== United States ===
- Chateau (Pittsburgh), a neighborhood in the city of Pittsburgh, PA
- The Chateau (Denver, Colorado), a building on the National Register of Historic Places in Denver, Colorado
- Chateau Theatre or The Chateau, a building in Rochester, Minnesota, listed on the NRHP
- Oregon Caves Chateau or The Chateau, a historic hotel in Oregon Caves National Monument

== Music ==
- Chateaux (band), a new wave of British heavy metal (NWOBHM) band
- "Chateau" (Angus & Julia Stone song), a 2017 song
- "Chateau" (Tokio Hotel song), a 2019 song by Tokio Hotel
- "Chateau", a 2003 Rob Dougan song featured on The Matrix Reloaded: The Album
- "Chateau", a 2017 Blackbear song from the album Digital Druglord
- "Chateau", a 2019 song by Jaden Smith on the album Erys
- "Chateau", a 2025 song by Audrey Hobert on the album Who's the Clown?

== Other uses ==
- Le Château, a clothing retailer
- Château fort or Castle, a type of fortified structure built during the Middle Ages
- Château style, a Revivalist architectural style
- Château, a chocolate brand produced by August Storck KG for Aldi

== See also ==
- Chatelaine (disambiguation)
- Chatelain (disambiguation)
- Chastel (disambiguation)
- Chatel (disambiguation)
