= Class traitor =

Person who works directly or indirectly against their class interest

A class traitor is someone who works directly or indirectly against their class interest, or against their economic benefit and in favor of another class. According to Barbara Ehrenreich: "Class treason is an option at all socioeconomic levels: from the blue-collar man who becomes a security guard employed to harass striking workers, to the heirs of capitalist fortunes who become donors to left-wing causes".

In socialist discourse, examples of a member of the proletarian class who works in favor of the bourgeoisie include soldiers, police officers, corrections officers, collection bureau agents, bounty hunters, loss prevention, repossession agents, security guards (mainly those hired by private security companies), workers who cross and refuse to respect picket lines during a strike and anyone paid a wage who actively facilitates the status quo. The motives behind becoming a traitor to one's class can include the necessity of survival (taking up whatever wage is available), the belief that the person is of a higher class and so has political views that work against the working class, the pressure of conformity, or a rejection of the view that society is divided up into antagonistic classes.

While the idea of the class traitor is one typically applied to the proletariat, it can also be used to describe members of the upper-class who believe in and espouse socialist ideals. For example, Peter Kropotkin, an anarcho-communist who wrote The Conquest of Bread, was born into a noble family. Additionally, Friedrich Engels, partner and lifelong friend of Karl Marx, the revolutionary socialist, was himself a son of a wealthy factory owner. Such people sacrifice their ability to be part of the capitalist upper-class for the sake of who they see as the oppressed, even if it hurts their status in the process. The Earl of Cardigan successfully sued The Daily Telegraph for defamation after its editor Bill Deedes called him a class traitor for being a witness for New Age travellers suing the police for using excessive violence during a 1985 confrontation known as the Battle of the Beanfield. During his 2026 campaign for governor of California, American billionaire Tom Steyer referred to himself as a class traitor via hat.

In Russia before and during the Russian Revolution, the Bolsheviks and other socialist revolutionary organizations used it to describe the Czarist Army and any working class citizen who sabotaged the will of the worker councils. The Bolsheviks later extended the definition to include the Menshevik Russians and other counter-revolutionary socialist organizations under Joseph Stalin.

== See also ==
- Class struggle
- False consciousness
- Internalized oppression
- Marxist theory of alienation
- Lumpenproletariat
- Race traitor
- Sycophancy
- Transclass
- Uncle Tom
