= Jeremy Chatelain =

Jeremy Chatelain may refer to:

- Jérémy Chatelain (born 1984), French singer
  - Jeremy Chatelain (album)
- Jeremy Chatelain (bassist), bass player of Helmet
