= Esther Onyekesi =

Commissioner for Women Affairs and Social Development
- Appointed by: Governor Charles Soludo
- Preceded by: Mrs. Ify Obinabo

Personal details
- Party: All Progressive Grand Alliance (APGA)
- Nickname: Adaejiejemba
- As of 6th May, 2026

Esther Onyekesi is a Nigerian politician. She is a grassroot woman political mobilization activist and the Woman Leader of All Progressives Grand Alliance (APGA) in Anambra State Nigeria.

== Career ==
Madam Esther was appointed as the Commissioner for Women Affairs and Social Development by Governor Charles Soludo of Anambra State, in May 2026. Her name was included in the list of nineteen (19) nominees as Commissioners and submitted to the Anambra State House of Assembly for screening and approval. Hence, her appointment took over from the former Commissioner for Women Affairs and Social Welfare, Anambra State, Mrs. Ify Obinabo.

According to the Anambra State government terms of reference on the State Ministry of Women Affairs and Social Development, the body is “responsible for the formulation and implementation of policies and programs aimed at promoting the welfare, empowerment, and protection of women and children in Anambra State. The ministry addresses issues related to gender equality, child rights, social welfare, and the overall development of women and vulnerable groups. It plays a crucial role in advocating for the rights of women and children, providing support services to those in need, and coordinating efforts to address social issues that affect the well-being of the state's population. The ministry works with various stakeholders, including government agencies, non-governmental organizations, and community groups, to achieve its objectives and create a more equitable and inclusive society.”

It should be remembered that Mrs. Esther Chinyere Onyekesi is the mother of late Martin Onyekesi, a business man known as ‘Fish Magnet, who was kidnapped and killed in 2025. Her son's death brought a lot of controversy and protest, which Martin Vincent Otse popularly known as Very Dark Man, championed. However, according to reports, Mrs Onyekesi "stood her ground, insisting, it had nothing to do with politics." During the condolence visits on her son's death, she narrated that, “they waited for him as he returned home. The moment he stepped out of his car to open the gate, they struck. I believe it was a planned attack.”
