= James Brown (internet personality) =

Nigerian social media personality

- Born: James Chukwueze Obialor; Lagos, Nigeria
- Occupation: Content creator
- Years active: 2018-present

James Chukwueze Obialor (born 22 February 1999), popularly known as James Brown, is a Nigerian internet personality and content creator who is part of the LGBTQ community in Nigeria.

== Work ==
In 2018, Brown was one of 57 young men arrested on charges of homosexuality at a birthday party in a hotel in Egbeda, a suburb of Lagos (homosexuality is illegal in Nigeria; see LGBTQ rights in Nigeria). The police displayed the arrested men in front of news media to humiliate them. While most stayed quiet, Brown spoke up to the media to describe his arrest as unfair, including saying that he was a dancer hired to perform at the party, and that the police had no evidence he had committed a crime. His speech, including his phrase "they didn't caught me", became part of viral videos about the incident. He and others were imprisoned for a month in the Ikoyi Correctional Facility. His bold public reaction to his arrest brought him significant media attention, along with support from Bobrisky, who is a Nigerian transgender woman and social media personality. The cases against him and the other arrested men were dismissed by a court in 2020.

The 2021 documentary The Legend of the Underground, about LGBTQ+ people in Nigeria, featured Brown among others. It follows the story of his legal case and his choice to turn media attention into visibility for himself on social media as a gender non-conforming person. Brown has said he identifies with and stands up for LGBT people. He has been noted and criticized as a visible Nigerian cross dresser. His father has also been criticized.

Brown has a significant audience on social media. His content includes videos of him dancing. He made a viral video with comedian Viral TV in 2019. Brown released a single titled "Hey Dulings" in 2021 after a catchphrase he uses to address his fans on social media. He wrote an autobiography in 2022, The Chronicles of an African Princess. In 2024, he acted in a Nollywood web series titled Hotel Palava.

Brown has described himself as a drag queen and comedian who plays a feminine role as entertainment, rather than a cross dresser. In 2022, the Nigerian House of Representatives introduced a bill to prohibit cross dressing, as an amendment to the Same Sex Marriage (Prohibition) Act 2013. Brown said the bill would not apply to him because of its exception for public entertainment.

== Personal life ==
Brown was born in Lagos to Mr. and Mrs. Peter Obialor. He said that he started cross-dressing when he was a child. He said he is a man with an "effeminate character". In 2022 he said he had a girlfriend.

In 2018, Brown said he had been infected with HIV at birth, but retracted this claim in 2020.

Brown said he went to the United Kingdom to study business at a university but left due to the cost.

Brown and Bobrisky have had public disagreements reported on by the media.

== See also ==
- Bobrisky – Nigerian transgender woman (born 1991)
- Fola Francis – Nigerian transgender model (1994–2023)
- Jay Boogie – Nigerian transgender woman (born 1998)
- Miss Sahhara – Nigerian beauty queen and LGBTQ advocate
- Noni Salma – Nigerian transgender woman
