= Fola Francis =

Nigerian transgender model (1994–2023)

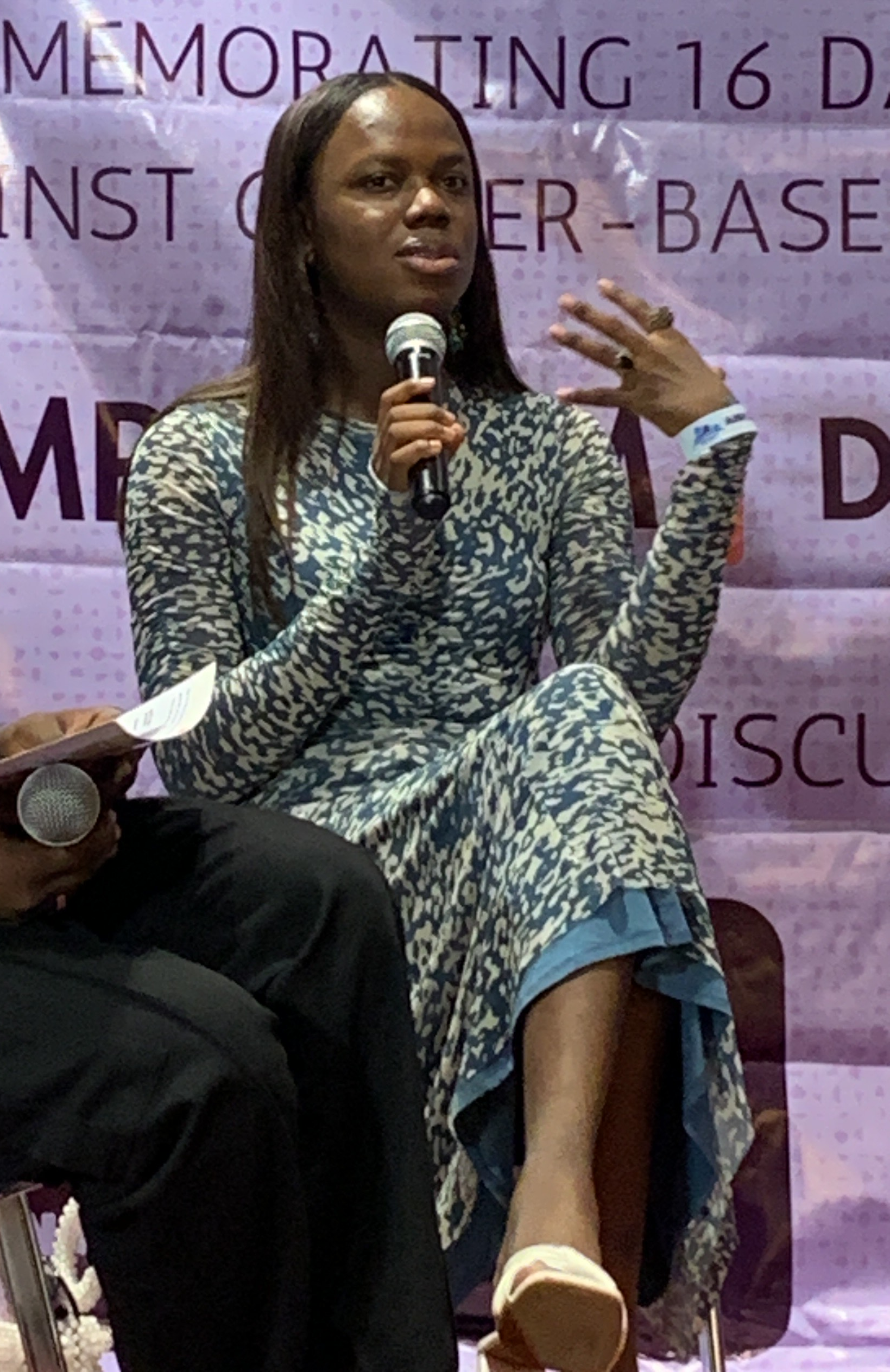
- Born: 18 March 1994; Nigeria
- Died: 20 December 2023 (aged 29)
- Occupations: Model; actress; activist; entrepreneur

Fola Francis (18 March 1994 – 20 December 2023) was a Nigerian transgender model, LGBTQIA+ activist and entrepreneur. In 2022, she became the first trans model to walk the Lagos Fashion Week runway for Cute-Saint and Fruché. Her debut on the runway had ripple effects, with the Lagos Fashion Week's team deciding not to post any of her pictures.

== Career and activism ==
Francis started her brand, Fola Francis, in 2018 as a way to deal with trauma from being kitoed. Before then, she worked as a blogger and TV producer in the Nigerian entertainment industry.

Francis constantly spoke out about trans and non-binary issues in Nigeria, and her voice was highlighted by the BBC after the cross-dressing bill was introduced in the country, which she called scary and dangerous. She actively participated in the Nigerian ballroom scene as host and queen of the Lagos ballroom scene and sought to replicate the feeling of safety, community, and positive representation balls are known for.

In 2023, Francis appeared in her first role as an actress in 14 Years And A Day an LGBTQ+ film by Uyaiedu Ikpe-Etim and Ayo Lawson. She also documented her journey as a trans woman on TikTok and was popularly known for her day in the life of a trans woman living in Nigeria videos.

Francis spoke on several LGBTQ+ panels, worked as an independent with several NGOs and queer organizations, and started Dolls Activities, a trans-focused initiative. In January 2024, a month after her death, trans author Akwaeke Emezi posted an unreleased music video for their single “IN THE MOOD,” starring Fola, as they paid tribute to her resilience.

== Death ==
On 20 December 2023, Fola Francis drowned on a visit to a beach in Lagos, Nigeria. In 2024, the yearly Ball organised by Ayo Lawson and Uyaiedu Ikpe-Etim was renamed the Fola Francis Ball in honour of her impact on the Nigerian queer scene.

== See also ==
- Area Scatter – first known cross dresser in Nigeria
- Abuja Area Mama – Nigerian cross dresser (1991–2024)
- Bobrisky – Nigerian transgender woman (born 1991)
- Jay Boogie – Nigerian transgender woman (born 1998)
- Miss Sahhara – Nigerian beauty queen and LGBTQ advocate
- Noni Salma – Nigerian transgender woman
- James Brown (internet personality) – Nigerian social media personality
