= Bobrisky =

Nigerian transgender woman (born 1991)

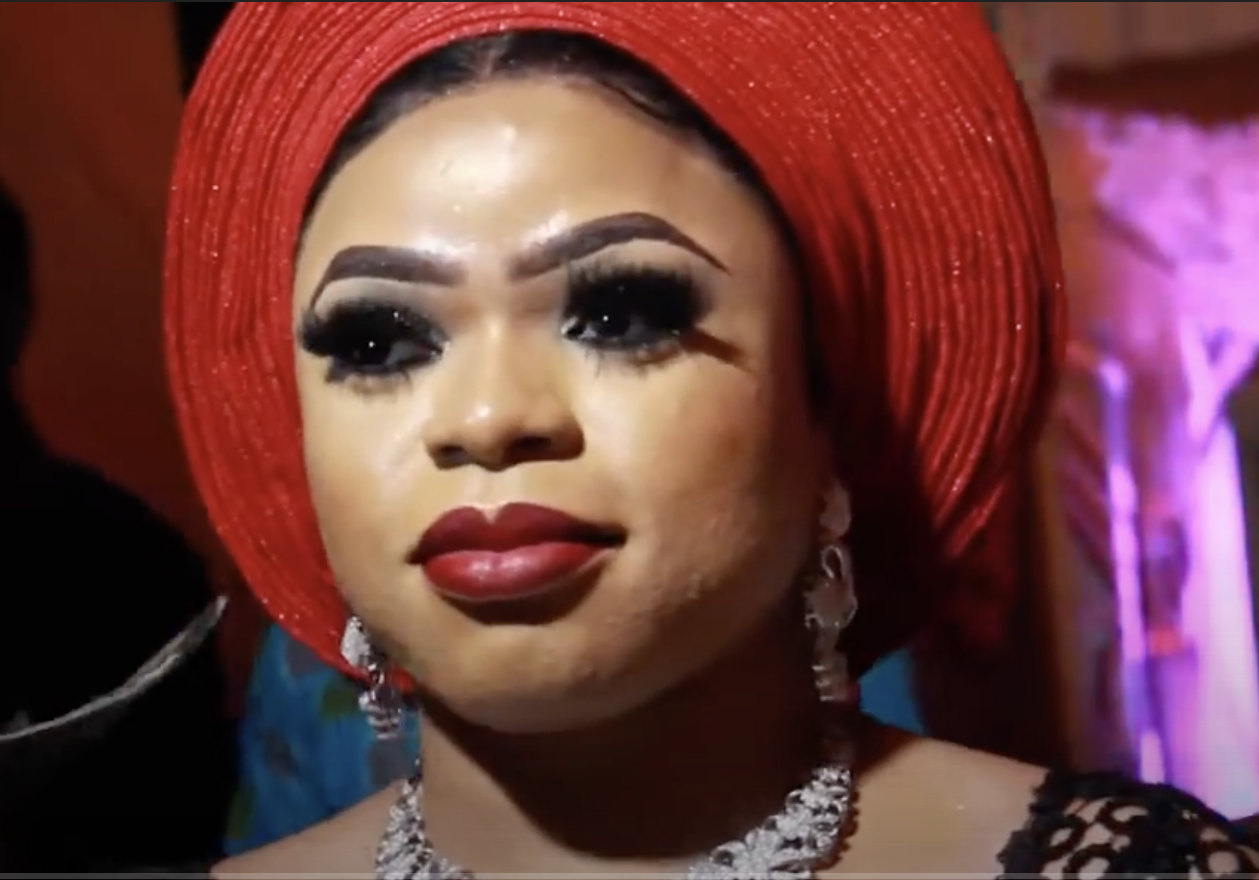
- Bobrisky on her birthday
- Born: Okuneye Idris Olanrewaju; 31 August 1991 (age 35); Abuja Nigeria
- Education: University of Lagos
- Occupation: Social media personality
- Years active: 2014–present

Okuneye Idris Olanrewaju (born 31 August 1991), predominantly known as Bobrisky, is a Nigerian social media personality. She is a transgender woman known for her presence on the social media apps Snapchat, TikTok, and Instagram.

Bobrisky has a huge following on social media. She is highly controversial on social media for not adhering to conservative Nigerian standards. She is a visible gender non-conforming person in a country where homosexuality is illegal (see LGBTQ rights in Nigeria). Bobrisky has always maintained that her pronouns are she/her, despite the heated debates surrounding them.

== Early life and education ==
Born Okuneye Idris Olarenwaju in 1991, Bobrisky attended both King's High School and Okota High School for her secondary school education, and graduated with a BSc degree in accounting from the University of Lagos (UNILAG). Bobrisky was briefly arrested in 2011 for posing as a woman, described as a way to make money for university fees, and sold clothes during university studies.

== Career and publicity ==
By 2016, Bobrisky had grown a large audience on Snapchat, where she published makeup videos and sold skin whitening creams. Progressive commentators have criticized her for promoting skin lightening and misogyny. She was interviewed in the 2019 documentary Skin about colorism among Nigerian women.

On Snapchat, Bobrisky also drew attention in 2016 and 2017 by referring to a lover who people assumed to be a man, despite the law in Nigeria that criminalizes same-sex relationships. Around that time, Bobrisky asserted to be a heterosexual man who put on a feminine appearance to get more customers for products. Bobrisky spoke against same-sex marriage and in support of the law against homosexuality, statements that drew concern from other LGBTQ people in Nigeria.

In October 2016, Bobrisky was an invited speaker at a conference in Abuja about uses of social media. Nigerian presidential aide Bashir Ahmad publicly withdrew from the event due to Bobrisky's participation. In November 2016, Taiwo Kola-Ogunlade, Google's Communications and Public Affairs Manager for West Africa, stated that Bobrisky was the most searched individual in Nigeria from 26 October to November of that year.

In 2019, Otunba Olusegun Runsewe, Director General of Nigeria's National Council for Arts and Culture, called Bobrisky "a national disgrace" and said she would be "dealt with ruthlessly" if caught on the streets, due to what he called an immoral lifestyle. He continued to criticize her in 2021.

She went viral on TikTok for creating the "Bobrisky" dance in 2021. Bobrisky has also drawn attention through her associations with other Nigerian celebrities, including Tonto Dikeh.

In July 2021, she revealed a new physical appearance after undergoing feminisation surgery. In 2025, she said she was now "a woman who has undergone everything."

In 2022, the Nigerian House of Representatives introduced a bill to prohibit cross-dressing as an amendment to the Same Sex Marriage (Prohibition) Act 2013, which was noted as potentially impacting Bobrisky if it passed. Bobrisky said it would not impact her because she was not a cross-dresser, since she had undergone surgeries to become a woman.

In April 2024, VeryDarkMan petitioned the police to investigate her over alleged public display of homosexuality. In November 2024, Bobrisky stated in an Instagram post that she left Nigeria for the sake of her sanity and health. She has confirmed her move to the UK, where she says she has found peace and freedom. In 2025, Bobrisky continues to assert that she is a "complete woman", having undergone several surgeries as part of her gender transition.

== Legal issues ==
=== Naira mutilation and related bribery allegations ===
In early April 2024, Bobrisky was arrested for allegedly defacing naira banknotes, following an investigation by the Economic and Financial Crimes Commission (EFCC). The charges stemmed from social media videos that appeared to show her throwing money in the air, including at a film premiere the previous month. Money spraying is common at parties, and the law against it is selectively enforced and rarely results in more than a fine. Bobrisky entered a guilty plea to four counts of currency abuse on 5 April 2024. The maximum penalty for this offence is six months in prison. On 12 April 2024, Bobrisky was sentenced to the maximum of six months in prison with no option of fine over "abusing and mutilating" Naira notes. Bobrisky was released from prison on 5 August 2024.

In September 2024, VeryDarkMan published an audio recording that he said showed evidence that Bobrisky had bribed officials to drop money laundering charges and let her serve her prison term in a private apartment. Two prison officials were suspended during investigation of the allegations. She denied the claims, and an investigative panel dismissed the allegations in October 2024. The panel also found that putting Bobrisky in a maximum security prison had been a violation of the Nigerian Correctional Service Act, because she was only a first-time offender.

On 20 October 2024, the Nigeria Immigration Service arrested Bobrisky while she was trying to leave the country through the Seme border, due to being "a person of interest over recent issues of public concern." She spent the night in custody, and on 21 October 2024 she was transferred to the Force Criminal Investigation Department Annex in Alagbon, Lagos. The EFCC arrested her again when she tried to take a flight to London at the end of October, saying that they needed her to substantiate her recent accusations against them.

In mid-November 2024, Bobrisky sued the EFCC for violation of fundamental rights, including for failing to verify the authenticity of VeryDarkMan's audio recording before calling for public hearings about it that caused harm to her health and reputation. Bobrisky's lawsuit was dismissed by a Federal High Court in Lagos on 28 November 2024. Justice Alexander Owoeye ruled that Bobrisky's "claims of violation of fundamental rights" lacked merit and could not be supported by "credible evidence". Bobrisky’s saga also exposed flaws in the Nigerian justice system and how minorities often bear the brunt of it, since the EFCC had no substantial evidence to charge her in a court of law, leading to the case being dropped.

In June 2025, Bobrisky criticised Nigerian senators for insufficient responses to the killings in Benue State, contrasting their lack of action with their previous investigations of her activities.

== See also ==
- Abuja Area Mama – Nigerian cross dresser (1991–2024)
- Fola Francis – Nigerian transgender model (1994–2023)
- Jay Boogie – Nigerian transgender woman (born 1998)
- Miss Sahhara – Nigerian beauty queen and LGBTQ advocate
- Noni Salma – Nigerian transgender woman
- James Brown (internet personality) – Nigerian social media personality
