= Aliyu Aziz =

Nigerian engineer

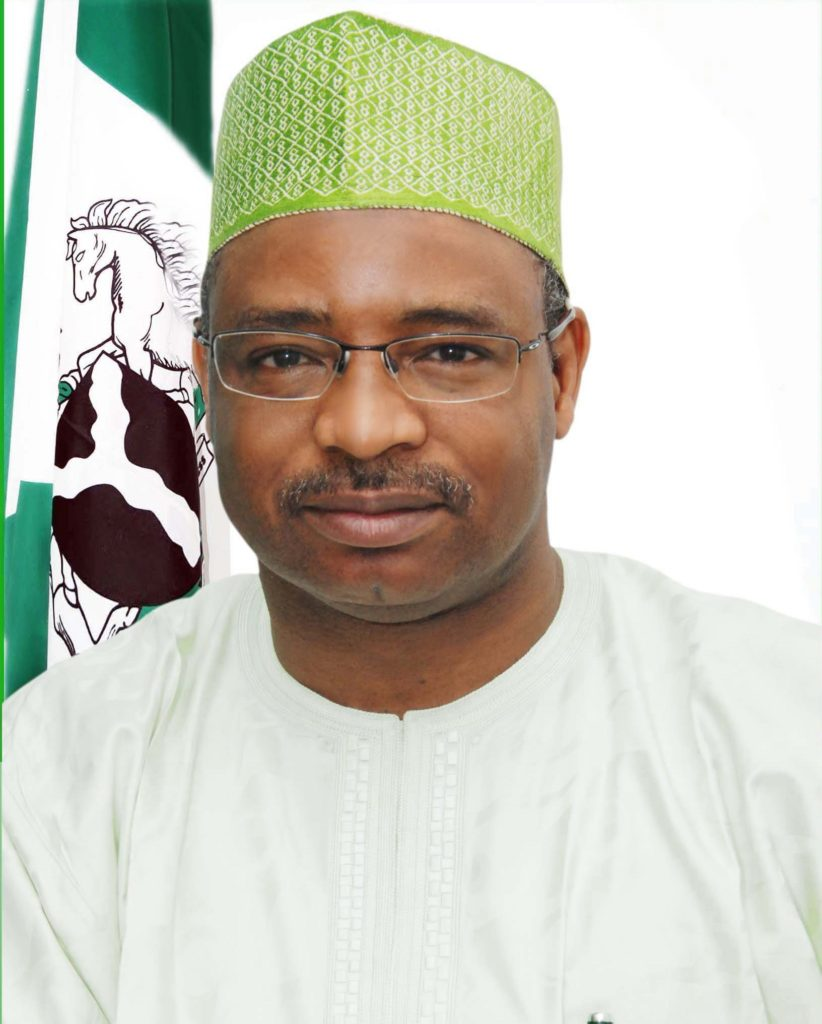

Director General/CEO, National Identity Management Commission
- Incumbent
- Assumed office November 24, 2015
- Preceded by: Chris Onyemenam

Personal details
- Born: May 17, 1962 (age 64) Gembu, Mambilla Plateau area of Taraba State, Nigeria
- Spouse: Married with Children
- Education: Ahmadu Bello University
- Profession: Structural Engineer and Information Technology Expert
- Website: aliyuaziz.com

Aliyu Abubakar Aziz is a chartered engineer with over 30 years post-qualification experience in information technology, management, and administration. He is the former Director General and Chief Executive Officer of Nigeria's National Identity Management Commission (NIMC). He had previously worked with some of the most progressive Government Institutions in Nigeria during their transformative years.

Aziz is a graduate of Ahmadu Bello University, Zaria where he received a B.Eng in Civil Engineering and an M.Sc. in Structural Engineering with specialty in Computer-aided design. He started his working career as a Graduate Assistant in the Civil Engineering Department of the university. He went on to become a Principal Partner of Integrated Engineering Associates (IEA), where he designed and supervised several prominent buildings and bridges in Kaduna and Abuja environs, including NUC Secretariat, PHCN Headquarters, AP Plaza, NACB Office block, and Nigeria Ports Authority Headquarters and many others.

== Early life and education ==
Aziz was born in Gembu, Mambilla Plateau area of Taraba State, Nigeria. He received early education at Ganye 1 Primary School and Government Secondary School Ganye, Adamawa State. He enrolled into the School of Basic Studies Zaria where he obtained ‘A’ level qualification before moving to Ahmadu Bello University Zaria, Kaduna state to study Civil Engineering. He graduated with a B.Eng. in Civil Engineering with Second Class Upper Division in 1983. In 1985 he earned NCC Certificate of System Analysis and Design and later pursured an M.Sc. in Structural Engineering, at Ahmadu Bello University, Zaria where he graduated in 1987. Aziz is currently pursuing a PhD in Reliability of Offshore Structures at the Federal University of Technology, Akure, Ondo State, Nigeria.

Aziz is an alumnus of Harvard and Stanford universities, IMD, and Lagos Business School, where he obtained several specialized trainings and certifications in several fields, at International Business Schools and Engineering Firms in Sweden, Switzerland, South Africa, UK, USA, Australia, Nigeria, etc.

== Engineering and Information Technology Career ==
Aziz started his engineering career in the Public Institution as a graduate assistant in the civil engineering department of Ahmadu Bello University, Zaria. In 1987, Aziz left ABU Zaria to join a private firm, Mai and Associates as a Pupil Engineer and rose to the rank of Project Engineer.

After leaving Mai and Associates, Aziz joined a group of friends in 1992 to found an engineering firm, Integrated Engineering Associates, and became a principal partner responsible for computer applications for structural engineering design and drafting. Aziz was credited for designing customized computer programmes such as spreadsheets, database, AutoCAD, AutoLISP and management information systems for the exclusive use of the firm. Aziz is a computer programmer and writes in several programming languages including BASIC, FORTRAN, APL, C++, Lisp, Java, Python and R.

Aziz then became a principal consultant on a joint venture partnership with Afri-Projects Consortium, consulting for the Petroleum Trust Fund, an agency of the Government of Nigeria and was the head of the Management Information Systems Department. There, he oversaw all computer and database-related activities in the organization. In 2000, Petroleum Trust Fund was dissolved and Afri-Projects Consortium's consultancy contract was terminated. Aziz left the firm and founded Integrated Systems Solution Limited, which focused on rendering information technology solutions. He was a consulting engineer on high-profile projects including:

In 2002, Aziz joined the Bureau of Public Enterprises as deputy director in charge of information technology with the task of formulating the agency's information technology strategy, frameworks and implementation for a successful overhaul of government's privatization policy. Aziz provided vision and leadership for developing and implementing information technology initiatives. He combined IT leadership with oversight on the management of all IT planning and implementation by ensuring the preparation of operational and strategic objectives and budgets. He also coordinated, directed and developed IT frameworks, policies and procedures for the bureau and assisted in the organizational restructuring activities of priority sectors/departments of Government.

In 2006, Aziz was appointed as Information Technology Adviser to the Minister of Nigeria's Federal Capital Territory, Nasir Elrufai. He initiated the e-government system in the FCT ministry, which won a Microsoft award in 2006. Aziz was also a director in the office of the Secretary to the Government of the Federation where he served in the Presidential Implementation Committee, charged with implementing Government Decisions on Consumer Credit System, National Outsourcing Initiative and Harmonization of Identification Schemes in Nigeria. The committee oversaw the setting up of the National Identity Management Commission in 2007. Aziz later became a pioneer staff of the commission and rose to the rank of Directorof Information Technology/Identity Database, a position he held until his retirement in 2014.

== National Identity Management Commission ==
In November 2015, Aziz was appointed director general and chief executive officer of Nigeria's National Identity Management Commission by President Muhammadu Buhari for a four-year term. In 2019, he was re-appointed for a second term.

In April 2019, Aziz obtained, the highest global standards of Information Security Management System for the commission, in its determination to ensure the security of citizen's data. In March 2019 Aziz announced that the commission was opening enrollment centers in foreign countries to enroll Nigerians in Diaspora into the National Identity Database (NIDB).
