= Wuse =

Metropolitan district in Abuja, Nigeria

Wuse is a metropolitan district located in the city of Abuja. Its geographical coordinates is 9° 4' 14" N 7° 28' 3" E. It hosts major federal government offices and private businesses. It is intertwined with Maitama to the northeast, the Central Business District to the southeast, Utako to the northwest and Wuye to the southwest. The district is an upscale commercial hub playing host to hotels, shopping malls, cinemas, parks, and other social infrastructure, securing its place as a hub of nightlife in Nigeria's capital. The district is one of the busiest in Abuja according to Google Map.

== Wuse District structure ==
Wuse is divided into Zones starting from Wuse Zone 1 to Wuse Zone 8. Each of the Zones is well planned with its own streets leading into other zones with the Wuse District for ease of movement and navigation. Each zone has both residential and business buildings.

== Social amenities ==
Wuse district hosts several social amenities including over fifty hotels ranging from 3 stars to 7 stars hotels. Its market known as Wuse Market is the biggest open market in the metropolitan city of Abuja. Wide range of products including textiles, crafts, jewelleries, housewares, fashion, electronics and fresh food items are traded in the market. Located between Sani Abacha Way and Herbert Macaulay Way in Wuse Zone II, it provides a glimpse of the local life. The market opens daily from 8:00 am – 6:00 pm local time and it is generally rowdy weekends. Wuse Zone 3 hosts the Zone 3 shopping complex where ICT equipment both hardware and software are sold. Wuse General Hospital is located just about three hundred meters almost adjacent the Zone 3 shopping complex. Nigeria biggest bureau de change trading hub is located in Zone 4. The Abuja Continental Hotel formerly Sheraton Hotel is just few meters away from the bureau the change market. The popular GSM Village is also in Wuse district. The district holds several recreation gardens across its 8 Zone. Bannex Plaza, a popular shopping mall for electronic gadgets is located in Wuse 2.

== Notable offices ==
- High Court of the Federal Capital, Zone 2, Wuse 1
- Nigeria Customs Service headquarters, Zone 3, Wuse 1
- Federal Road Safety Corps (FRSC) headquarters, Zone 3, Wuse 1
- Peoples Democratic Party National Headquarters, Zone 5, Wuse 1
- All Progressives Congress National Headquarters
- Buhari House, Blantyre Street, Wuse 2
- Federal Inland Revenue Service headquarters, Zone 5, Wuse 1
- National Identity Management Commission (NIMC) headquarters, Zone 5, Wuse 1

== Notable Hotels ==
- Abuja Continental Hotel (Formerly Sheraton Hotel), 1 Ladi Kwali Street, Zone 4, Wuse 1
- The Destination by Gidanka, N'Djamena Crescent, Off Aminu Kano Crescent, Wuse 2
- Johnwood Hotel by Bolton, 6 Sokode Crescent WUSE

== Schools ==
National Open University of Nigeria Study Centre, Zone 2, Wuse 1
