= Noni Salma =

Nigerian transgender woman

- Education: Universit
- Alma mater: University of Lagos
- Occupations: film maker, screen writer

Noni Salma is a Nigerian transgender film-maker and screenwriter whose growing up experiences in Lagos, Nigeria has inspired her storytelling. Her works are largely Women and Queer led dramas and comedies. She centers them in her writing in ways that are fresh, inspiring and kicking. Her slice-of-life feature drama screenplay, Raison D'etre is a ScreenCraft Screenwriting Fellowship 2021 Finalist and her comedy pilot, Badass is a ScreenCraft Comedy Competition 2021 semifinalist and on the GLAAD list 2022.

She's also a Stowe Story Labs Fellowships finalist. Noni Salma currently lives in New York.

== Early life ==
Salma earned a bachelor's degree in arts from the University of Lagos, where she majored in theater arts. She went on to study filmmaking at the New York Film Academy in New York, where she majored in directing and received a diploma.

In 2019, Salma said she wished she had transitioned at 19 and hadn’t spent most of her earlier years pretending to be someone she wasn’t.

== Career ==
Her directed short thriller Alibi won Best Crime Mystery at the Manhattan Film Festival in 2016. Salma received the Treasure Coast International Film Festival's '1st Place Student Film Competition' Award for her NYFA PhD thesis; 'Morning after Midnight'. She produced and directed the riveting short documentary 'Veil Of Silence' also known as 'Curtain of Silence', which premiered in March 2014 at the BFI Flare London LGBT Film Festival in London, United Kingdom; Veil Of Silence has also screened at the United Nations, Egale Canada, and the German Foreign Office, among other places. Following that, Veil Of Silence screened at a number of film festivals, including the Queer Screen Film Festival, CineHomo Film Festival, Valladoid, Spain in April 2015, where it won second place for Best Short Documentary, as praised by the audience. Noni Salma made the nomination list for 'The Future Awards Africa Prize for Screen Producer' in 2018 among.

== Works ==
Veil of Silence - 2014

Hell or High Water - 2016

We Don't Live Here Anymore - 2018

== See also ==
- Bobrisky – Nigerian transgender woman (born 1991)
- Fola Francis – Nigerian transgender model (1994–2023)
- Jay Boogie – Nigerian transgender woman (born 1998)
- Miss Sahhara – Nigerian beauty queen and LGBTQ advocate
- James Brown (internet personality) – Nigerian social media personality
