= Super Sireyna Worldwide 2014 =

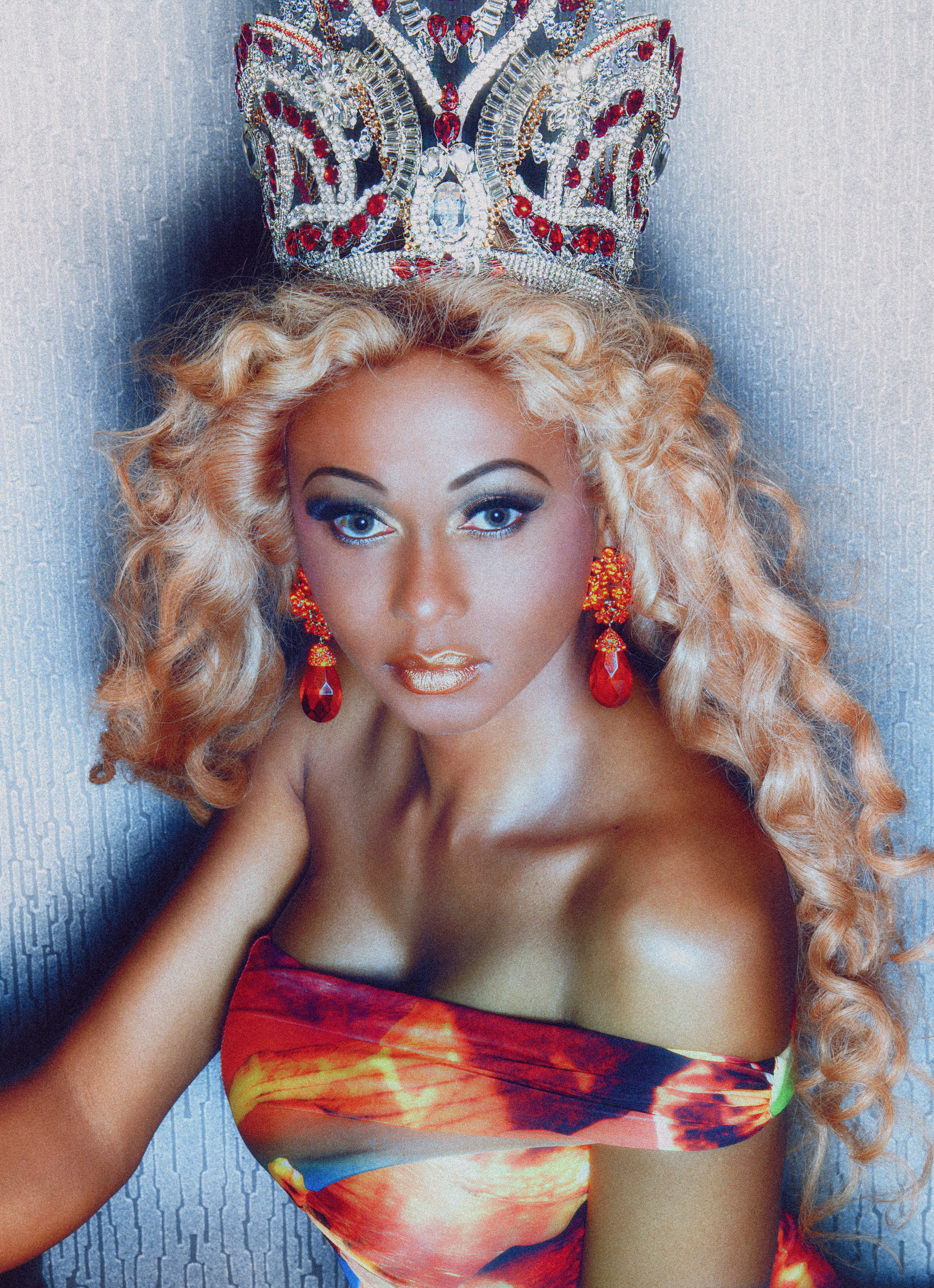
- Miss Sahhara, Super Sireyna Worldwide 2014
- Date: July 19, 2014
- Venue: Broadway Centrum, Manila, Philippines
- Broadcaster: GMA Network
- Entrants: 8
- Placements: 3
- Winner: Miss Sahhara; Nigeria
- Super Costume: Isabella Santiago; Venezuela

Super Sireyna Worldwide 2014 was the first Super Sireyna Worldwide pageant, held on 19 July 2014. The event was held at Broadway Centrum, Manila, Philippines. Miss Sahhara of Nigeria was crowned as the pageant's first winner at the end of the event.

== Results ==
=== Placements ===
Final results	Contestant
Super Sireyna Worldwide 2018	Nigeria – Miss Sahhara
1st Runner-Up	Philippines – Trixie Maristela
2nd Runner-Up	Venezuela – Isabella Santiago

=== Special awards ===
Special awards	Contestant
Best Talent	Nigeria – Miss Sahhara
Best National Costume	Venezuela – Isabella Santiago
Best in Long gown	Thailand – Lily Leiwilaicharlerm

== Contestants ==
Contestants competed for the title:

Country	Contestant	Hometown
Ecuador	Susi Villa	Quito
Germany	Jessica Spirit	Berlin
India	Laeticia Patel	New Delhi
Japan	Annabel Yu	Tokyo
Nigeria	Miss Sahhara	London
Philippines	Trixie Maristela	Manila
Thailand	Lily Leiwilaicharlerm	Bangkok
Venezuela	Isabella Santiago	Caracas
