= Money spraying =

Cultural practice in Nigeria of throwing cash at social events

An artwork depicting a man, left, dressed in a white agbada money spraying at a troupe of performing musicians in front of an audience.

Money spraying is a cultural practice in Nigeria where guests at social events, such as weddings, birthday parties, and other celebrations, throw naira banknotes at celebrants as a gesture of appreciation, support, and celebration. The practice, sometimes colloquially referred to as "making it rain", is practiced particularly among the Igbo and Yoruba people.It is also a symbol of patronage.

Despite its cultural significance, money spraying remains controversial due to legal restrictions under the Central Bank of Nigeria (CBN) Act of 2007, which classifies the practice as currency abuse.

== Origins ==
The tradition traces its roots to the 1940s, when Nigerian families saw the act as a form of giving financial assistance to newlywed couples.During Nigeria's oil boom in the 1960s and 1970s, the practice evolved into a more public display of throwing crisp, often freshly minted naira notes at dancing celebrants, symbolizing wealth, social status, and generosity.Academic studies describe money spraying at social ceremonies as a form of conspicuous redistribution that combines public displays of wealth with reciprocal social support.

== Legal framework and enforcement ==
=== Central Bank Act provisions ===
Under Section 21(1) of the Central Bank of Nigeria Act of 2007, spraying, dancing on, or otherwise tampering with naira notes constitutes "currency abuse", an offense punishable by imprisonment for at least six months, a fine of ₦50,000, or both penalties. The CBN maintains that money spraying defaces banknotes, increases currency management costs, and undermines national pride in the naira, particularly following the currency's 70% value decline between 2023 and 2025.

=== Enforcement actions ===
The Economic and Financial Crimes Commission (EFCC) has intensified enforcement efforts since 2024, targeting high-profile figures to demonstrate the seriousness of currency abuse laws. Idris Okuneye (popularly known as Bobrisky) was sentenced to six months imprisonment in 2024 for spraying naira notes at a film premiere. Oluwadarasimi Omoseyin, a Nollywood actress, received a conviction and prison sentence for the same offense in 2024. Cubana Chief Priest, a prominent socialite and nightclub owner, settled a naira abuse case through an out-of-court agreement in 2024.

By 2024, the EFCC reported over 200 pending trials and 24 successful convictions related to currency abuse, with presiding judges emphasizing zero tolerance for currency defacement.

== Criticism and controversy ==
=== Economic analysis ===
The government's crackdown on money spraying has faced significant criticism from various quarters. Economic analysts argue that the enforcement efforts have little material impact on addressing the naira's fundamental value challenges. Critics contend that the focus on money spraying distracts from more pressing economic issues affecting Nigeria's currency stability.

=== Selective enforcement allegations ===
Public affairs analyst Sani Bala and media entrepreneur Oluwamayowa Idowu have accused the EFCC of selective enforcement, allegedly targeting ordinary citizens while showing leniency toward politically connected individuals. They cite the case of former Niger Delta militant Government Ekpemupolo, who was merely "invited" for questioning after being filmed spraying money, rather than facing immediate prosecution.

=== Social and cultural perspectives ===
The cultural practice creates social pressure and financial strain for guests who feel obligated to participate, highlighting underlying socioeconomic disparities within Nigerian society. Critics argue that Nigeria's more significant challenges, particularly political corruption and governance issues, deserve greater attention and resources than currency spraying enforcement.

Islamic clerics have criticized the practice as extravagant and contrary to religious values, advocating instead for charitable giving and warning that sprayed cash could metaphorically "turn into snakes" in the afterlife according to Islamic teachings.

== Cultural adaptations and modern evolution ==
=== Persistence despite legal restrictions ===
Despite ongoing legal restrictions, money spraying continues to thrive as a cherished tradition that reflects Nigeria's vibrant cultural identity and resistance to regulatory interference in cultural practices. Enforcement efforts have led to more discreet practices, with some event organizers and guests avoiding filming or social media documentation to evade EFCC scrutiny.

=== Legal compliance alternatives ===
Nigerians have developed creative alternatives to maintain the cultural essence of money spraying while complying with legal requirements. These include the use of prop money (imitation currency that mimics the visual impact of traditional spraying without violating currency laws), decorative envelopes (guests place actual money in customized, ornate envelopes for discreet gifting that preserves the ceremonial aspect), and redeemable vouchers (event hosts provide specially designed vouchers with predetermined monetary values that can be exchanged after the celebration).

Celebrants like Cubana Chief Priest have adopted electronic money transfers to performers and musicians during events. Wealthy Nigerians increasingly spray foreign currencies not subject to CBN restrictions.

== See also ==
- Hell money - a Chinese practice of burning immitation money at funerals
