= Vincent Olatunji =

Nigerian researcher

Vincent Olatunji Dr.

Nigeria Data Protection Commission (NDPC)

National Commissioner
- Incumbent
- Assumed office 11 October 2023

Personal details
- Education: University of Lagos

Vincent Olatunji is a Nigerian policy innovator, public sector analyst, and the National Commissioner of the Nigeria Data Protection Commission (NDPC). He was previously the acting director general of the National Information Technology Development Agency (NITDA) and also served as chairman of Nigeria Data Protection Commission Implementation Committee.

== Early life and education ==
He was born in Ekiti state. He attended the University of Lagos in 1996 where he obtained a diploma in computer science. He holds a doctorate degree (PhD) in Geography and Planning from University of Lagos and an Advanced Diploma in Computer Science. He is a certified Public Private Partnership Specialist (IP3 Specialist) and Certified Data Protection Officer.

== Career ==
After his graduation from the university, he joined the Federal Civil Service in Nigeria as a research officer under the Federal Urban Mass Transit Agency. He joined National Information Technology Development Agency (NITDA) in 2002 in the planning research and statistics department. He became NITDA Director in 2014 and Acting Director General in 2016. He also worked as Director of eGovernment and Regulations at NITDA. He was appointed the national commissioner of the Nigeria Data Protection Agency (NDPC) in 2022 by President Muhammadu Buhari. In October 2023, he was re-appointed by President Bola Tinubu. He was appointed to the Forbes Technology Council in 2023.

== Work ==
He has developed strategies and framework for implementation to the Nigerian’s eGovernment and National ICT Transformation Agenda, which led to the development of various policies like; Nigeria Inter-Operability Framework, Nigeria Government Enterprise Architecture Framework, Cloud First Policy, Government Digital Service Policy, Nigeria Data Protection Regulation and Smart Initiatives Framework to enhance Nigeria Digital Transformation.

== Awards and recognition ==
1. GNC Digital Hall of Fame Award for his contribution to emerging technology for development initiatives in Africa 2023.
2. Top 50 Digital Economy Enablers in Nigeria by IT Edge News in February 2023.
3. 100 leading Telecom and ICT personalities in a Nigeria by the Association of Telecommunications Companies of Nigeria.
4. Outstanding Commitments Award by University of Lagos Alumni Association.
5. Eminent Personality Award by Ekiti State University.
6. Honorary Doctor of Public Administration by Ekiti State University in June 2018.
