= Chastel =

Chastel may refer to:

== Communes in France ==
- Chastel, Haute-Loire, in the Haute-Loire department
- Chastel-Arnaud, in the Drôme department
- Chastel-Nouvel, in the Lozère department
- Chastel-sur-Murat, in the Cantal department

== People ==
- André Chastel (1912–1990), French art historian
- Guigues du Chastel (1083–1136), legislator of the Carthusian Order and ascetical writer
- Jean Chastel (1708–1790), a farmer and innkeeper who killed the Beast of Gévaudan
- Louis Pierre Aimé Chastel (1774–1826), French general of the Napoleonic Wars
- Olivier Chastel (born 1964), Belgian politician
- Tanneguy du Chastel (1369–1449), French military leader of the Hundred Years' War

== See also ==
- Chatel (disambiguation)
- Chateau (disambiguation)
- Chatelain (disambiguation)
- Chatelaine (disambiguation)
