= Bisoye Coker Odusote =

Director General, National Identity Management Commission (NIMC), Nigeria

Bisoye Coker Odusote (born in 1984) is a Nigerian engineer and the Chief Executive Officer and Director General of the National Identity Management Commission (NIMC) of Nigeria, she was formerly the General Manager of the Lagos State Infrastructure Maintenance and Regulatory Agency (LASIMRA).

== Career ==
Coker-Odusote was the head of Information Technology and Communication at Bate Litwin, an engineering company working on projects such as Chevron ESA (JV with Atlas). She was the head of Information Technology and Communication at BATELitwin (formerly a subsidiary of Litwin, France), which is an engineering company working for the Oil and Gas Upstream, midstream, and Downstream sectors.

In 2021, she became the General Manager/Chief Executive Officer (GM/CEO) of the Lagos State Infrastructure Maintenance and Regulatory Agency (LASIMRA), which is charged with regulating utility infrastructure within the state.

She was appointed as the director general (DG) of the National Identity Management Commission (NIMC) by President Bola Tinubu.
