= Chantal Spitz =

French Polynesian writer (born 1954)

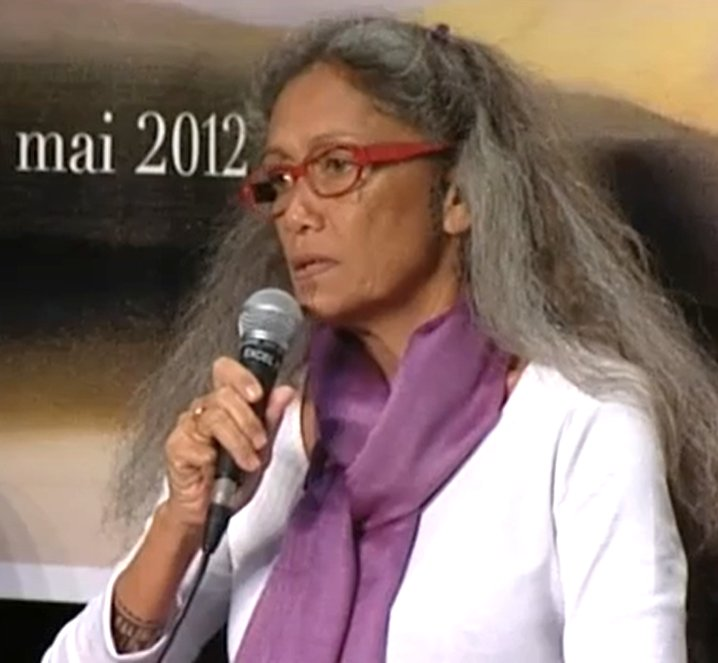
- Spitz in 2012
- Born: 18 November 1954 (age 71); Papeete, French Polynesia
- Occupation: Author
- Writing career
- Language: French
- Notable work: L'Ile des rêves écrasés

Chantal T. Spitz (born 11 November 1954) is a Mā’ohi author and activist.

== Biography ==
Spitz was born in Papeete, French Polynesia, in 1954. Although raised outside of French Polynesia, after completing her education she returned and now lives in Huahine.

Spitz's work focuses the experiences of indigenous people. She has produced poems, essays, and novels.

Her best-known work, L'Île des rêves écrasés, is the first ever novel by an indigenous French Polynesian writer. Set in French Polynesia in the time period leading up to the first nuclear tests in the region, it tells the story of several generations of Mā’ohi. Due to its criticisms of the French government, its publication in French Polynesia was polarising. In 2007 it was translated into English by Jean Anderson, as Island of Shattered Dreams, and published by Huia Publishers.

Spitz is a founding member of the literary magazine, Littérama’ohi, a French Polynesian publication that aims to showcase authors from French Polynesia.

== Selected works ==
- L'Île des rêves écrasés (1991)
- Hombo, transcription d'une biographie (2002)
- Pensées insolentes et inutiles (2006)
- Elles, terre d'enfance (2011)
- Cartes postales (2015)
