= Cantel =

Cantel or Cantell may refer to

- Cantel, Guatemala, a municipality in the Quetzaltenango department of Guatemala
- Cantel AT&T, a former Canadian mobile network operator now known as Rogers Wireless
- Cantel Medical Corporation, a company which produces and sells medical equipment
- Cantell School

== See also ==
- Cantellated tesseract
