= Transclass =

Person who changes the socioeconomic class from which they were born

Transclass, class transitioner, class defector (French: transfuge de classe), or social defector (transfuge social) refers to an individual who has experienced a major change in social environment during their lifetime. The concept of transclass was coined by the French philosopher Chantal Jaquet. In the English translation of her work, Gregory Elliot employs the term class-passing (passage (de classe)) instead of defection (transfuge). Similarly, the German translation by Horst Brühmann established the term "class passer" (German: Klassenübergänger) in this context.

== Definition ==
Becoming transclass follows a significant passing in social space, meaning for an individual to permeate the boundaries that differentiate social classes. This passing can occur following marriage, employment, studies, etc. Whether upward or downward, passing necessitates substantial social mobility. The existence of defectors is therefore partly linked to the possibility for individuals to radically change their social environment.

The upward change of social class encounters not only sociological difficulties (see in particular the theses of Pierre Bourdieu), but also psychological difficulties, which were discovered by Vincent de Gaulejac through the concept of class neurosis (La Névrose de classe, book published in 1987; re-edited in 1991).

The concept of transclass was put forward by the philosopher Chantal Jaquet, who herself experienced a transclass trajectory. Chantal Jaquet published her theory in the book titled "The Transclasses or the non-reproduction" in 2014 (Les Transclasses ou la non-reproduction) followed by a collective work "The Transclass Factory" (French: La fabrique des transclasses) published in 2018 and edited with philosopher Gérard Bras. The first book was translated into English by Gregory Elliot titled Transclasses – A Theory of Social Non-reproduction and published in 2023. According to Chantal Jaquet, her conceptual model supplements Bourdieu's work on exceptions to social reproduction (non-reproduction) within a class by using the "logic of the contrary" (rather than the logic of contradiction). The concept of transclass discusses possible causes of these exceptional life paths (social advancement) without resorting to the "ideology of the self-made man".

== Media and literary coverage ==
The concept was the subject of the French documentary "Infrared – The Transclass Challenge" (Infrarouge – Le défi des transclasses) broadcast in May 2020. It was also featured in the French weekly radio program "Obstacle Course" (Parcours de combattants), which aired during the France Inter summer schedule in 2021. In Philonomist, an independent online publication exploring business, work, and economic trends through philosophy and the human sciences, Chantal Jaquet and French sociologist Gérald Bronner discussed a potential miserabilist discourse on transclass identity published in March 2023. Jaquet cautioned against "any moralization of transclass people," advocating that "a free being needn’t be ashamed nor proud of their origins."

A famous example of a figure that would fall under the transclass label is French writer Annie Ernaux. Ernaux has been cited as a prominent example of a novelist who “confront[s] the question of class betrayal.” In her 2022 Nobel lecture, she declared she had already committed to writing about class transition sixty years ago: “I will write to avenge my people, j’écrirai pour venger ma race…I proudly and naively believed that writing books, becoming a writer, as the last in a line of landless labourers, factory workers and shopkeepers, people despised for their manners, their accent, their lack of education, would be enough to redress the social injustice linked to social class at birth.” Her reason to write and create is irrevocably tied to the cause of the transclass. She views her writing as political in that it reveals systems of social inequality, and she intends for her writing to provide representation for the working class. In works such as A Woman’s Story, Ernaux depicts class portrayal through parallel scenes with her father as the representation of a lower class.

== Reception ==
According to Laélia Véron and Karine Abiven, class passing has become a “'screen term' that artificially popularizes the idea of social mobility in a world where real opportunities for mobility are limited and where the reversal of hierarchies does not seem likely to happen anytime soon”, and a “mythical category” rather than a sociological one. In their book "Betray and avenge. Paradoxes in stories of class defection" (Trahir et venger. Paradoxes des récits de transfuge de classe, 2024), they explain that the defector or passing narrative, after enjoying great success, is currently experiencing a “backlash” and they question its future.

Sociologist Cédric Hugrée, a researcher at the CNRS specializing in social classes and the sociology of education, explains that there are several discrepancies between the most well-known stories of upward passing and the state of social mobility in France today: "The emphasis is on achieving significant social and geographical mobility, essentially through education bias, and therefore intended for cultural fractions of the upper classes. Finally, for many, these are stories about men. (...) However, upward mobility tends to be small-scale social mobility, which more often involves women. And while degrees play a major role in accessing skilled jobs, there are also other ways of accessing dominant positions (through money, sport, politics, the arts, etc.) that are less widely reported, or are not published in literary collections. From this point of view, we could say that the transclass (transfuge) narrative as a genre is far from having exhausted the reality of social mobility, whereas, according to you, it seems to have exhausted the novelistic."

== Bibliography ==
=== English ===
- Jaquet, Chantal, author; Elliott, Gregory, translator. Transclasses: A theory of Social Non-reproduction. London, New York; Verso Books, 2023. ISBN 978-1-83976-885-9

=== French ===
- Bourdieu, Pierre. Esquisse pour une auto-analyse ("Outline for a Self-Analysis"). Paris; Raisons d’agir, 2004. doi:10.7202/018181ar
- Desmitt, Claire. La figure du transfuge: illustration biographique d’un parcours de résistance et de recherche ("The Figure of the Defector: A Biographical Portrait of a Journey of Resistance and Inquiry") In: Le sujet dans la cité ("The subject in the city"), 2015/1 (Actuels n°4), p. 164-175. doi:10.3917/lsdlc.hs04.0164
- Dubois, Régis. Réflexions d'un transclasse qui n'a pas trahi ("Reflections of a transclass individual who has not betrayed (their roots"). Woodstock/TheBookEdition, 2026. ISBN 978-2-9542012-8-3
- Eribon, Didier. Retour à Reims ("Return to Reims"). Paris; Fayard, 2009. ISBN 978-2-213-63834-8
- Ernaux, Annie. Écrire la vie ("Writing Life"). Paris; Gallimard, 2011.
- Gaulejac, Vincent de. La névrose de classe: trajectoire sociale et conflits d'identité ("The Class Neurosis: Social Trajectories and Identity Conflicts"). Montréal; Hommes & Groupes Éd., 1987. ISBN 978-2-86984-014-0
- Gaulejac, Vincent de. La névrose de classe: trajectoire sociale et conflits d’identité ("The Class Neurosis: Social Trajectories and Identity Conflicts"). Paris; Payot & Rivages, 2016. ISBN 978-2-228-91643-1
- Jaquet, Chantal. Les transclasses ou La non-reproduction ("Transclasses: A Theory of Social Non-reproduction"). Paris; PUF, 2014. ISBN 978-2-13063-182-8
- Jaquet, Chantal, et Bras, Gérard (dir.). La fabrique des transclasses (“The Making of Transclasses” or “The Transclass Factory”). Paris; PUF, 2018. ISBN 978-2-13081-102-2
- Jaquet, Chantal. Révolutions transclasses: Une nouvelle théorie de l'émancipation ("Transclass Revolutions: A New Theory of Emancipation"). Paris; PUF, 2026. ISBN 978-2-13-089106-2
- Lagrave, Rose-Marie. Se ressaisir: enquête autobiographique d'une transfuge de classe féministe ("Pulling Oneself Together: An Autobiographical Investigation of a Feminist Class Defector"). Paris; la Découverte, 2021. ISBN 978-2-348-04503-5
- Louis, Édouard. En finir avec Eddy Bellegueule ("The End of Eddy (Bellegueule)". Paris; Seuil, 2014. ISBN 978-2-7578-5297-2
- Véron, Laélia, et Abiven, Karine. Trahir et venger: Paradoxes des récits de transfuges de classe ("Betrayal and Revenge: Paradoxes in the Narratives of Class Defectors"). Paris; La Découverte, 2024. ISBN 978-234808-261-0
