= Chantal Singer =

Canadian water skier

Chantal Singer is a Canadian water skier from Toronto, Ontario, Canada.

She began Water skiing at the age of 4. She has competed in international competitions and won first place in three Pan-American waterski championships, in the years 2010, 2012 and 2016. As of 2017, she attends and skis collegiately for Rollins College, a liberal arts school located in Winter Park, Florida.

Singer is a member of the Ontario Water Ski Team and the under 21 Canadian Water Ski Team.
