= Nigeria Data Protection Commission =

Nigeria's data protection authority

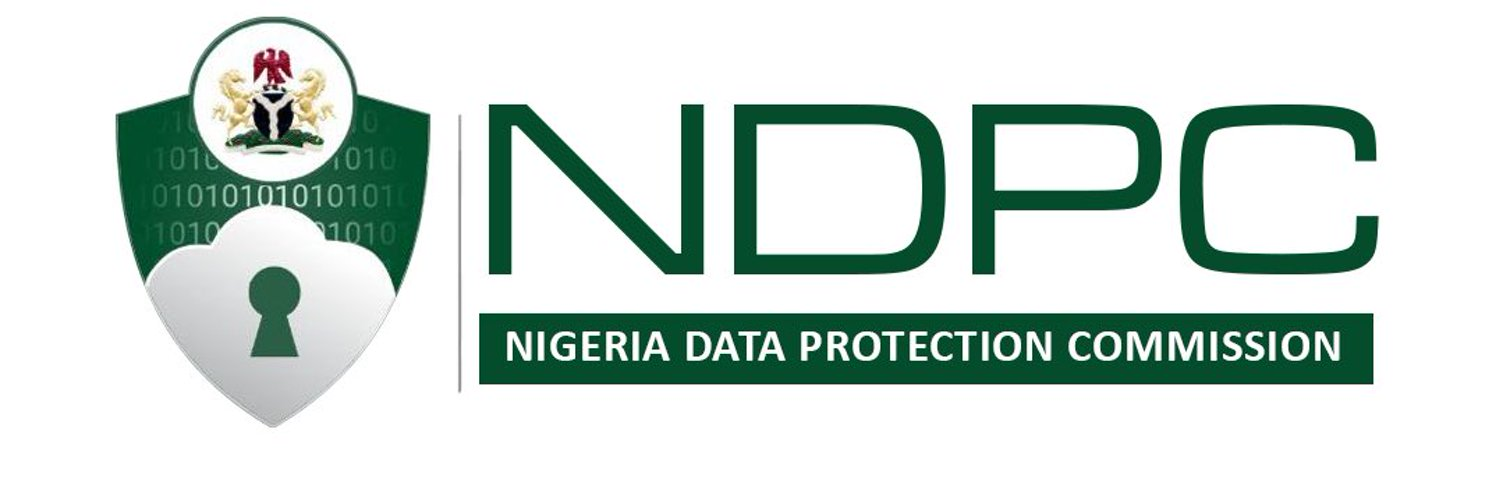

Agency overview
- Formed: 2022
- Jurisdiction: Federal Government of Nigeria
- Headquarters: No.12 Clement Isong Street, Asokoro, Abuja
- Agency executive: Dr. Vincent Olatunji, CEO
- Website: ndpc.gov.ng//

The National Data Protection Commission (NDPC) is a statutory Nigerian organization that is responsible for the regulation of data privacy in Nigeria. It was created by the Nigeria Data Protection Bureau (NDPB) in February 2022, as a mandate to oversee the implementation of the Nigeria Data Protection Regulation (NDPR) which was issued by the National Information Technology Development Agency (NITDA) in 2019 as a subsidiary legislation of The NITDA Act, 2007.

== History ==
On the 7 of March 2022, the Nigeria Data Protection Bureau hosted representatives of The Nigerian Association of Chambers of Commerce, Industry, Mines, and Agriculture (NACCIMA). The delegation was led by the Chairman, Digital Economy Group, Prince Adetokunbo Kayode, SAN, CON. In February 2023, the commission partnered with the Voice of Nigeria (VON) to harness the Fourth Industrial Revolution (FIR) era and promote Data Protection and Privacy in the country. They stressed the need for capacity building of staff to ensure efficiency and productive output in the Voice of Nigeria in line with emerging technologies, as the 4IR is an enabler of inclusive industrialization. In March 2024, The Commission launched an investigation into an alleged privacy breach at the National Identity Management Commission (NIMC).

== Data Controller/ Processor ==
The commission is responsible for enforcing data protection laws and ensuring compliance with data protection standards in Nigeria. NDPC aims to safeguard the privacy rights of individuals and promote responsible data management practices across various sectors.

== Data Protection Compliance Organisation (DPCO) ==
According to the commission, Article 1(3j) of the Nigerian Data Protection Regulation provides that a Data Protection Compliance Organisation (DPCO) is any entity duly licensed by NDPB for the purpose of training, auditing, consulting and rendering services aimed at ensuring compliance with this Regulation or any foreign Data Protection law or regulation having effect in Nigeria. A DPCO may be one or more of the following; a professional service, a consultancy firm, an IT service provider, an audit firm, or a law firm.
