= VeryDarkMan =

Nigerian social media influencer, online police (born 1994)

- Born: Martins Vincent Otse; 8 April 1994 (age 32); Abuja, Nigeria
- Other names: VDM; Verydarkblackman; VeryBlackman; The Ratel
- Occupations: Activist; Philanthropist
- Years active: 2022–present
- Movement: Advocacy; Civil rights; Internet activism; Revolutionary; Environmental movement; Political

Instagram information
- Page: Martins Vincent Otse
- Followers: 3.1M (April 2026)

TikTok information
- Page: RATEL
- Followers: 452.5K (March 2026)

YouTube information
- Channel: VERYDARKBLACKMAN
- Subscribers: 390K (March 2026)
- Website: MVOI Official Website

Martins Vincent Otse (born 8 April 1994), popularly known as VeryDarkMan, is a Nigerian social media influencer, human right and social activist, philanthropist, and self-described "online police" who is a prominent figure in Nigerian civil and political rights.

He is a controversial figure notable for his condemnation and advocacy against the injustice, corruption, crime, and insecurity in Nigeria. He grew up in Abuja, Nigeria.

== Early life ==
Martins Vincent Otse was born on 8 April 1994 in Abuja, Nigeria. Although born in Abuja, he is originally from Agenebode, Edo State, in southern Nigeria. He spent his formative years in the Federal Capital Territory, Abuja.

== Career and public recognition ==
VeryDarkMan's social media activism career commenced in 2022. Initially, he gained attention through his interactions with Nigerian celebrities, which led to an increase in his online following. Subsequently, he began posting a series of videos that sparked controversy. By early 2023, his content had gone viral, further amplifying the controversy surrounding his online presence.

In January 2024, Otse was nominated for the Silverbird's Most Influential Social Media Influencer of the Year award.

== Philanthropy ==
=== Martins Vincent Otse Initiative ===
In October 2024, Otse founded the Martins Vincent Otse Initiative (MVOI), a non-governmental organisation headquartered in Abuja focused on public education reform, community development, and financial transparency within the non-profit sector. The organisation raised over ₦33 million from small-scale donors within its first 24 hours of launch. A subsequent ₦100 million donation from music executive Don Jazzy drew national attention to the initiative and sparked wider discussion about celebrity philanthropy in Nigerian social development.

The MVOI operates a public financial tracking system, publishing real-time bank statements and donation logs on its official website as a measure to build trust in the Nigerian non-profit sector. In January 2025, legal experts raised concerns that the publication of unredacted donor information could potentially conflict with Nigeria Data Protection Commission (NDPC) guidelines.

Among the initiative's stated goals is the deployment of National Youth Service Corps (NYSC) members as teaching assistants in underserved communities to address teacher shortages in public schools. In July 2025, the MVOI funded the installation of boreholes in the Dibilli community in the Karaga District, Ghana. To address local water scarcity.

In April 2025, Otse donated ₦20 million through the MVOI to the National Agency for the Prohibition of Trafficking in Persons (NAPTIP) to fund the repatriation and rehabilitation of underage Nigerian girls trafficked to Ivory Coast. Following the donation, 70 trafficked girls were subsequently repatriated to Nigeria, with Air Peace providing flights for the rescue operation at no cost.

In December 2024, Otse claimed that ₦180 million had been stolen from the NGO's accounts through a hacking incident, before later stating that the claim was a deliberate experiment designed to test the speed of misinformation spread within Nigerian digital media.

Amongst Ortse's philanthropical impacts, Martins Otse also sponsored a young tech enthusiast innovative Nigeria who creates his contents around simplification of technological products on Tiktok and Instagram. Ortse spent over N60,000,000 in ensuring the young Nigerian pursue his dream.

=== Ratel Movement ===
Otse founded the Ratel Movement, a civic movement whose members he describes as the "fourth arm of government" in Nigeria, symbolised by a honey badger(another name for the animal called ratel). The movement is an informal group of followers organised around grassroots civic action, with Otse describing its purpose as moving beyond social media advocacy toward direct community impact.

From November 29 2025, the Ratel Movement began conducting monthly community service projects across Nigeria on the last Saturday of each month, covering activities such as cleaning public spaces, clearing drainages, and rehabilitating school facilities across all 36 states. Otse has stated that the movement is strictly non-political. In late 2025, he opened a dedicated Ratel office in Abuja, equipped with a reception area, studio, conference room, and a customer care desk where members of the public can lodge complaints or requests for community infrastructure.

== Controversies ==
Otse was arrested in March 2024 on allegations of cyberbullying and cyberstalking, including false accusations against Nigerian actresses and officials. He pleaded not guilty and was remanded in police custody until his hearing on May 29, 2024. After two weeks in detention, he was released. In June 2024, he was arrested again at his Abuja residence on defamation charges related to a social media expose. Otse was questioned by police on June 30, 2024, regarding defamation allegations and released shortly after. No arrest was made, contrary to initial reports.

On September 26, 2024, Falana & Falana Chambers issued a 24-hour ultimatum to Otse via a letter, demanding an immediate retraction and apology for allegedly defamatory statements against Femi Falana, made in his September 25, 2024 Instagram post.

On May 2, 2025, he was arrested on allegations not made known to the public, shortly after he visited Guarantee Trust Bank branch in Abuja, where he complained about alleged unauthorized deduction of funds from his mother's account. This arrest was carried out by masked men whose identities were later revealed as EFCC operatives. After five days in detention, he was released on administrative bail on 7 May, 2025.

Otse was accused of inciting Onista bridge head drug traders to defy regulatory order in a statement released by the National Agency for Food and Drug Administration and Control's Director General, Prof. Mojisola Adeyeye, on May 26th, 2025. This was shortly after Otse visited the Ogbo Ogwu market and called out the DG of NAFDAC to stop the extortion as it was allegedly said by the traders that they have to pay a certain amount of money before they can embark on their business.

On 16th June, 2025, following the Yelewata massacre in Benue State. Otse was engaged in a peaceful protest alongside the youth of the community demanding for immediate intervention of the Nigeria government, President Bola Ahmed Tinubu and the Benue State government. as the protesters cover the Wurukum food market round-about Makurdi.

A week later, he led another protest with primary school pupils in Abuja over nine-week primary school teachers' strike for the failure of area council chairpersons to implement the new national minimum wage of N70,000.
