= Claudine Chatel =

Canadian actress

- Born: Claudine Cabay; 3 October 1951 (age 74); Verviers, Belgium
- Other name: Claudine Cabay Chatel
- Occupations: Actor, writer
- Television: Les Berger; Le Clan Beaulieu
- Father: Marcel Cabay
- Website: Official website

Claudine Chatel (born Claudine Cabay; 3 October 1951) is a Québécoise actress who had mainly worked on television soap operas before she specialized in voice dubbing. She is the daughter of actor and screenwriter Marcel Cabay.

Chatel published two books under the name Claudine Cabay Chatel.

== Biography ==
Born in Verviers, Belgium, Claudine Chatel arrived in Québec with her family in 1953. She trained in drama and then began as an actress at CKVL in the radio drama Côte Vertu when she was seventeen. In 1970, she appeared for the first time on television in the soap opera Les Berger (transl. The Shepherds) presented on TVA. She played the role of Ginette Berger during the eight seasons of the programme, and continued the role in the spin-off series Le Clan Beaulieu.

Chatel began voice dubbing in 1987 as an actress and stage director, then devoted herself almost exclusively to this field after the death of her father in 1990. She has dubbed well-known actresses like Shirley MacLaine, Barbra Streisand, Sissy Spacek and Susan Sarandon. She has also taught dubbing at the Montreal Conservatory of Dramatic Art since 1995.

Chatel published a biography of her father, Des pas dans mon mémoire (transl. Footsteps in my memory), in 2008, followed by a novel, L'éternité... c'est pour quand?, in 2014.

=== Personal life ===
Chatel has struggled with depression and anxiety. Her daughter encouraged her to begin therapy, and Chatel started writing about her family's history in order to move past the traumas of her past. This included the disappearance and murder of her niece, Melanie, a crime which has never been solved; the death of her parents; and two confusing and depressing years spent in the Church of Scientology.

== Works ==
=== Filmography ===
- 1970 – Les Berger (television series): Ginette Berger
- 1978 – Le Clan Beaulieu (television series): Ginette Beaulieu
- 1981 – The Champions: narrator
- 1986 – L'Or du temps (English: The Gold of Time) (television series): Marie-Christine Vanier
- 1990 – Nathaël et la chasse au phoques (Nathaniel and the seal hunt): voices
- 2003 – Les Enfants du feu (The Children of Fire, TV series): Helgwart
- 2014 – Une nouvelle Amie (A New Friend) by François Ozon

=== Theatre ===
- 1980 – Poutoulik of Henri Deyglun at Théâtre des Marguerites
- 1990 – Monsieur Masure of Claude Magnier at Théâtre d'Ete le Saint-Laurent

=== Books ===
- Des pas dans ma mémoire. Publistar. 2008. p. 312. ISBN 9782895622130.
- Chatel, Claudine Cabay (2014). L'éternité... c'est pour quand?. Éditions La Semaine. p. 320. ISBN 978-2-89703-207-4.
