= Jean-Baptiste François Ernest de Chatelain =

Jean-Baptiste François Ernest de Chatelain (Chevalier de Chatelain; 19 January 1801 – 15 August 1881) was a French writer and translator. He lived in England from 1842, and was the husband of the writer and translator Clara de Chatelain.

== Life ==
De Chatelain was born in Paris in 1801, and was educated at the Collège des Ecossais and at the Lycée Charlemagne. On coming to England he started a weekly paper in London, called Le Petit Mercure, the name of which he changed to Le Mercure de Londres in 1826. In the following year he went on foot from Paris to Rome, to study the sayings and doings of Pope Leo XII.

In Bordeaux, in 1830, he was employed in editing Le Propagateur de la Gironde, an employment which led to his being condemned to six months' imprisonment and a fine of 1,320 francs on 5 May 1831. Between 1833 and 1838 he published many works in Paris, and was rewarded by receiving the Prussian Order of Civil Merit in 1835. He returned to England in 1842.

In April 1843 in London he married Clara Du Mazet de Pontigny. He became a British national in 1848. In the following years they lived mainly in London, but spent some time each year in Lyndhurst, Hampshire, where they took long walks in the New Forest. From this time he published upwards of fifty works. His best known book is Beautés de la Poésie Anglaise, in 5 volumes 1860–72, containing over one thousand translations of selections, from Geoffrey Chaucer to Alfred Lord Tennyson. His Rambles through Rome, brought out in 1852, also attracted some attention. His opinions were entirely republican: in Ronces et Chardons, 1869, he strongly denounced the Emperor Napoleon III under the title of Chenapan III.

He died at Castelnau Lodge, 20 Warwick Crescent, Regent's Park, London, on 15 August 1881, and was buried at Lyndhurst churchyard on 22 August, where his wife had been buried in 1876.
