= Chantelle =

Chantelle can refer to:

== People ==
- Chantelle (1991–2024), Nigerian sex worker who was murdered in 2024
- Chantelle Anderson (born 1981), American basketball player
- Chantelle Barry (born 1980), Australian singer and actress
- Chantelle Eberle (born 1981) Canadian curler
- Chantelle Fiddy, British journalist
- Chantelle Handy (born 1987), British basketball player
- Chantelle Houghton (born 1983), English model and non-celebrity winner of Celebrity Big Brother 4 in 2006
- Chantelle Kerry (born 1996), Australian figure skater
- Chantelle Newbery (born 1977), Australian diver, 2004 Olympic champion
- Chantelle Nickson-Clark (fl. 2023–2025), American politician
- Chantelle Paige (1988) American singer-songwriter and actress
- Chantelle Reid (born 1998), English boxer

== Places ==
- Chantelle, Allier, a commune of the Allier département in France
- Canton of Chantelle, an administrative division in central France
- Chantelle, Pretoria, South Africa, a suburb of Pretoria

== Other uses ==
- Chantelle Atkins, a character in the soap opera EastEnders
- Chantelle (band), a Puerto Rican merengue musical group
- Chantelle (lingerie), a French women's underwear trademark
- Chantelle, a name for a female partridge
- Tropical Storm Chantelle, a 1996 Indian Ocean tropical cyclone

== See also ==
- Chantal (disambiguation)
