= German trawler V 303 Tannenberg =

German fishing trawler used in WWII as a vorpostenboot

History
- Name: Tannenberg (1935–70); Panaghia (1970–75); Nikos (1975); Chantal (1975–78)
- Namesake: Tannenberg
- Owner: Nordsee Deutsche Hochseefischerei Bremen-Cuxhaven AG (1935–39); Kriegsmarine (1939–45); Nordsee Deutsche Hochseefischerei Bremen-Cuxhaven AG (1945–58); E Böse (1958–66); K Kruse (1966–70)
- Port of registry: (Nazi Germany) Cuxhaven, Germany (1935–39); Kriegsmarine (1939–45); Cuxhaven, Allied-occupied Germany (1945–49); Cuxhaven, West Germany (1949–58); Emden, West Germany (1958–70); Greece (1970–75); Panama (1975–78)
- Builder: Deschimag
- Yard number: 527
- Launched: May 1935
- Completed: July 1935
- Commissioned: 23 September 1939
- Out of service: 26 June 1978
- Identification: Code Letters DJPI (1935–58); Fishing boat registration HC 293 (1935–39, 1945–48); Pennant Number V 303 (1939–45); Fishing boat registration BX 541 (1948–58); Code Letters DAKR (1958–70)
- Fate: Wrecked

General characteristics
- Type: Fishing trawler (1935–39, 1945–58); Vorpostenboot (1939–45); Cargo ship (1958–78)
- Tonnage: 422 GRT, 160 NRT
- Length: 55.20 m (181 ft 1 in)
- Beam: 8.00 m (26 ft 3 in)
- Draught: 4.15 m (13 ft 7 in)
- Depth: 4.65 m (15 ft 3 in)
- Installed power: Triple expansion steam engine, 92nhp (1935–58); Diesel engine (1958–72)
- Propulsion: Single screw propeller
- Speed: 12 knots (22 km/h) (1935–58); 8 1/2 knots (15.7 km/h) (1958–78)

V 303 Tannenberg was a German fishing trawler that was requisitioned in the Second World War by the Kriegsmarine for use as a vorpostenboot. She was returned to her owners post war. In 1958, she was re-engined and converted to a cargo ship. In 1970 she was sold to Greece and renamed Panaghia. She was sold to Panama in 1975 and was renamed Nikos then Chantal. She was wrecked in 1978.

== Description ==
The ship was 55.20 metres (181 ft 1 in) long, with a beam of 8.00 metres (26 ft 3 in). She had a depth of 4.65 metres (15 ft 3 in) and a draught of 4.15 metres (13 ft 7 in). She was assessed at 372 GRT, 140 NRT. She was powered by a triple expansion steam engine, which had cylinders of 35 centimetres (13 3/4 in), 55 centimetres (21 5/8 in) and 90.0 centimetres (35 7/16 in) diameter by 64.9 centimetres (25 9/16 in) stroke. The engine was built by Deschimag Seebeckwerft, Wesermünde, Germany. It was rated at 92nhp. It drove a single screw propeller, and could propel the ship at 11 knots (20 km/h).

== History ==
Tannenberg was built at yard number 527 by Deschimag Seebeckwerft, Wesermünde for the Nordsee Deutsche Hochseefischerei AG, Cuxhaven. She was launched in May 1935 and completed in July. The fishing boat registration HC 293 was allocated, as were the Code Letters DJPI.

On 23 September 1939, Tannenberg was requisitioned by the Kriegsmarine for use as a vorpostenboot. She was allocated to 3 Vorpostenflotille as V 303 Tannenburg. On 5 January 1941, she sank or was sunk. She was raised, repaired and returned to service.

Tannenberg was returned to her owners post-war. In 1948, her registration was changed to BX 541. In 1958, she was sold to E. Böse, Emden, West Germany. In that year, a diesel engine was fitted and she was converted to a cargo ship. The engine was a four stroke single acting type. It had 6 cylinders of 320 millimetres (12 5/8 in) diameter by 450 millimetres (17 11/16 in) stroke. It was built by Klöckner-Humboldt-Deutz, Köln, West Germany, and propelled the vessel at a speed of 8 1/2 knots (15.7 km/h). She was sold to K. Kruse, Emden in 1966. In 1970, Tannenberg was sold to Greece and renamed Panaghia. She was sold to Panama in 1975 and was renamed Nikos, then Chantal later that year. On 25 June 1978, Chantal sprang a leak 9 nautical miles (17 km) off Cape Engaño, Dominican Republic and was beached. She was declared a total loss.

== Sources ==
- Gröner, Erich (1993). Die deutschen Kriegsschiffe 1815-1945 (in German). Vol. 8/I: Flußfahrzeuge, Ujäger, Vorpostenboote, Hilfsminensucher, Küstenschutzverbände (Teil 1). Koblenz: Bernard & Graefe. ISBN 3-7637-4807-5.
