= Chastellain =

Chastellain is a French surname. Notable people with the surname include:

- Georges Chastellain (1415–1475), Burgundian chronicler
- Pierre Chastellain (1606–1684), Jesuit missionary
- Jean Chastellain (1490–1541), Master glassmaker
