= Clara de Chatelain =

English writer, composer and translator (1807–1876)

Clara de Chatelain, (pseudonyms, Leopold Wray, Baronne Cornélie de B., Rosalia Santa Croce and Leopoldine Ziska; 31 July 1807 – 30 June 1876) was an English writer, composer and translator.

== Life ==
Clara Du Mazet de Pontigny was born in London, 31 July 1807. She was the daughter of M. de Pontigny, a French gentleman, and his English wife Mary. Living in France in 1826, she wrote an elegy on Jacques-Louis David's death, 'Le Tombeau du Proscrit'. Returning to England in 1827, she wrote widely under her pseudonym Leopold Wray, and for periodicals including Reynolds's Miscellany, London Society, The Queen, Chambers's Journal and Le Courrier de l'Europe. On 13 April 1843 she married Jean-Baptiste François Ernest de Chatelain, with whom she enjoyed walking tours in the New Forest. The couple befriended Victor Hugo and his wife while staying in Jersey and Guernsey.

Clara de Chatelain was a prolific writer: she translated over 400 songs for musical houses including Wessell, Myers and Schott; her books of fairy-tales included 140 original tales and 50 retellings of classic fairy tales; and she also wrote 16 handbooks. One of her last works was to translate the Italian libretto of Lucia di Lammermoor into English. She died insane in London, 30 June 1876, and was buried in Lyndhurst on 7 July 1876. She left many unpublished works, including a novel, The Queen of the Spa, and a short story Our New Governors.

== Selected works ==
- The Silver Swan: a fairy tale, 1847
- Handbook of the Four Elements of Vocalisation, 1850
- Child's Own Book of Fairy Tales, 1850
- Merry Tales for Little Folk, 1851
- Little Folks' Books, 1857
- The Sedan Chair; and, Sir Wilfrid's seven flights, 1866
- Truly Noble, 1870
