= Chantal Gondang =

Cameroonian dancer and choreographer

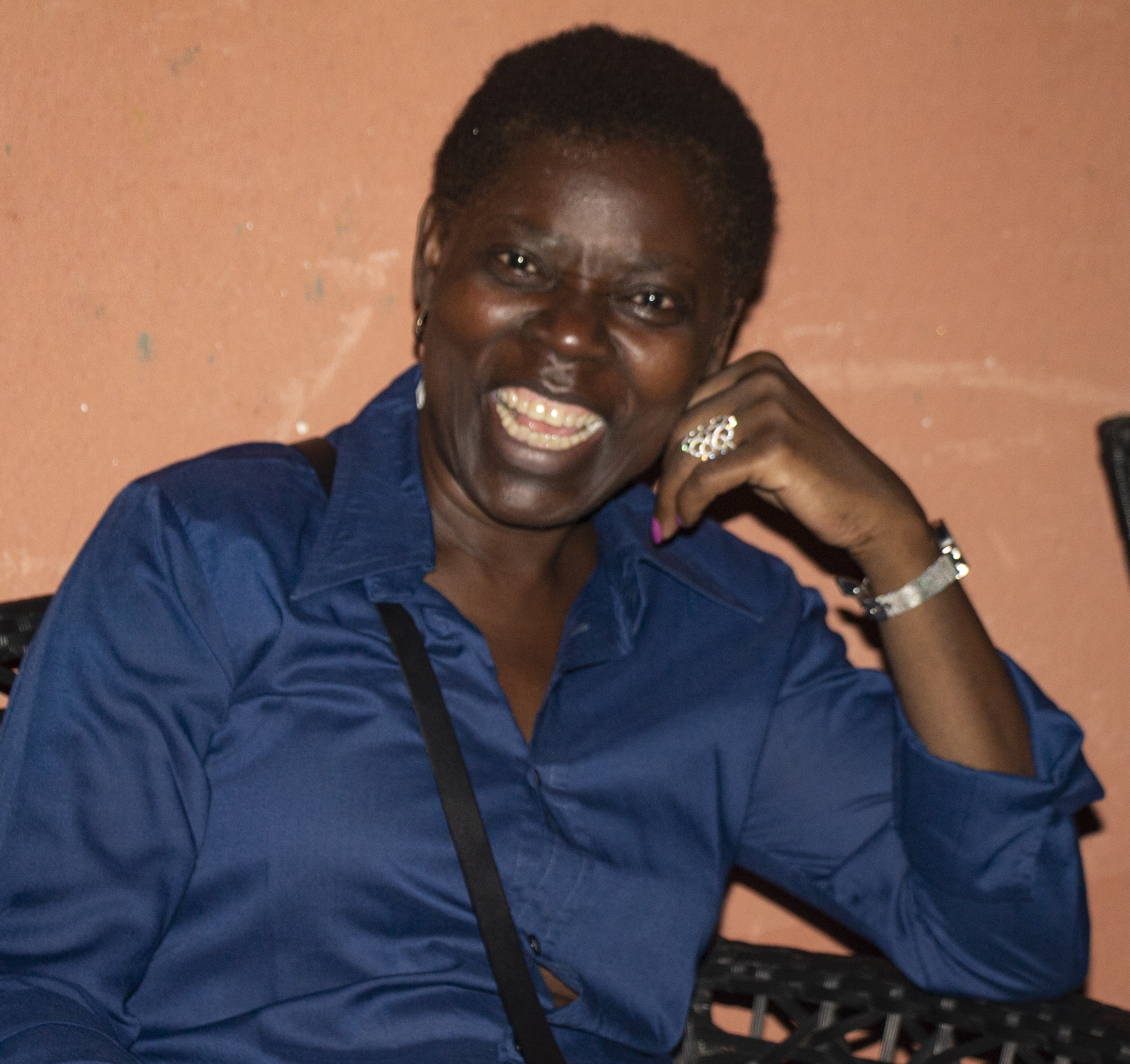
- Born: Cameroon
- Occupations: Dancer, choreographer, dance teacher and artistic director
- Years active: 1982–present
- Known for: Founder of the Chantal Gondang Company

Chantal Gondang is a Cameroonian dancer, choreographer, dance teacher and artistic director.

== Biography ==
Gondang was born in Cameroon and settled in France in 1982, when she was aged 18. She moved to France to pursue a career as a dancer, despite how her family had expressed that they wished to see their daughter become a doctor or an engineer. In France, Gondang trained at the House of Youth and Cultures (French: la Maison des jeunes et des cultures) and studied ballet, jazz and Latin dance styles. She was introduced to contemporary dance by Peter Goss. She draws inspiration from traditional folkloric African dance forms to create Afro-contemporary dance forms.

From 1989, Gondang taught dance at schools in Paris, France. In April 2001, she founded the Chantal Gondang Company, of which she is the choreographer and artistic director, and began organising dance exchanges between Cameroon and France. From 2004, Gondang ran the Sanaga dance school in Le Plessis-Trévise, Île-de-France.

After returning to Cameroon in 2013, Gondang established her dance company in Douala, Cameroon. The company have performed at the Goethe-Institut in Munich, Germany; at the European Contemporary Dance Festival in Poland; at the Biennale Euro-Africa in Montpellier, France; at the Cartoucherie de Paris in France; and at the MAM Gallery in Douala, Cameroon.

In 2014, Gondang worked on a performance inspired by the African American singer-songwriter and civil rights activist Nina Simone.

In 2019, Gondang choreographed the musical comedy Les coépouses (The co-wives), which tells the story of a widowed mother called Magwé and her son Nsemen in the village of Bigna. Magwé attempts to impose four co-wives on Nsemen, who instead falls in love with a rebellious girl named Kétura. The story is told through the traditional dances from different regions of Cameroon, mixed with modern dance.

In 2021, Gondang presented "Le Cri du Silence" (The Cry of Silence) at the French Institute of Cameroon in Douala. The performance explored the psychological, sexual and socio-economic repercussions of violence against men.
