= Chantal Jaquet =

French philosopher

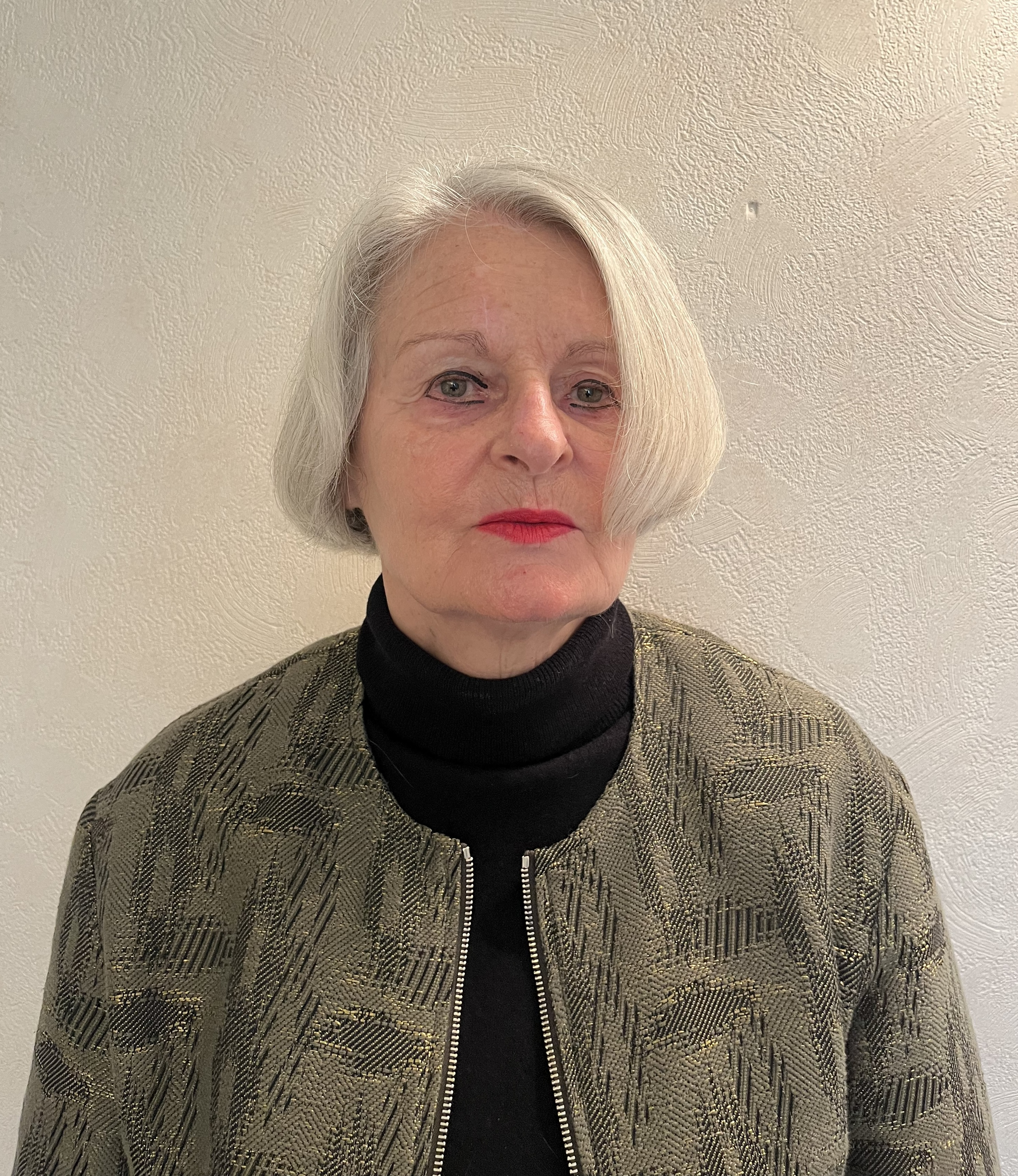
- Self-portrait by Chantal Jaquet, 2026
- Born: 1956 (age 69–70)
- Occupations: Philosopher, university professor

Academic background
- Education: École normale supérieure de Fontenay-aux-Roses, Université Paris-Sorbonne (doctorate)
- Thesis: Sub specie aeternitatis: A Study of the Concepts of Time, Duration, and Eternity in Spinoza
- Doctoral advisor: Jean-Marie Beyssade

Academic work
- Discipline: Philosophy
- Sub-discipline: Spinoza; philosophy of the body; history of modern philosophy
- Institutions: Université Paris-I-Panthéon-Sorbonne
- Notable ideas: Transclasses; philosophy of smell

Chantal Jaquet (Note: French pronunciation: [ʃɑ̃tal ʒake].) (born 1956) is a French philosopher and professor emerita at the Paris 1 Panthéon-Sorbonne University.

Jaquet's research focuses on Spinoza, the history of modern philosophy, social philosophy, and the philosophy of the body. She was the director of the Center for the History of Modern Philosophy at Sorbonne from 2018 to 2021. She founded the journal "Philonsorbonne", the official publication of the doctoral program in philosophy, which she directed from 2006 to 2016. She edits the series "The Ancients and the Moderns: Philosophical Studies" (French: Les Anciens et les Modernes: études de philosophie) published by Classiques Garnier.

The Süddeutsche Zeitung has described Jaquet, alongside Annie Ernaux, Didier Eribon, and Édouard Louis, as a representative of écriture sociologique ("sociological writing"), which foregrounds social stratification as a literary theme.

Jaquet builds on Pierre Bourdieu’s theories and reconceptualizes social mobility as “class transition”.

== Biography ==
Chantal Jaquet was born in Tincave, a mountain hamlet in Savoy, France. In 2021, she gave an interview with Jean-Marie Durand and described her childhood as "marked by poverty and precariousness". Her mother was a housewife, and her father worked successively as a shepherd, miner, and local council worker. As a scholarship student at the collège d'enseignement général (college) in Bozel, she passed the entrance examination for the École normale d'institutrices de Savoie at the age of 15.

She was admitted to the École normale supérieure in Fontenay-aux-Roses and passed the Agrégation in Philosophy. Following her secondment to the Paris Education Authority, she taught as an Agrégée (holder of the agrégation) successively at grammar schools in Flers and Draguignan, and in the Parisian suburbs of Étampes and Athis-Mons.

Jaquet defended her doctoral thesis on "Sub specie aeternitatis: An Examination of the Concepts of Time, Duration and Eternity in Spinoza" under the supervision of Jean-Marie Beyssade in 1994. She was appointed lecturer at the University of Paris 1 Panthéon-Sorbonne the following year. She obtained her habilitation on the topic of "Forms of Expression of Agency" and was appointed professor at the University of Paris 1 Panthéon-Sorbonne.

== Research work ==
Jaquet's research includes work on Spinoza, agency, the body, and the senses. In Sub specie aeternitatis, she examined Spinoza's concepts of eternity and duration. In L'unité du corps et de l'esprit, she rejected psychophysical parallelism as an adequate description of Spinoza's account of mind and body. Reviewing the English translation in 2019, philosopher Amy M. Schmitter characterized Jaquet's interpretation as revisionist and argued that it offered a principled explanation for shifts of perspective in Spinoza's Ethics. Jaquet has also written on the philosophy of the body, smell, and contemporary olfactory art.

In 2021, she explored Hobbes' conception of the individual and examined the terms subditus and subjectum and their relationship within Spinoza's philosophy.

Jaquet coined the term transclass (Note: French: transclasse, pronounced [tʁɑ̃sklas].) to describe people who move from one social class to another. The term was intended to encompass movement in either direction between classes without the judgment implied by the French expression transfuge de classe. In their introduction to a 2023 interview with Jaquet published by RPTU in Landau's literature portal lit.fr.2000, Lars Henk and Lea Sauer described her 2014 book Les transclasses ou la non-reproduction as a major success and stated that the concept of the transclasse had become established in contemporary discussions of class and working-class literature. Mediapart similarly noted in 2026 that the concept had been taken up in literature. In Révolutions transclasses (2026), Jaquet extended her earlier work by examining the conditions under which movement between classes could contribute to collective emancipation; Le Monde described the book as a continuation of the inquiry begun in Les transclasses ou la non-reproduction.

== Public recognition ==
Jaquet was the invited guest of honor at the 26th edition of the CitéPhilo festival on 13 November 2022. The event is held annually in the Hauts-de-France region promoting philosophical reflection in the public sphere. Jaquet was named one of the "100 Women of Culture" of the year by the association Femmes de Culture in 2023. In 2026, Jaquet was an invited speaker at the Philosophia Festival, held in Saint-Émilion from 29 to 31 May. The Philosophia Festival attracts around 5,000 attendees each year and is dedicated to popularizing philosophy, art, and science and to making knowledge accessible to a broad public.

== Publications ==
=== Books authored ===
==== French works ====
- Le Désir ("Desire"). Paris: Éditions Quintette, 1991; reissued September 2003. ISBN 978-2-86850-123-3
- Sub specie aeternitatis, étude des concepts de temps durée et éternité chez Spinoza ("Sub specie aeternitatis: Study of the concepts of time, duration, and eternity in Spinoza"). Paris: Kimé, 1997; foreword by Alexandre Matheron. ISBN 978-2-84174-071-0
  - New edition, Classiques Garnier, 2015. ISBN 978-2-8124-3590-4
- Spinoza ou la Prudence ("Spinoza or Prudence"). Paris: Éditions Quintette, 1997; reissued 2004. ISBN 978-2-86850-133-2
- Le Corps ("The Body"). Paris: PUF, Philosopher, 2001. ISBN 978-2-13-051624-8
- L’unité du corps et de l’esprit. Affects, actions et passions chez Spinoza ("The Unity of Body and Mind: Affects, Actions, and Passions in Spinoza"). Paris: PUF, 2004; reissued 2015. ISBN 978-2-13-054204-9
- Les expressions de la puissance d’agir chez Spinoza ("Expressions of the Power to Act in Spinoza"). Paris: Publications de la Sorbonne, 2005. ISBN 978-2-85944-537-9
- Philosophie de l’odorat ("Philosophy of the Sense of Smell"), Paris: PUF, 2010. ISBN 978-2-13-057914-4
- Bacon et la promotion des savoirs ("Bacon and the Dissemination of Knowledge"), Paris: PUF, 2010. ISBN 978-2-13-056857-5
- Les Transclasses ou la Non-Reproduction ("Between the Classes: On the Non-Reproduction of Social Power"), Paris: PUF, 2014. ISBN 978-2-13-063182-8
- Les liens corps esprit, regards croisés à partir de cas cliniques. ("The Body-Mind Connection: Perspectives from Clinical Cases"); in collaboration with Pauline Neveu, Eric Pireyre, Fabrice de Sainte Maréville, and Philippe Scialom, Paris: Dunod, 2014. ISBN 978-2-10-070588-7
- Le Désir ("The Desire"), Paris: Éditions du Retour, 2017; New Edition. ISBN 978-2-9557906-1-8
- Spinoza à l'œuvre, composition des corps et force des idées ("Spinoza at Work: The Composition of Bodies and the Power of Ideas"), Éditions de la Sorbonne, 2017. ISBN 978-2-85944-984-1
- Philosophie du kôdô : l'esthétique japonaise des fragrances ("Philosophy of Kôdô: The Japanese Aesthetics of Fragrance"), Paris: Vrin, 2018. ISBN 978-2-7116-2851-3
- Juste en passant ("Just in Passing"), with Jean-Marie Durand, Paris: PUF, 2021. ISBN 978-2-13-082782-5

==== English translations ====
- Transclasses: A theory of Social Non-reproduction. Translated by Elliott, Gregory. London, New York: Verso Books, 2023. ISBN 978-1-83976-885-9

=== Edited volumes ===
- Les trois erreurs de Bacon et de Descartes selon Spinoza ("The Three Errors of Bacon and Descartes According to Spinoza"), No. 6 of the Revue de l’Enseignement philosophique ("Journal of Philosophy Education"), July–August 1997. Proceedings of the colloquium held on March 22, 1997, chaired by Chantal Jaquet.
- L'Héritage baconien au XVIIe et au XVIIIe siècles ("The Baconian Legacy in the 17th and 18th Centuries"), Paris: Kimé, 2000.
- Fortitude et servitude, Lectures de l’Éthique IV de Spinoza ("Fortitude and Servitude: Readings on Spinoza’s Ethics IV"), in collaboration with Pascal Sévérac and Ariel Suhamy; Kimé, 2003.
- Les Pensées métaphysiques de Spinoza ("Spinoza’s Metaphysical Thoughts"), edited by Chantal Jaquet; Publications de la Sorbonne, 2004.
- Les significations du « corps » dans la philosophie classique ("The Meanings of the ‘Body’ in Classical Philosophy"), edited by Chantal Jaquet and Tamas Pavlovits; L’Harmattan, 2004.
- Spinoza, Philosophe de l’amour ("Spinoza, Philosopher of Love"), edited by Chantal Jaquet, Ariel Suhamy, and Pascal Sévérac; Presses de Saint-Étienne, 2005.
- Les Facultés de l’âme à l’âge classique ("The Powers of the Soul in Classical Antiquity"), edited by Chantal Jaquet and Tamas Pavlovits; Publications de la Sorbonne, 2006.
- La Multitude libre. Nouvelles lectures du Traité politique de Spinoza ("The Free Multitude. New Interpretations of Spinoza’s Political Treatise"), edited by Chantal Jaquet, Ariel Suhamy, and Pascal Sévérac; Éditions Amsterdam, 2008.
- La théorie spinoziste des rapports corps/esprit et ses usages actuels ("Spinoza's Theory of the Relationship Between Body and Mind and Its Contemporary Applications"); Paris, Hermann, 2009.
- Spinoza Transalpin, les interprétations actuelles en Italie ("Spinoza Transalpin: Contemporary Interpretations in Italy"), edited by Chantal Jaquet and Pierre-François Moreau; Publications de la Sorbonne, 2012. ISBN 978-2-85944-691-8
- L’art du portrait conceptuel, Deleuze et l’histoire de la philosophie ("The Art of the Conceptual Portrait, Deleuze and the History of Philosophy"), edited by Axel Cherniasky and Chantal Jaquet; Éditions Classiques Garnier, 2013. ISBN 978-2-8124-1055-0
- El arte del retrato conceptual. Deleuze y la historia de la filosofía ("The Art of the Conceptual Portrait: Deleuze and the History of Philosophy"), edited by Axel Cherniasky and Chantal Jaquet; Buenos Aires, Eduvim, 2014. ISBN 978-987-699-143-8
- L'art olfactif contemporain ("Contemporary Olfactory Art"), Proceedings of the symposium "Olfactory Creation" (May 23–24, 2014), edited by Chantal Jaquet; Paris: Éditions Classiques Garnier, 2015. ISBN 978-2-8124-3551-5
- Spinoza Malebranche, à la croisée des interprétations (“"Spinoza and Malebranche: At the Crossroads of Interpretations"), edited by Raffaele Carbone, Chantal Jaquet, and Pierre-François Moreau; Éditions de l'ENS, 2018. ISBN 978-2-84788-978-9
- La fabrique des transclasses ("The Making of Transclasses"), edited by Chantal Jaquet and Gérard Bras; PUF, 2018.
