= Jérémy Chatelain =

French singer, actor, and fashion designer (born 1984)

Jérémy Chatelain (born 19 October 1984) is a French singer, actor, and fashion designer.

== Early life ==
Jérémy Chatelain was born on 19 October 1984 in Créteil, Val-de-Marne, France. In order to enter the Star Academy, Jérémy lied about his age claiming to be 18 when he was actually 17. He proved to have many talents, focusing in particular on music and clothing design. He demonstrated ability as both a songwriter and musician and chose the piano.

== Career ==
The second season of Star Academy began in September 2002 on TF1. Jérémy became a favoured contestant, easily possessing the best sense of style, originality and charisma. However, he was eliminated in November, after 2.5 months living in the Star Academy château.

Jérémy toured France, Belgium and Switzerland with the rest of the contestants in early 2003, while preparing a solo career.

On 28 February 2003, he released his first single "Laisse-moi" ("Leave Me"), which sold over 170 000 copies and hit the Top 10 of the French Top 50 Singles Chart. His second single, "Belle Histoire" ("Beautiful Story"), followed in July 2003.

During the late summer of 2003, he was approached by Bernard Tapie to star in an episode made for him of the French series Commissaire Valence. He accepted and the episode aired in January 2004.

He released his first self-titled album on 28 October 2003, with the third single "Vivre Ça" ("To Live Like That"), about social issues that maintained a serious tone whilst at the same time possessing a pop/rock sound. It was released in December 2003. He wrote or co-wrote and composed eleven of the twelve songs on the album. At the time he was a guest on the third season (2003–2004) of the Star Academy, performing "Vivre Ça" along with another contestant.

"J'aimerai" ("I Will Love"), the fourth and final single, was released in February 2004. He toured France and Switzerland in late 2003 with L5 and solo throughout 2004.

Chatelain often made or altered his own clothes. Fashion was his other big passion. In 2003, he announced the creation of Sir Sid, his own line of clothing and accessories for both men and women. His first collection hit France's stores in 2004.

In early 2006, Jérémy released "Katmandou", the first single to his second album. His second album, Variétés Françaises, was released 13 March 2006. Jérémy toured France in July as part of the L'été Française Des Jeux – Tournée Des Plages RTL where he performed three songs. His latest single is "J'veux Qu'on M'enterre".

== Personal life ==
On 6 November 2003 he married singer Alizée Jacotey. They separated in 2011 and divorced in early 2012.

== Discography ==
=== Albums ===
Year	Title	Peak	Weeks
2003	Jérémy Chatelain	19	17
2006	Variétés Françaises	107	2

=== Singles ===
Year	Single	Peak	Weeks
2003	"Laisse-moi"	10	13
2003	"Belle Histoire"	45	10
2003	"Vivre Ça"	40	13
2004	"J'aimerai"	55	6
2004	"Je M'en Fous"	*	–
2006	"Katmandou"	–	–
2006	"Variété Française"	–	–
2006	"J'veux Qu'on M'enterre"	–	–

* Promo Single Only

All peak positions on the France Top 200 Albums & Top 100 Singles Chart
