= Jeremy Chatelain (album) =

Jérémy Châtelain

Studio album by Jérémy Châtelain
- Released: October 28, 2003
- Recorded: 2003
- Genre: French Pop/Rock
- Label: Mercury/Universal

Jérémy Châtelain chronology
Jérémy Châtelain (2003)	Variétés Françaises (2006)

Jérémy Châtelain was the self-titled debut album by French musician Jérémy Châtelain. The album was released in October 2003. The album yielded 4 singles, including two Top 40 Hits.

== Track listing ==
1. Vivre Ça - 4:02
2. Parce Que Vous Le Faîtes - 3:28
3. C'est Ça Ma Vie - 3:17
4. J'aimerai - 2:45
5. Je M'envole - 3:23
6. Harold Et Maud (Featuring Freko) - 4:22
7. Je M'en Fous - 2:43
8. Amour.com - 3:11
9. Georgy - 3:52
10. Belle Histoire - 3:14
11. Porte Dauphine - 4:12
12. Laisse-moi - 3:46
13. Laisse-moi (Alternate version) [Hidden Track] - 3:35

== Charts ==
Chart (2003)	Peak position
France Top 200 Albums	19

== Singles ==
Single	Release
Laisse-moi	February 2003
Belle Histoire	July 2003
Vivre Ça	October 2003
J'aimerai	February 2004
Je M'en Fous	Promo only
