= National Identity Management Commission =

Nigerian National Identity Management Commission

Agency overview
- Formed: 2007
- Preceding agency: Directorate of National Civic Registration
- Jurisdiction: Federal Government of Nigeria
- Headquarters: 11, Sokode Crescent, off Dalaba Street, Zone 5, Wuse, Abuja, FCT
- Agency executive: Engr Abisoye Coker-Odusote, Ag. DG/CEO
- Website: www.nimc.gov.ng

National Identity Management Commission (NIMC) is a statutory Nigerian organization that operates the country's national identity management systems. It was established by the NIMC Act No. 23 of 2007 to create, operate and manage Nigeria's national identity card database, integrate the existing identity database in government institutions, register individuals and legal residents, assign a unique national identification number and introduce general multi-purpose cards.

== History ==
A national identity card system was initially conceived in 1977 but the project did not see the light of the day. In 2003, a new scheme managed by the Directorate of National Civic Registration (DNCR) was initiated and about 54 million Nigerians were registered, however, the scheme failed to meet official expectations and was also hampered by allegations of corruption and embezzlement of funds. The National Identity Management Commission came into effect in 2010 and an initial budget of about 30 billion naira was appropriated in the 2011 federal budget. The commission subsequently entered into an agreement with the National Database & Registration Authority of Pakistan to develop computerized national identity cards for Nigerians. The commission also partnered with two consortiums, the first led by Chams Nigeria and the second, OneSecureCard consortium composed of Interswitch, SecureID, and Iris Technologies to provide data capture services. In March 2024, the commission denied circulating reports of a data breach by a shadowy entity, XpressVerify.

== NIN ID number ==
The commission oversees the registration and distribution of the National Identification Number (NIN), issues National e-ID card s, conducts identity verification, and ensures the harmonization and authentication of user data. The national identification number is a part of Nigeria's National Identity Management System, the other part is the General Multi-Purpose Card. The number stores an individual's unique data into the database. It is part of a measure to create a national identity database and to prevent both double identity and identity fraud.

The NIMC self-service portal allows users to modify their National Identification Number (NIN) details online. This includes changes to date of birth, name, address, email, and phone number. The portal provides a secure and user-friendly process, requiring specific documents for each type of modification.

In July 2024, the offices of MTN, Glo and others were stormed nationwide by subscribers after the telecoms deactivated lines not linked with a NIN. One month later, the NCC announced a new 14 September 2024 deadline for individual linking of NINs to SIM cards.

== Identity card ==
The organization began enrollment exercise in September 2010 and started the issuance of a multipurpose card in 2013. The identity card issued in 2013 can be obtained by Nigerians aged sixteen or have lived in the country for two or more years at point of enrollment providing an identification document with a photograph such as a driver's license or an international passport. The ID card contains a National Identity Number, two photographs of the card holder, and a chip containing the biometric information of the holder. The commission also collaborated with MasterCard to add a prepaid element to the card and can be used as an ATM card in MasterCard certified ATMs.

The new General Multipurpose Card (GMPC) introduced by Nigeria's National Identity Management Commission (NIMC) integrates several functions into one platform, including payment and government services. It streamlines identity verification, replacing multiple forms of ID, and can be applied for online, at NIMC offices, or through banks.

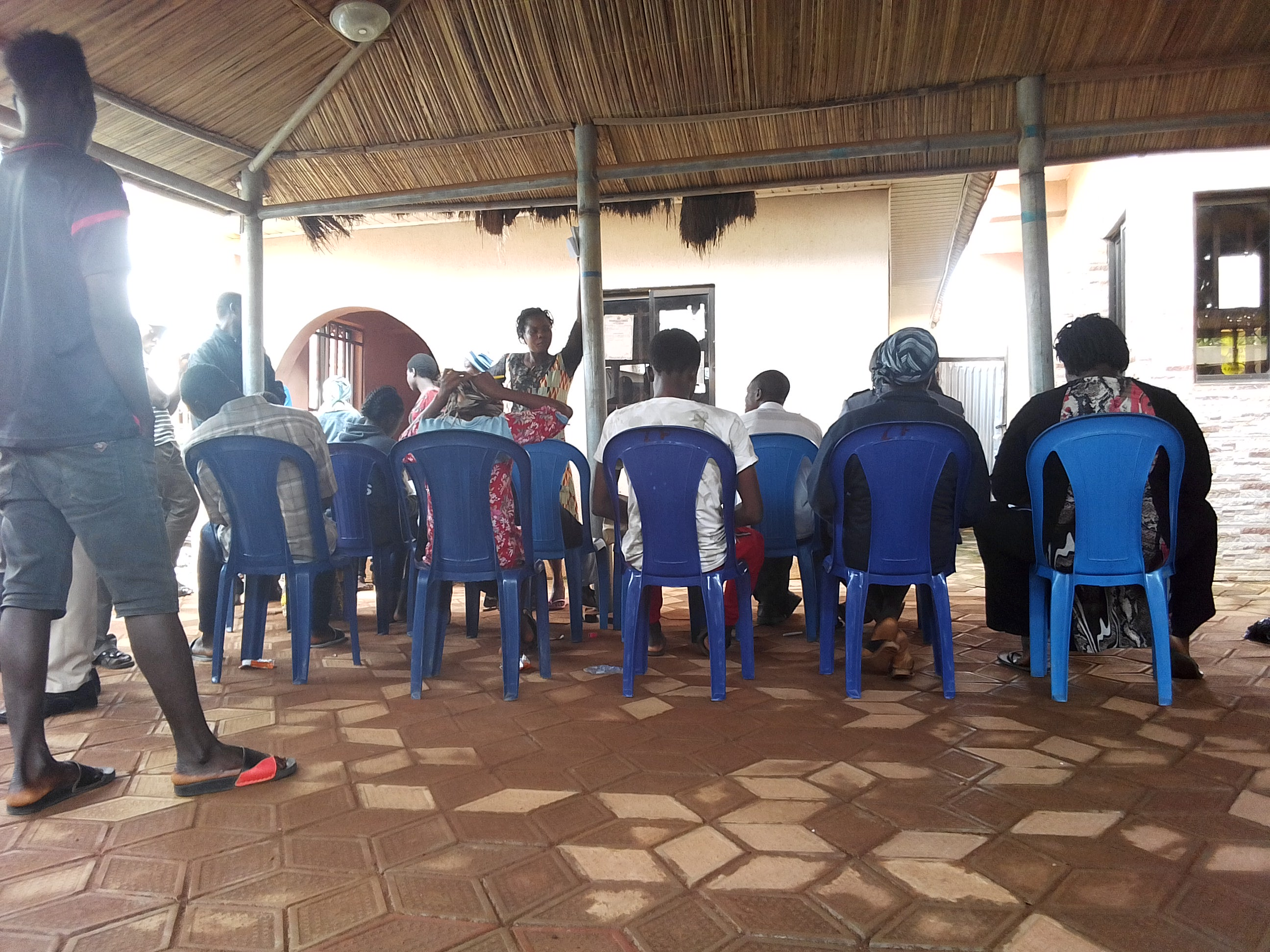
A registration centre at Sabon Tasha Kaduna, Nigeria for the registration of the national identity card carried out by the National Identity Management Commission NIMC

== See also ==
- National Data Protection Commission
