= Abuja Area Mama =

Nigerian cross dresser (1991–2024)

- Abuja Area Mama in 2024.
- Born: Ifeanyi Chukwu-Agah Benedict; 20 April 1991; Afikpo North, Ebonyi State, Nigeria
- Died: 8 August 2024 (aged 33)
- Cause of death: Beaten and stabbed
- Body discovered: Katampe-Mabushi Expressway, Federal Capital Territory, Nigeria
- Other names: Shantel Kay, Chantelle, Area Mama
- Occupations: Sex worker; LGBTQ activist
- Years active: 2006–2024

Ifeanyi Chukwu-Agah Benedict (20 April 1991 – 8 August 2024), predominantly known as Abuja Area Mama, was a Nigerian sex worker, social media personality, and an LGBTQ rights activist. She was murdered on 8 August 2024 and her case remains unsolved.

== Early life ==
Ifeanyi Chukwu-Agah Benedict was born in Afikpo North local government area of Ebonyi State, and raised in Gwagwa. At an early age, she took an interest in "cross-dressing", often dressing as a female and wearing make-up and wigs. Benedict became aware of her sexuality at the age of 10, considering herself to be gay. She disclosed that she had been sexually molested by unnamed adults who used vaseline to "massage her kpekus"; a Nigerian Pidgin term for female genitalia.

== Life and career ==
Benedict adopted the name Shantel Kay (sometimes spelled Chantelle). She began working as a hairdresser and make-up artist. She later relocated to Abuja. In 2006, she began taking on sex work for money and having sex with undisclosed clients, donning the title Abuja Area Mama. Her clients, which included elderly and retired men whose identities were never publicly disclosed, would pick her up at night. As she pursued sex work, Benedict was subject to multiple physical assaults, including a knife stabbing that was later documented on her social media video in September 2023. Despite reports to the local police, no investigations or arrest were ever made. Throughout 2024, Benedict began appearing on several TV shows and web-shows discussing her life, bringing awareness the dangers of prostitution and life on the streets. In March 2024, she expressed wanting to retire from the sex work industry and to find a husband to marry.

== Personal life ==
Despite being labeled as transgender by several media outlets, Benedict identified as a gay male who "cross dress"; an act where she would dress as a woman. She also identified using the pronouns she/her. In November 2023, she disclosed that her father had died.

== Death ==
On the night of 7 August 2024, Benedict uploaded a video on her TikTok showcasing her wearing make-up and a wig, dressed in a dark kimono. Benedict, who was in the back of a ride-hailing service vehicle, was on her way to meet with a client. The following morning on 8 August, Benedict's bloodied and beaten corpse was found along the Katampe-Mabushi Expressway in the Banex, Wuse 2 area of the Federal Capital Territory. Commissioner of Police FCT, CP Benneth C. Igweh had reportedly opened an investigation but Benedict's murder remains unsolved. Four days before her murder, Benedict shared a video via Instagram showing a hostile client who paid ₦200,000 naira in services and demanded their money back. She was laid to rest on 25 February 2025.

=== Remembrances and reactions ===
Abuja Area Mama's murder was reported by several international news media including BBC News, CNN, and PinkNews. Nigerian human rights group The Initiative For Equal Rights (TIERS) offered their condolences. An online petition, hosted by All Out, was started with the goal of reaching 10,000 signatures to be sent to the Nigeria Ministry of Justice. Nigerian journalist Martins Ifijeh referred to the murder as "the worst form of inhumanity".

On 5 August 2025, a Nigerian non-governmental human rights organization known as Minority Watch (Minority Advocates for Education and Equitable Access to Rights Initiative) filed a lawsuit in the Federal High Court of Nigeria against the Abuja division of the police force for failing to properly investigate the murder. Minority Watch, in collaboration with two other non-governmental organizations, submitted a formal petition to the Commissioner of Police, Federal Capital Territory (FCT), on 8 August 2024. A follow-up petition was also submitted on 12 February 2025. The group is seeking a declaration that the police inaction amounts to an additional violation of Benedict's right to life under Nigerian law. Furthermore, they are seeking an order of mandamus directing the police to immediately commence a thorough investigation into the murder, apprehend the perpetrators, and ensure they are prosecuted in accordance with the law.

== See also ==
- Bobrisky – Nigerian transgender woman (born 1991)
- Fola Francis – Nigerian transgender model (1994–2023)
- LGBTQ rights in Nigeria
