= Chatel =

Chatel or Châtel may refer to:

== Places ==
In France:

- Châtel, Haute-Savoie, in the Haute-Savoie department
- Châtel-Censoir, in the Yonne department
- Chatel-Chéhéry, in the Ardennes department
- Châtel-de-Joux, in the Jura department
- Châtel-de-Neuvre, in the Allier department
- Châtel-Gérard, in the Yonne department
- Châtel-Guyon, in the Puy-de-Dôme department
- Châtel-Montagne, in the Allier department
- Châtel-Moron, in the Saône-et-Loire department
- Châtel-Saint-Germain, in the Moselle department
- Châtel-sur-Moselle, in the Vosges department
- Le Châtel, in the Savoie department

In Switzerland:

- Châtel-Saint-Denis, in the canton of Fribourg
- Châtel-sur-Montsalvens, in the canton of Fribourg

== People with the surname ==
- Béatrice Chatel French physicist
- Claudine Chatel (born 1951), French-Canadian actress and author
- Jean Châtel, would-be assassin of King Henry IV of France
- Luc Chatel, French politician

== See also ==
- Chantel
- Chastel (disambiguation)
- Chattel, or personal property
