= Miss Sahhara =

Nigerian beauty queen and LGBTQ advocate

Miss saHHara
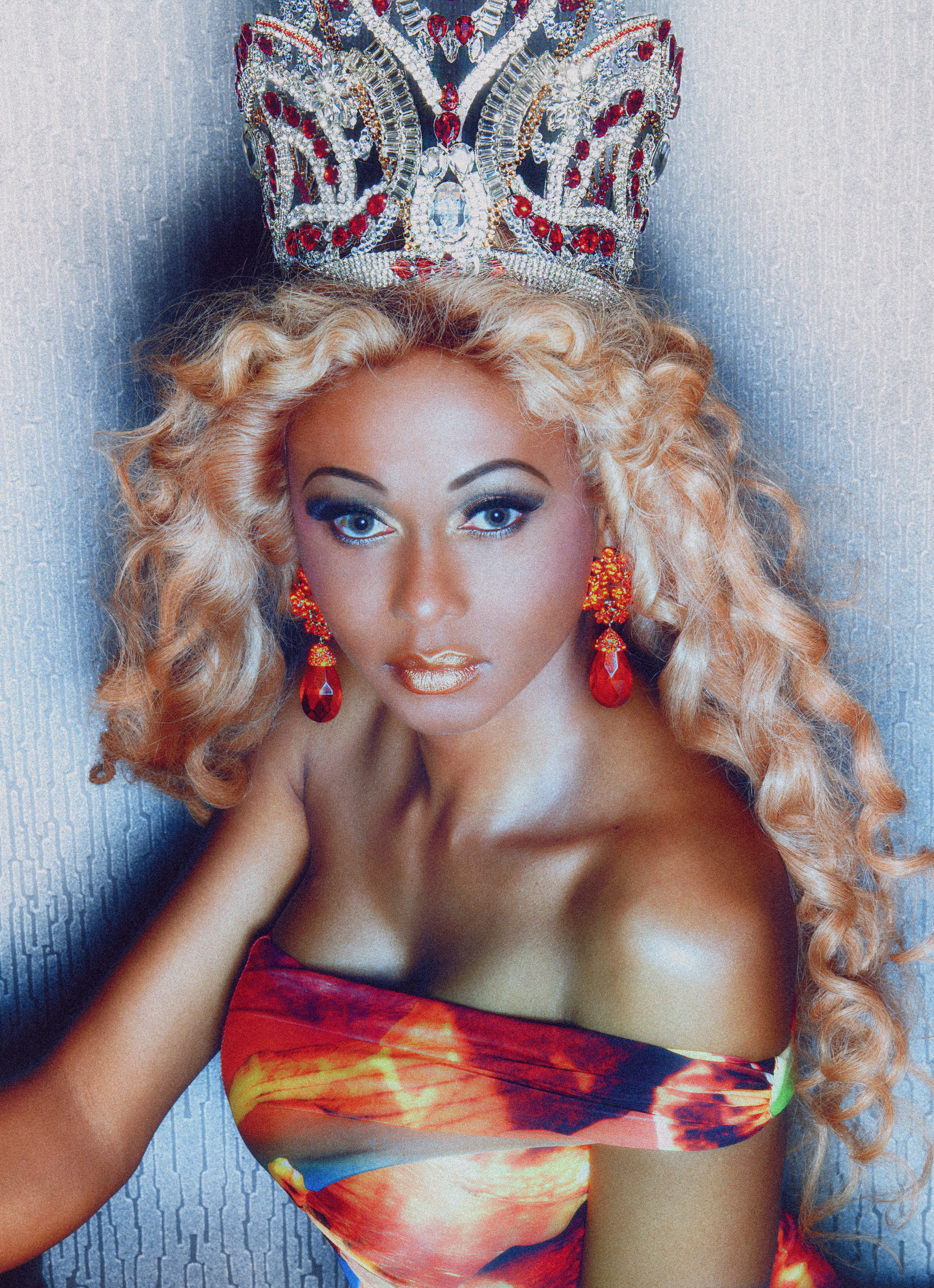
- Miss saHHara modeling in London
- Born: 27 August
- Occupations: Singer/songwriter, fashion model, beauty queen, Founder of Transvalid organisation, President of Miss Trans Global
- Height: 5 ft 11 in (180 cm)
- Title: Super Sireyna Worldwide 2014 (Winner); Miss International Queen 2011 (1st Runner-up); Miss Exlilio 2005 (Winner); Alt. Miss World 2004 (1st Runner-up)
- Website: misssahhara.com

Miss Sahhara (stylized as Miss saHHara) (Note: Miss Sahhara does not use her legal name online for safety reasons; some sources claim that it is "Iris Henson" or "Clifford Oche", but she has denied both.) is a British Nigerian beauty queen and an LGBTQ rights activist.

She is the first ever winner of Super Sireyna Worldwide 2014 in Manila, Philippines. She became the first black transgender woman to be crowned in an international transgender pageant. With her 2011 participation in Miss International Queen, a beauty pageant in Pattaya for transgender women, Miss Sahhara became the first trans woman from Nigeria to come out in the international press. She subsequently founded a global transgender awareness news curation organisation called TransValid, and an advocacy pageant for transgender women called Miss Trans Global.

== Biography ==
Miss Sahhara grew up in a small village in northern Nigeria. Her grandmother, who raised her while her mother was away at university, supported her in expressing her gender identity, but her neighbors and other family members were less supportive. As a teenager who wanted to wear makeup, dresses, and high heels, she was bullied at home and in public for her gender expression, suffering physical and sexual assault, harassment, and death threats. Her uncles beat her, and her church told her she was possessed by evil spirits.

After two suicide attempts as a teenager, and being imprisoned for her gender presentation in January 2004, Miss Sahhara resolved to either leave Nigeria or kill herself. Later in 2004, she immigrated to London, where she was able to meet other transgender women, access gender-affirming care, and live openly as a woman.

Miss Sahhara graduated with a Master's degree in digital media from London Metropolitan University in 2011.

== Pageants and modeling ==
Miss Sahhara has participated in a number of pageants in the UK and abroad, representing her birth country of Nigeria to draw attention to the plight of the African LGBT community. She is also the founder and executive producer of transgender advocacy pageants Queen of Nations and Miss Trans Global.

Title	Year	Placement	Country	Source
Super Sireyna Worldwide	2014	Winner	Philippines	
Miss International Queen	2011	1st Runner-up	Thailand	
Andrew Logan's Alternative Miss World	2009	1st Runner-up	United Kingdom	

Miss Sahhara has appeared on the covers of transgender magazines Mask and TransLiving, and modeled for Ziad Ghanem on the London Fashion Week catwalk, as well as performing at Madam Jojo's Kitsch Cabaret in Soho before its 2014 closure.

== Charity and advocacy ==
Miss Sahhara has been a vocal critic of the 2014 Nigerian Same Sex Marriage Prohibition Act, which imposes prison terms of up to 14 years on LGBT Nigerians.

In 2014, Miss Sahhara founded TransValid, a global awareness organization for the transgender community. Her activities with TransValid have included a 2015 short film, The Deadly Price of Transphobia in Brazil, and a 2016 campaign titled 'I am Trans and I have the Right to Life' .

Miss Sahhara has discussed transgender rights on Sky Living's "Lady Boys", Eat Bulaga!'s "Super Sireyna Worldwide", BBC's "In Her Shoes: #BBCIdentity", and a Tunay Na Buhay interview with Rhea Santos.

== Notes ==
Awards and achievements
Preceded by (Japan) Ami Takeuchi	1st Runner-up Miss International Queen; 2010	Succeeded by (Brazil) Jessika Simões
