= LGBTQ people in Nigeria =

Lesbian, gay, bisexual, transgender, and queer (LGBTQ) people in Nigeria face significant challenges. LGBTQ rights in Nigeria are denied by law, with even more severe limitations on LGBTQ rights in Northern Nigeria. However, the LGBTQ community, estimated at 15 to 20 million people, continues to maintain an underground culture, especially in Southern Nigeria.

== Demographics ==
Estimates of the homosexual population in the country have ranged from fifteen to twenty million. Studies have found that the majority of LGBTQ Nigerians identify as Christian, in denominations such as Anglicanism.

== Rights ==
Same-sex sexual activity is criminalized throughout Nigeria under various laws, including federal and state codes. Punishments range from imprisonment to capital punishment in some northern states governed by Shari'a law.

=== Federal laws ===
- In southern Nigeria, the Criminal Code criminalizes sex acts between men with penalties up to 14 years' imprisonment. Gross indecency between men is punishable by up to 3 years in prison.
- In northern Nigeria, the Penal Code prohibits "carnal intercourse against the order of nature" for men and women, punishable by up to 14 years' imprisonment, a fine, or both.

=== Shari'a in Northern States ===
- Twelve northern states implement Shari'a-based criminal laws applying to Muslims and those who consent to Shari'a court jurisdiction.
- Sodomy and lesbianism are severely punished, with penalties ranging from 100 lashes to death by stoning, depending on marital status and location.
- Lesbianism is defined as carnal acts or stimulation between women, punishable by imprisonment or caning in most states, with death penalties applied in Kano and Katsina.
- Cross-dressing and "imitating the opposite gender" are penalized in some states. For example, Kano imposes up to one year in prison or a fine for men who dress or behave as women.
- Being labeled a "vagabond" or "incorrigible vagabond" for engaging in same-sex acts or cross-dressing carries punishments of imprisonment, caning, or fines.

== History ==
=== Early history ===
In pre-Islamic Hausa culture, in areas now including northern Nigeria, ƴan daudu were men with feminine attributes.

=== 1970s ===
LGBTQ organizing in Nigeria dates back to at least the 1970s. Until 1999, when military rule in Nigeria ended, LGBTQ organizing did not focus on political rights, due to more widespread restrictions on political organizing and activity.

The first Nigerian branch of the LGBTQ-affirming Metropolitan Community Church was founded in 1974 in Imo State. In 1976, the congregation's first minister, Methodist Sylvanus Maduka, was the first non-white minister ordained in the MCC. It is unclear how many of the church's members, if any, were gay or lesbian, but congregation leadership did publish in support of LGBTQ rights.

Also during the 1970s, Area Scatter was a cross-dressing performer and musician in Eastern Nigeria.

=== 1980s-1990s ===
In 1989, the Nigerian Gentlemen Alliance was founded in Lagos. The gay men's social club aimed to provide HIV-prevention education, and worked to support the LGBTQ Nigerian diaspora in the United Kingdom. Its formal meetings saw limited attendance, but its parties saw higher attendance, with a 1991 event having up to 1,500 attendees. Beyond Lagos, the organization founded multiple state branches, including in Kaduna, with meetings in Zaria.

The return to democratic rule in Nigeria in 1999 also brought about a number of organizations seeking to address to HIV/AIDS crisis and provide healthcare. Alliance Rights Nigeria, founded in 1999, held private meetings for its gay members and organized public lectures "focused on AIDS, STDs, and safe sex".

=== 2000s ===
In 2004, the Alliance Rights Nigeria programs director, Bisi Alimi, came out publicly on the popular NTA talk show New Dawn with Funmi. By May 2004, Alliance Rights Nigeria was the only LGBTQ organization in the country "with a public presence". The group later partnered with the Nigerian Ministry of Health in 2007, on the HIV/STI Integrated Biological and Behavioural Surveillance Survey (IBBSS).

The early 2000s also saw LGBTQ religious groups, such as Changing Attitude Nigeria, founded by Davis Mac-Iyalla in 2005, and the MCC-affiliated House of Rainbow, founded by Jide Macaulay in 2006. A daughter organization of House of Rainbow, Daughters of Jezebel, worked to support lesbians.

By the mid-2000s, groups were beginning to organize in support of LGBTQ rights, such as the Coalition for the Defense of Sexual Rights in Nigeria (founded 2005) and The Initiative For Equal Rights. This more public organizing exposed activists to outbursts of homophobic violence and being outed in the Nigerian press. From the mid-2000s onward, activists also have increasingly utilized social media to politically organize.

== Culture ==
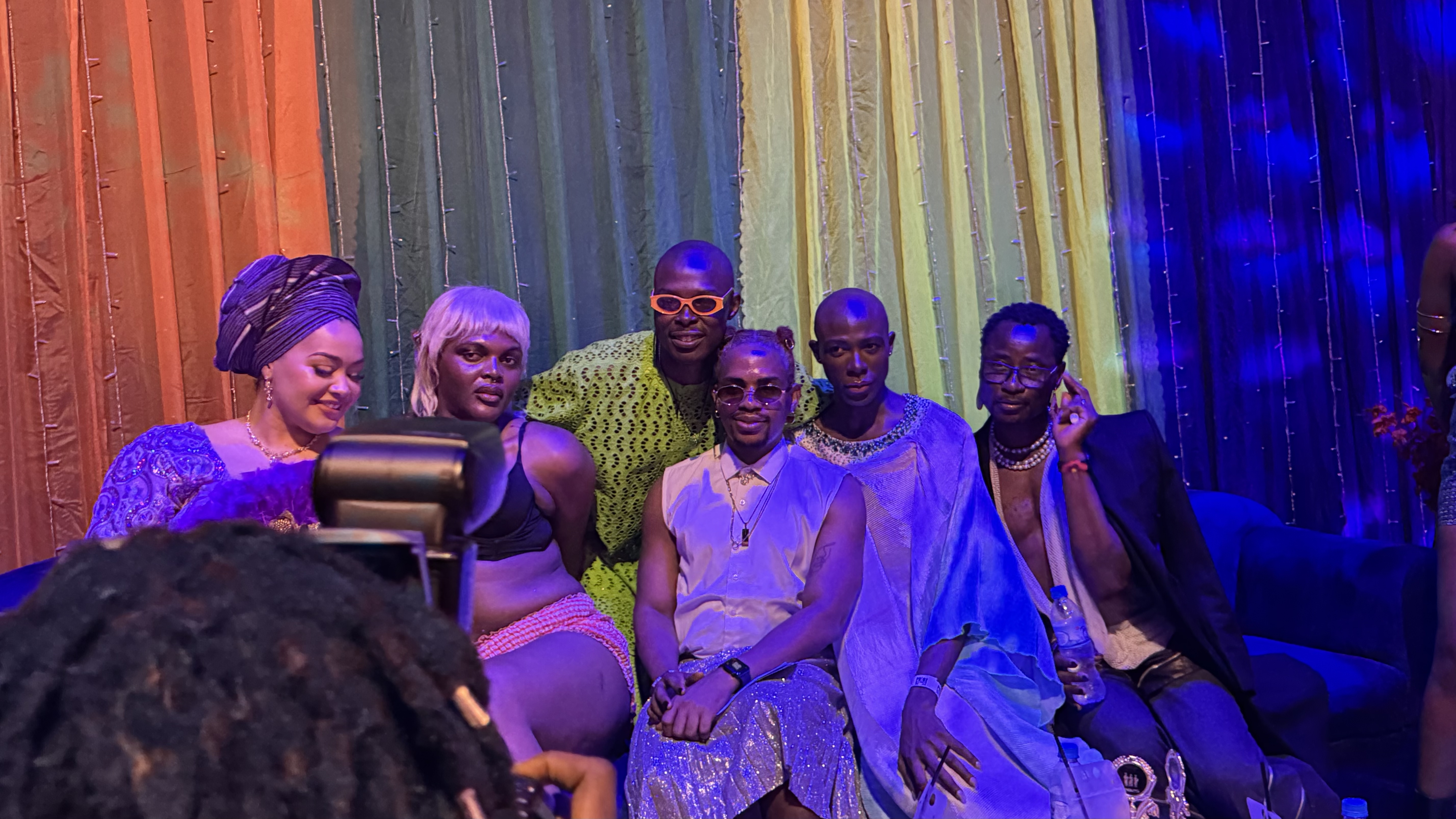
Pride in Lagos in 2025

Many LGBTQ Nigerians use the label 'queer', due to the legal repercussions of being deemed gay or lesbian.

Despite repressive laws and public attitudes, an underground LGBTQ culture does exist, especially in Lagos and its suburbs. Many LGBTQ Lagos residents found an inclusive space in Lagos Fashion Week, which embraced gender non-conforming styles and models, although the event has been under pressure for years to dampen this attitude. Some more inclusive brands have chosen to hold private showings of their collections.

The city has been home to a ballroom scene since the early 2000s; to protect attendees, event details are released only shortly beforehand. LGBTQ party organizers may partner with private security firms to ensure partygoers' safety. Pride in Lagos, an annual event held since 2021, includes ballroom performances.

Many LGBTQ Nigerians use social media to connect and to share their experiences and opinions.

=== Media ===
LGBTQ+ representation in Nigerian media has often been limited due to discriminatory laws and societal stigma. During the early 2000s, films often ignored queer experiences or depicted same-sex relationships as negative, resulting in poor consequences. Online spaces became a way for creators to bypass institutional restrictions and portray a broader range of LGBTQ+ stories, including via web series, written publications, and independent films.

Authors in the Nigerian diaspora have also written queer literature set in Nigeria, and in general, African queer memoir and fiction has grown throughout the 2000s. Notable recent works by authors in the Nigerian diaspora include Chris Abani's GraceLand, Chinelo Okparanta's Under the Udala Trees and Akwaeke Emezi's Freshwater.

In 2020, Ìfé, by Pamela Adie and Uyaiedu Ikpe-Etim, was released as the first Nigerian movie to portray lesbian relationships positively. It was blocked from showing in cinemas by the National Film Video Censors Board. Other recent media to showcase nuanced LGBTQ+ characters includes 14 Years and a Day, Ixora, and Wura.

==== Nonfiction books ====
- Lives of Great Men: Living and Loving as an African Gay Man (2017) by Chike Frankie Edozien
- Blessed Body (2016) by Unoma Azuah
- She Called Me Woman: Nigeria's Queer Women Speak (2018), collection of interviews with 25 Nigerian lesbians
- Embracing My Shadow (2021) by Unoma Azuah, country's first lesbian memoir
- Dear Senthuran (2021) by Akwaeke Emezi, a trans non-binary memoir
- Love Offers No Safety (2024) by Olumide Makanjuola and Jude Dibia

==== Novels ====
- Walking with Shadows (2005) by Jude Dibia
- Under the Udala Trees (2015) by Chinelo Okparanta
- Fimí Sílẹ̀ Forever (2017) by Nnanna Ikpo
- When We Speak of Nothing (2017) by Olúmìdé Pópóọlá
- Speak no Evil (2018) by Uzodinma Iweala
- Freshwater (2018) by Akwaeke Emezi
- Pet (2019) by Akwaeke Emezi
- The Death of Vivek Oji (2020) by Akwaeke Emezi
- Ace of Spades (2021) by Faridah Àbíké-Íyímídé
- Vagabonds! (2022) by Eloghosa Osunde
- And Then He Sang a Lullaby (2023) by Ani Kayode Somtochukwu
- Blessings (2024) by Chukwuebuka Ibeh
- Necessary Fiction (2025) by Eloghosa Osunde

==== Poetry ====
- 14: An Anthology of Queer Art | Vol. 1: We are Flowers), Vol. 2: The Inward Gaze (2017 & 2018) by Brittlepaper.
- Mounting the Moon: Queer Nigerian Love Poems (2018), curated by Unoma Azuah and Michelle Omas
- Sacrament of Bodies (2021) by Romeo Oriogun
- Nomad (2022) by Romeo Oriogun
- Content Warning: Everything (2022) by Akwaeke Emezi
- The Gathering of Bastards (2023) by Romeo Oriogun

==== Films ====
- We Don't Live Here Anymore (2018), drama film directed by Tope Oshin and sponsored by The Initiative For Equal Rights
- Under the Rainbow (2018), documentary film by Pamela Adie
- Walking with Shadows (2019), adaptation of novel
- Ìfé (2020), short film by Pamela Adie
- The Legend of the Underground (2021), American documentary film
- Country Love (2022), a gay short film by Wapah Kelechi Ezeigwe
- All the Colours of the World Are Between Black and White (2023), romantic drama film
- 14 Years And a Day (2023), romantic drama film by Uyaiedu Ikpe-Etim and Ayo Lawson
- Shall We Meet Tonight (2025), lesbian short film by Bisi Alimi and Lanre Njoku

==== Magazines ====
- A Nasty Boy, fashion magazine founded in 2017
- Minority Africa, an African literary Magazine

==== Anthologies ====
- Feel Good, an anthology of short stories written by queer Nigerian storytellers (2023)

== Societal views ==
Pentecostal leaders within Nigeria tend to "vehemently preach against homosexuality".

Schools and universities in Nigeria tend to promote compulsory heterosexuality. LGBTQ students often face "rejection, bullying, and victimization" from both family members and school authorities, with some being expelled from schools and universities. Studies have also found negative attitude towards the LGBTQ community among newspapers, librarians, and social workers in Nigeria.

Some organizations in Nigeria try to assist LGBTQ persons, such as the Metropolitan Community Church. Affiliation with these groups may place individuals at risk of violence or abuse.

== Asylum seekers ==
The enforcement of Nigeria’s Same-Sex Marriage Prohibition Act has not only criminalized same-sex unions but also prohibited LGBTQ advocacy, gatherings, and public expressions of affection. This legislation has forced many LGBTQ Nigerians to seek asylum abroad, including in the United States. Asylum seekers often cite fears of violence, ostracism, and legal repercussions under both secular and Shari'a laws. Activists have also highlighted the significant health and economic consequences of the law, as it hampers access to HIV prevention services and forces LGBTQ individuals and allies to abandon their work in community health and education.

Organizations such as Housing Works in Brooklyn provide vital support for LGBTQ asylum seekers from Nigeria, assisting with legal representation, housing, and access to medical care. Asylum seekers face challenges even after fleeing Nigeria, including the trauma of displacement, societal stigma, and concern for family members who remain at risk back home. For some, the opportunity to live openly is tempered by ongoing fears of being targeted or exposing their loved ones to harm.
