= List of LGBTQ Black films, documentaries, and web/TV series =

This article lists Black queer, lesbian, gay, bisexual, non-binary, polyamory, or transgender-related films. The list includes movies, documentaries, and TV/web series that deal with or feature significant Black queer characters or issues as an important plot device. The English-language film title, original title, country of origin and production year are listed.

== Movies ==
Title	Country	Year	Ref.
All the Colours of the World Are Between Black and White	Nigeria	2023	
Anything's Possible	United States	2022	
As I Am	United States	2019	
Blackbird	United States	2014	
Black Aura on an Angel	United States	2004	
Being 17 (Quand on a 17 ans)	France	2016	
Bessie	United States	2015	
Blind Faith	United States	1998	
Braids on a Bald Head	Nigeria	2010	
Brother	Canada	2022	
Brother to Brother	United States	2004	
Brooklyn’s Bridge to Jordan	United States	2005	
bwoy	United States, Jamaica	2016	
Change	United States	2011	
Children of God	Bahamas	2010	
The Color Purple	United States	1985	
The Color Purple	United States	2023	
Country Love	Nigeria	2022	
Dakan	Guinea	1997	
Dear White People	United States	2014	
Dirty Laundry	United States	2006	
Everything Will Be Fine (Alles Wird Gut)	Germany	1998	
Family	United States	2008	
Finding Me	United States	2009	
Friend of the World	United States	2020	
From Zero to I Love You	United States	2019	
Get on the Bus	United States	1996	
A Girl Like Grace	United States	2015	
God Loves Uganda	United States	2013	
Green Book	United States	2018	
Gun Hill Road	United States	2011	
The Happy Sad	United States	2013	
Hearts Beat Loud	United States	2013	
Hell or High Water	Nigeria	2017	
Henry Gamble's Birthday Party	United States	2015	
Holiday Heart	United States	2000	
I Don't Know Who You Are	Canada	2023	
Ìfé	Nigeria	2020	
Karmen Geï	Senegal, Canada, France	2001	
KickOff	United Kingdom	2011	
Kinky Boots	United Kingdom	2005	
Looking for Langston	United Kingdom	1989	
Lost In The World	South Africa	2015	
Madame Sata	Brazil	2002	
Mississippi Damned	United States	2009	
Moonlight	United States	2016	
Naz & Maalik	United States	2015	
Noah's Arc: Jumping the Broom	United States	2008	
Parallel Sons	United States	1995	
Pariah	United States	2011	
Play the Devil	Trinidad and Tobago	2018	
Punks	United States	2001	
Rag Tag	United Kingdom, Nigeria	2018	
Rafiki	Kenya	2018	
The Reception	United States	2005	
Reluctantly Queer	Ghana	2016	
Rent	United States	2005	
Rivers Wash Over Me	United States	2009	
Rude	Canada	1995	
Rustin	United States	2023	
Sarang Song	United States	2006	
Saturday Church	United States	2017	
Savage Roses: Locas 4 Life	United States	2002	
Set It Off	United States	1996	
She Hate Me	United States	2004	
Single Man Problems	United States	2023	
The Skinny	United States	2012	
Slow	United States	2011	
Starrbooty	United States	2007	
Stories of Our Lives	Kenya	2014	
Strange Fruit	United States	2004	
Stud Life	United States	2012	
Tangerine	United States	2015	
Tchindas	Spain, Cape Verde	2015	
The Things You Think I'm Thinking	Canada	2017	
Walking with Shadows	Nigeria	2019	
We Don't Live Here Anymore	Nigeria	2018	
While You Weren't Looking	South Africa	2015	
To Wong Foo, Thanks for Everything, Julie Newmar	United States	1995	
The Watermelon Woman	United States	1996	
The Women of Brewster Place	United States	1989	
The Wound	South Africa	2017	
Young Soul Rebels	United Kingdom	1991	

== Documentaries ==
Title	Country	Year	Ref.
The Abominable Crime	Jamaica	2013	
The Aggressives	United States	2005	
All God’s Children	United States	1996	
The Art of Sin	Norway, Sudan	2020	
Black is... Black Ain't	United States	1995	
Black Nations/Queer Nations?	United States	1995	
Black./Womyn: Conversations with Lesbians of African Descent	United States	2008	
Born in Flames	United States	1983	
Brother Outsider: The Life of Bayard Rustin	United States	2002	
Butch Mystique	United States	2003	
Call Me Kuchu	Uganda	2012	
Check It	United States	2016	
Coming out of the Nkuta	Cameroon	2011	
The Death and Life of Marsha P Johnson	United States	2017	
Defiance: Voices of a New Generation	Nigeria	2020	
Difficult Love	South Africa	2010	
Dream Deferred: The Sakia Gunn Film Project	United States	2008	
The Edge of Each Other's Battles: The Vision of Audre Lorde	United States	2002	
Forbidden Games: The Justin Fashanu Story	United Kingdom	2017	
Game Face	United States	2015	
Game Girls	United States	2019	
How Do I Look	United States	2006	
I Am Not Your Negro	United States	2016	
Jumpin’ the Broom: The New Covenant	United States	2006	
Kiki	United States	2016	
The Legend of the Underground	United States	2021	
Leilani's Fortune	Canada	2023	
Lil Nas X: Long Live Montero	United States	2023	
The New Black	United States	2013	
My Mama Said Yo Mama's a Dyke	United States	2010	
Paris is Burning	United States	1990	
Passing	Canada	2015	
The Pearl of Africa	Sweden, Thailand, Kenya Uganda	2016	
Pick Up the Mic	United States	2006	
Portrait of Jason	United States	1967	
Someone Like Me	Canada	2021	
Still Black: A Portrait of Black Transmen	United States	2008	
Tchindas	Spain, Cape Verde	2015	
Tongues Untied	United States	1989	
Treasure: From Tragedy to Trans Justice Mapping a Detroit Story	United States	2015	
U People	United States	2009	
White Shadows	United States	2007	
You Are Not Alone	United States	2012	
Veil of Silence	Nigeria	2013	
Voguing: The Message	United States	1989	
Woubi Cheri	France, Ivory Coast	1998	

== Web/TV Series ==
Title	Country	Year	Ref.
Between Women	United States	2011	
Behind Closed Doors	United States	2017	
Black Lightning	United States	2018	
Blackville	United States	2017	
The Blues Blues	United States	2014	
Bois	United States	2013	
Brooklyn Nine-Nine	United States	2013	
Brown Girls	United States	2017	
Change the Sheets	United States	2016	
Come Take a Walk With Me	United States	2012	
Conframa	United States	2018	
Crazy Sexy Cool	United States	2014	
Dear White People	United States	2017	
District Heat	United States	2014	
The DL Chronicles	United States	2007	
Dyke Central	United States	2015	
Entangled With You	United States	2013	
Euphoria	United States	2019	
Femme	United States	2015	
Girl Play	United States	2012	
Girls Just Don't Do That	United States	2016	
Hollywood	United States	2020	
How To Get Away With Murder	United States	2014	
If I was your girl	United States	2012	
The Industry	United States	2013	
Interview with the Vampire	United States	2022	
It's Complicated	United States	2016	
Ladies, Lust, Love	United States	2012	
Let's Talk Lesbian	United States	2013	
Lez-B-Honest	United States	2011	
Lipstick: The Series	United States	2015	
Livin' It Up''	United States	2015	
Lovers & Friends	United States	2008	
Love, Lives, and Lesbians of Mobile	United States	2013	
Love and Lesbians NY	United States	2015	
Love of the Hustle	United States	2014	
LesBiReal	United States	2016	
The Lez Factor	United States	2013	
Master of None	United States	2015	
Momma'z Boi	United States	2013	
Noah’s Arc	United States	2005	
No Shade	United States	2015	
NYGTV	United States	2014	
Oops	United States	2011	
Pandora's Box	United States	2015	
The Peculiar Kind	United States	2012	
POSE	United States	2018	
P-Valley	United States	2020	
Queen Sugar	United States	2016	
Refracted Reflections	United States	2013	
Sex Education	United Kingdom	2019	
She's Gotta Have It	United States	2018	
Social Theory	United States	2013	
Skye's The Limit	United States	2013	
StudvilleTV	United States	2012	
Sunny Reign	United States	2012	
The SideLine	United States	2014	
T.R.A.D.E. IT ALL	United States	2014	
Triangle	United States	2014	
TysonPlus' I CanTell You Anything	United States	2021	
TysonPlus' The Scars Our Parents Leave	United States	2021	
TysonPlus' Boys Hurt Too	United States	2021	
TysonPlus' My Relationship with Death	United States	2021	
Unclassified The Series	United States	2017	
Woman of Atlanta TV	United States	2016	

== See also ==
- Black gay pride
- Black lesbian literature
- LGBT rights in Africa
- African-American LGBT community
- Media and LGBT youth of colour in the United States
- Timeline of African and diasporic LGBT history
