= Tom Noyes =

American fiction writer and academic

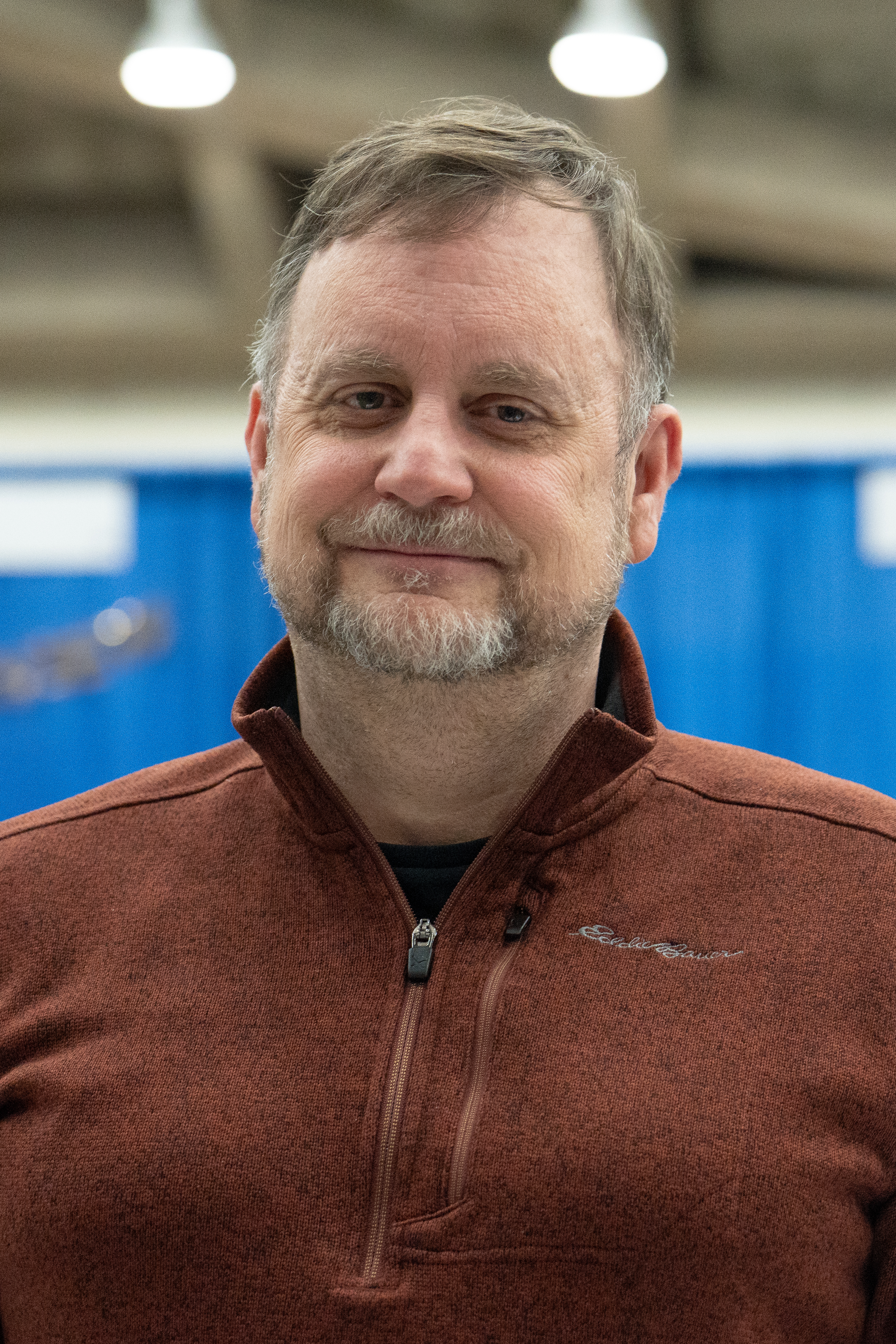
Noyes at AWP 2026

Tom Noyes is an American fiction writer and academic. He is the author of one novel and three collections of short fiction.

== Biography ==
Noyes is a distant relative of John Humphrey Noyes, the nineteenth-century founder of the Oneida Community. He was born near Philadelphia, and raised in upstate New York.

He earned a B.A. from Houghton College, an M.F.A. from Wichita State University, and a Ph.D. from Ohio University. In his early career, he taught creative writing at Indiana State University and at Concordia College. As of 2013, he teaches at Penn State Behrend in Erie, Pennsylvania.

His fiction has appeared in various literary journals, including the American Literary Review, Colorado Review, Georgia Review, Image, Kenyon Review, Mid-American Review, New Ohio Review, Sycamore Review, and West Branch. He has also served in various editorial roles at the journals Ascent, Quarter After Eight, and Lake Effect.

== Works ==
=== Behold Faith and Other Stories (2002) ===
Noyes's debut short story collection, Behold Faith and Other Stories, was published by Dufour Editions in 2002. It was shortlisted for Stanford Libraries' William Saroyan Prize and was reviewed in the New York Times Book Review. It also received a starred review in Kirkus Reviews, which described the collection as distilling "to a startling, lyrical essence the lot of plain folks".

=== Spooky Action at a Distance and Other Stories (2008) ===
Noyes's second story collection, Spooky Action at a Distance and Other Stories, was published by Dufour Editions in 2008. It was a finalist for the Bread Loaf Prize, the Flannery O'Connor Award for Short Fiction, the Grace Paley Prize in Short Fiction, and the Richard Sullivan Prize.

=== Come by Here: A Novella and Stories (2014) ===
Noyes's third collection, Come by Here: A Novella and Stories, was published by Autumn House Press in 2014 after winning the 2013 Autumn House Fiction Prize, selected by Kathleen George. The collection also won the Independent Press Awards' Gold Medal in Short Fiction. The stories are set in and around the Great Lakes region and engage real-life environmental controversies, including the Love Canal neighborhood of Niagara Falls, New York, the 2010 Kalamazoo River oil spill, and the underground mine fire in Centralia, Pennsylvania.

Reviewing the collection for Necessary Fiction, Jackie Thomas-Kennedy noted that Noyes is "fascinated by the way humans interact with and damage the earth" and that his prose "reaches its cleanest, most chilling peaks when disagreements arise between unrelated men".

=== The Substance of Things Hoped For: A Novel (2021) ===
Noyes's debut novel, The Substance of Things Hoped For, was published by Slant Books in April 2021. The book draws on Noyes's distant family connection to John Humphrey Noyes and imagines the historical period during which would-be presidential assassin Charles Guiteau was briefly a member of the Oneida Community's Perfectionist commune in upstate New York. The novel follows parallel narratives of John Humphrey Noyes and Guiteau, set against a background of family members, rivals, and other historical figures.

Writing for the Los Angeles Review of Books, W. Scott Olsen described the novel as "multi-voiced and multi-layered" and praised it as a book "about the ways people of earnest but flawed conviction construct their worlds". In Mere Orthodoxy, critic Katy Carl read the novel as a cautionary study in religious authority and communal life, arguing that through the character of John Humphrey Noyes the book illuminates the lure and the logical harm of unchecked utopian impulses, and that it brings readers "alive again to the necessity of humility, charity, and genuine maturity".

== Bibliography ==
=== Books ===
- Behold Faith and Other Stories (Dufour Editions, 2002)
- Spooky Action at a Distance and Other Stories (Dufour Editions, 2008)
- Come by Here: A Novella and Stories (Autumn House Press, 2014)
- The Substance of Things Hoped For: A Novel (Slant Books, 2021)
