= Arit Okpo =

Nigerian journalist

- Born: 1986 (age 39–40); Lagos, Nigeria
- Citizenship: Nigerian
- Education: Biochemistry
- Alma mater: University of calabar
- Occupations: Journalist, Television host, voice actor
- Employer: CNN International
- Notable work: Jesse: The Funeral That Never Ended (2019)

Arit Okpo is a Nigerian journalist and television host. Okpo was the host of CNN International's African Voices Changemakers and a former presenter/producer at EbonyLife TV.

Arit is a professional media specialist and an LGBT ally.

== Early life ==
Arit Okpo (born 1986) is a Nigerian journalist, voice actor, and television host. She studied Biochemistry at the university level and began her career with an academic background in the sciences before transitioning into media and journalism.

== Career ==
Okpo previously worked as a school director in 2013 and later became the creative director of Menoword Media. At EbonyLifeTv, she produced and presented EL Reports (which later became The Crunch), Chefrican and Naija Politics. n 2017, she was announced as a host of The Initiative for Equal Rights' podcast, Untold Facts. In 2019, she dedicated an episode of the podcast to discussing the queer memoir anthology She Called Me Woman.

She is currently on ISDAO's decision-making panel.

== CNN ==
Okpo was announced the new host of CNN African Voices. A CNN International television programme that beams lights on African entertainers, creatives, athletes, and other individuals making a difference in Africa or globally. African Voices is sponsored by Globacom.

== Filmography ==
- Jesse: The Funeral That Never Ended (2019)

== See also ==
IMDb
