= Ragtag =

Ragtag may refer to:

- Ragtag Cinema, a non-profit independent movie theater
- Ragtag Productions, an independent film company
- "Ragtag" (Agents of S.H.I.E.L.D.), a 2014 episode of American television series Agents of S.H.I.E.L.D.
- Project Ragtag, a cancelled Star Wars video game

== See also ==
- Rag tag
