= Emmanuella David-Ette =

Nigerian intersex activist

- Born: 1995/96
- Other name: Mystique Evolving
- Education: University of Ibadan (BSc)
- Organization(s): Dynamic Initiative for Healthcare & Human Rights
- Known for: Trans and Intersex activism
- Awards: WPATH Harry Benjamin Distinguished Advocacy Award, 2024
- Honours: Africa’s 100 Most Inspiring Women; 2022 – Leading Ladies Africa

Emmanuella David-Ette (also known as Mystique Evolving) is a Nigerian executive, and human rights, feminist trans and intersex activist. She (Note: David-ette uses both she/her and they/them pronouns. This article uses she/her for consistency.) is the founder and the Executive Program Coordinator of the first trans and intersex organization in Nigeria – the Dynamic Initiative for Healthcare & Human Rights (DIHHR).

== Personal life ==
David-ette uses she/her/they pronouns. David-ette is intersex. She also goes publicly by the name "Mystique Evolving."

She is the oldest child in her family and the only daughter. Assigned male at birth, she realized something about her was different when she reached puberty and began ovulating; she said she did not fit into "society's definition of gender, of sex." They withdrew from their family and people around them as they didn't understand what was happening. They discovered they were intersex while at the University of Ibadan via a hormonal profile and laparoscopy.

When David-ette came out to her family, they beat her, "cut her hair and drag her for floor" and she "almost die[d]."

David-ette got married in 2021. However, David-ette experienced domestic violence and later divorced.

After David-ette came out as intersex publicly, they told the BBC Pidgin that "a lot of pipo reach me, some bin encourage, a lot of pipo bin dey say dem no believe say we (intersex) dey for Nigeria, some wan find out more. Actually, pipo begin to propose. And dat part surprise me." After publicly coming out, David-ette said that their relationship with their family is beginning to settle and, as time passes, they may be on better terms.

== Education ==
David-ette has a Bachelor of Science in Archive & Information Science from the University of Ibadan. She is also a certified Psychosocial Therapist.

== Career ==
In 2013, David-ette founded TransNigeria, a Facebook group for trans, intersex, and gender non-conforming people in Nigeria. Five years later, the group was registered as a non-profit. In 2019, the charity was renamed to the Dynamic Initiative for Healthcare & Human Rights. David-ette currently serves as the Executive Program Coordinator DIHHR. DIHHR focuses on

1. trans and intersex rights advocacy,
2. combatting transphobia, interphobia, homophobia, and discrimination based on gender identity, expression, or sexual orientation,
3. trans and intersex healthcare access,
4. vocational training and internship opportunities for trans and intersex people,
5. trans / intersex safe house,
6. psychosocial and support services, and
7. trans, intersex, and gender non-conforming education and visibility.

DIHHR is a grantee partner of the Astraea Lesbian Foundation for Justice. DIHHR has also been a grantee partner of the International Trans Fund. In 2024, DIHHR was an author of the joint submission to the Universal Periodic Review of Nigeria along with the Sexual Rights Initiative, The PACT, Community Health Initiative for Youths in Nigeria, the International Centre for Total Health and Rights Advocacy Empowerment, Olive Right to Health Initiative, McClifford Initiative for Equal Access to HealthCare and Human, and Creme de la Creme House of Fame Foundation. DIHHR collaborated on The Initiative for Equal Rights (TIERs)'s 2024 Human Rights Violations Report: Based on Real or Perceived Sexual Orientation, Gender Identity/Expression and Sex Characteristics (Sogiesc) in Nigeria.

David-ette was named one of Africa's 100 Most Inspiring Women by Leading Ladies Africa in 2022. David-ette is on the Steering Committee of the international trans human rights-based healthcare organization, the Transgender Professional Association for Transgender Health.

David-ette was featured in the Channel 4 show Uncovered. David-ette is also the CEO of Athenella Media Hub.

World Professional Association for Transgender Health awarded David-ette the Harry Benjamin Distinguished Advocacy Award for her work in trans health advocacy in 2024.

== See also ==
- Obioma Chukwuike - Nigerian intersex human-rights activist
- LGBTQ rights in Nigeria
- Intersex human rights
- Olumide Makanjuola - Nigerian co-founder of The Initiative For Equal Rights
