= Blessed Body =

2016 anthology by Unoma Azuah

Blessed Body: The Secret Lives of Lesbian, Gay, Bisexual and Transgender Nigerians
- Editor: Unoma Azuah
- Language: English
- Genre: Non-fiction, anthology, LGBTQ literature
- Publisher: CookingPot Publishing
- Publication date: 2016
- Publication place: Nigeria
- Media type: Print, e-book
- Pages: 267
- ISBN: 9780996546072

Blessed Body: The Secret Lives of Lesbian, Gay, Bisexual and Transgender Nigerians is a 2016 non-fiction anthology edited by Nigerian writer and academic Unoma Azuah. Published by CookingPot Publishing, the book is a collection of 38 personal narratives by 36 lesbian, gay, bisexual, and transgender Nigerians.

The anthology has been described as one of the earliest major collections of first-person LGBTQ narratives from Nigeria and was compiled to document experiences often absent from mainstream Nigerian literature.

== Reception ==
The ICIR's Steve Aborisade described the book as a "compelling" exploration of the realities faced by sexual minorities in Nigeria and praised its collection of personal testimonies documenting struggles with identity, faith, family, and social exclusion. The Nigerian Tribune highlighted the anthology's contribution to discussions of sexuality in Nigeria and noted its focus on the lived experiences of LGBT Nigerians.

Reviewing the anthology in African Literature Today, literary scholar Iniobong I. Uko described the collection as an important body of autobiographical narratives documenting experiences of isolation, rejection, humiliation, and resilience among LGBT Nigerians in both Nigeria and the diaspora.

The anthology has subsequently attracted academic attention in the fields of queer studies and African literature. Scholars have examined its representation of queer childhood, gender nonconformity, homophobia, and identity formation in contemporary Nigerian society.
