= Fimí Sílẹ̀ Forever =

2017 novel by Nnanna Ikpo

Fimí Sílẹ̀ Forever: Heaven Gave It to Me
- Author: Nnanna Ikpo
- Language: English
- Publisher: Team Angelica Publishing
- Publication date: 20 April 2017
- Publication place: Nigeria
- Pages: 304
- ISBN: 9780995516205

Fimí Sílẹ̀ Forever: Heaven Gave It to Me is a 2017 novel by Nigerian writer Nnanna Ikpo. The novel tells the story of twins Olawale and Oluwole from Yoruba land, who are lawyers and human-rights activists but their lives becomes transformed following the enactment of Same Sex Marriage Prohibition Act 2013.

== Background ==
Ikpo conceived the manuscript in 2013 while debates surrounding Nigeria's anti same-sex marriage bill were ongoing. According to him, the original intention was partly to imagine the consequences if the bill became law. After the legislation was enacted in 2014, the political climate and its impact on LGBTQ people in Nigeria significantly influenced the writing process. The novel took approximately four years to complete and was published in 2017 by Team Angelica Publishing. He also cites Randy Shilts, James Hadley Chase, John Russell Gordon, Edwin Cameron, Sharon Khumalo, Binyavanga Wainana, Chimamanda Ngozi Adichie, and Diriye Osman as influences.

== Critical reception ==
The novel received positive responses from reviewers and scholars. Rev. Jide Macaulay, founder of House of Rainbow, praised the work for portraying LGBTQ life in Nigeria and described Ikpo as "a rare Nigerian writer addressing the subject from within the country".

Writing for G. Jacks Writes, Gia Jackson awarded the novel 4.5 out of 5 stars, describing it as an "incredible" and compelling narrative that combines discussions of human rights, religion, politics, and sexuality with a story of family and hope".

The novel was shortlisted for the 30th Lambda Literary Awards for Gay Fiction in 2018.
