= Unbridled (disambiguation) =

Unbridled was an American Thoroughbred racehorse.

Unbridled may also refer to:

- Unbridled (2017 film), a film directed by John David Ware
- Unbridled (2018 film), a Spanish-Italian thriller film
- Unbridled (novel), a 2007 novel by Jude Dibia
