= Temiloluwa Johnson =

Nigerian photojournalist

- Born: 2001 (age 24–25); Lagos
- Citizenship: Nigeria
- Occupations: Photojournalist and Storyteller
- Notable work: Mother Moves, House Approves
- Awards: World Press Photo, Award, 2025

Temiloluwa Johnson (born 2001) is a Nigerian photojournalist and storyteller. She was born in Lagos, Nigeria. In 2025, she won World Press Photo award for her picture, "Mother Moves, House Approves" an image documenting a ballroom event at Pride in Lagos, an underground queer event in Lagos.

== Career ==
Johnson's work explore identity, cultural and social expression, alongside environmental issues. Their winning story for the World Press Photo award, "Mother Moves, House," chronicles what it means for members of Nigeria's LGBTIQ+ community to self-express and celebrate defiance in the country.

Her work has been recognised and featured in competitions and magazines such as PictureThis contest, a contest by Sony Pictures and World Photography Organisation, Autostraddle, The Republic and The Vogue.

== Personal life ==
She identifies as queer and explores LGBTIQ+ experiences through her works.

== Works ==
- Heavenly Bodies

== Awards and honours ==
- 2024 Finalist for Ian Parry Photojournalism Grant
- Member of Black Women's Photographers
