= SVTV Network =

International digital media platform

- Company type: Private
- Founded: 2017
- Headquarters: U.S.
- Founder: Sheri Johnson
- Key people: Sheri Johnson, Founder
- Industry: Entertainment, mass media
- Products: Streaming media; video on demand
- Services: Film production; film distribution; television production; Fast Channel service; ad Sales
- Website: https://www.svtvnetwork.com

Strong Voices TV Network (SVTV) is a subscription-based television network for content about the LGBT community, its allies and advocates. It features videos, movies, films, podcasts, music, and video game from members of the LGBT community. It licenses and produces genres including series, movies, documentaries, podcasts, music, reality series, short films, news, sports, live streaming events, and soon LGBT animation. Along with featuring media products produced by others, SVTV Network produces its own original series and content. The subscription-based network was started by Sheri Johnson, a full-time seventh-grade teacher and creator of the web series “StudvilleTV”.

== History ==
SVTV's founder Sheri Johnson is also the creator of the web series "StudvilleTV" that had 100,000 subscribers in 39 countries and got 5 million views. Johnson and other creators allege a shift in policies and regulations at YouTube discriminated against LGBTQ indie filmmakers resulting in declining ad revenue for their content. In response to partnered advertisers believing themselves to be an unsuitable match for LGBTQ content creators, Johnson decided to create a platform for herself and for the LGBTQ community.

=== Establishment ===
The SVTV Network officially launched its 'On Demand' network in the Fall of 2016 as a website and app combination.

== Flagship shows ==
=== StudvilleTV ===
Created by Sheri Johnson in 2013, the series StudvilleTV ran for four seasons on YouTube. "Based on the lives of Johnson and her three best friends [...] The series explored their lives as lesbians — dating, juggling careers and maneuvering through life together."
