= Nnanna Ikpo =

Nigerian writer

- Born: Nnanna Ikpo; Nigeria
- Citizenship: Nigerian
- Education: Madonna University; Nigerian Law School; University of Pretoria; AFDA
- Occupations: Writer; novelist; lawyer
- Notable work: Fimí Sílẹ̀ Forever (2017)
- Awards: Shortlisted for the 30th Lambda Literary Awards (Gay Fiction), 2018

David Nnanna Ikpo is a Nigerian writer, lawyer, and novelist. He is best known for his 2017 novel, Fimí Sílẹ̀ Forever, which was shortlisted for the Lambda Literary Award for Gay Fiction at the 30th Lambda Literary Awards in 2018. His work spans literature, law, film, and activism, with a focus on LGBTQ+ rights in Africa.

== Early life and education ==
Ikpo studied law at Madonna University in Okija, Nigeria, where he earned his LL.B. before attending the Nigerian Law School in Abuja for his call to the bar qualification. He later earned an LLM/MPhil in Human Rights and Democratisation in Africa from the University of Pretoria in 2016.

In 2023, he completed an Honours degree in Motion Picture Medium at South African School of Motion Picture Medium and Live Performance (AFDA), as well as a doctoral degree at the University of Pretoria. His PhD thesis, titled Using indigenous storytelling and African Commission soft law in Nigerian law classrooms to advance queer rights, examined the application of African Commission Resolution 275 in legal pedagogy.

== Career ==
Ikpo is currently a communications officer at the Centre for Human Rights at the University of Pretoria.

As a human rights advocate, his work integrates law, storytelling, and activism, with a focus on sexual orientation and gender identity issues.

== Books ==
- Fimí Sílẹ̀ Forever: Heaven Gave It to Me. Team Angelica Publishing, 2017.

== See also ==
- Olumide Makanjuola
- University of Pretoria
- Nigerian Law School
- Lambda Literary Award
- Lambda Literary Award for Gay Fiction
