= Love Offers No Safety =

2023 anthology edited by Jude Dibia and Olumide Makanjuola

Love Offers No Safety: Nigeria's Queer Men Speak
- Editor: Jude Dibia; Olumide Makanjuola
- Language: English
- Publisher: Cassava Republic Press
- Publication date: 29 August 2023
- Publication place: Nigeria

Love Offers No Safety: Nigeria's Queer Men Speak is an anthology written by 25 Nigerian men detailing their way of living in Nigeria. Released on 29 August 2023, it was edited by Jude Dibia and Olumide Makanjuola, illustrated by Jamie Keenan, and published by Cassava Republic Press.

== Background ==
Human rights activist Olumide Makanjuola and novelist Jude Dibia edited the book, which was published by Cassava Republic Press. It was made available in UK bookstores on 20 June 2023 and in the US on 14 February 2024. The book details, in a first person narrative, the life of LGBTQ members in Nigeria.

The cover designer is Jamie Keenan.

== Reception ==
The Culture Custodian praised the novel for "challenging the fixed ideologies of the Nigerian populace on 'who a man is and how he is expected to act'".

Love Offers No Safety was listed in the "60 Notable Books of 2023" by Open Country Mag.
