= Shall We Meet Tonight =

- Directed by: Wapah Ezeigwe
- Written by: Wapah Ezeigwe
- Produced by: Bisi Alimi; Lanre Njoku
- Starring: Uzoamaka Onuoha; Goodness Emmanuel; Jasperwills Ebuka
- Cinematography: Ayoola Oladimeji
- Edited by: Ayoola Oladimeji
- Music by: Mcpherson Aghah
- Production company: Vengiance Productions
- Release date: March 21, 2025 (BFI FLARE LGBTQ+ Film Festival)
- Running time: 15 minutes
- Countries: Nigeria; United Kingdom
- Languages: English; Igbo

Shall We Meet Tonight is a 2025 Nigerian LGBT+ romantic short film written and directed by Wapah Ezeigwe, and co-executive produced by Bisi Alimi and Lanre Njoku. The film explores themes of arranged marriage and lesbian love. It was produced by a UK-based African queer-led production company and was selected as an official entry at the BFI Flare: London LGBTIQ+ Film Festival.

== Plot ==
When a young woman is given in marriage to an influential man through an arranged union, she falls in love with a townswoman who becomes her secret lover. The film explores the emotional complexities of queer love and the challenges of existing and navigating a patriarchal Nigerian society.

== Cast ==
- Uzoamaka Onuoha
- Goodness Emmanuel
- Jasperwills Ebuka
- Ugo Doris

== Reception ==
Reviewing the film for What Kept Me Up, Ini-Abasi Jeffrey described it as "a queer essential, yet far from perfect," noting that "the characters never find any depth in the short time we are with them; we never get a sense of Adaora and Susanna's romantic history and how it reached the point we see."

In an interview with Zikoko Magazine, Bisi Alimi said the film was funded by the British Council and the British Film Institute. He also explained that the filmmakers deliberately departed from the tragic narratives often associated with queer stories, as they felt many queer love stories tend to follow that trajectory.

At the third edition of The Filmjoint Awards in 2026, which recognises short films in Nigeria, the film received ten nominations and won three awards.

== Awards ==
- Best African Film – Shall We Meet Tonight (Wapah Ezeigwe)
- Best Picture – Shall We Meet Tonight (Bisi Alimi and Lanre Njoku)
- Best Cinematography – Shall We Meet Tonight (Ayoola Oladimeji)
