= When We Speak of Nothing =

2017 novel by Olumide Popoola

- Author: Olumide Popoola
- Language: English
- Genre: Coming-of-age fiction
- Publisher: Cassava Republic Press
- Publication date: 3 July 2017
- Publication place: Nigeria
- Media type: Print (paperback), e-book
- Pages: 256
- ISBN: 978-1-911115-45-8

When We Speak of Nothing is a 2017 coming-of-age novel by Nigerian-German writer Olumide Popoola. Published by Cassava Republic Press, the novel follows two Black British teenagers, Karl and Abu, whose friendship is tested by racism, family tensions, sexuality, and the 2011 England riots.

== Plot ==
Set primarily in London in 2011, the novel follows Karl and Abu, two close friends growing up near King's Cross. While Abu remains in London amid rising racial tensions, Karl travels to Port Harcourt, Nigeria, after learning that his estranged father is alive. Their experiences are shaped by questions of identity, family, sexuality, and belonging, before converging again in the aftermath of the 2011 England riots.

== Themes ==
Critics have identified race, identity, masculinity, sexuality, friendship, class, and belonging as the novel's principal themes. The story also explores the effects of the 2011 London riots and the environmental crisis in Nigeria's Niger Delta through Karl's experiences in Port Harcourt.

== Reception ==
In a review for Financial Times, Diana Evans described the novel as "a satisfying and perceptive examination of the emergence of the whole person against the odds posed by a constricting society."

Kirkus Reviews praised the novel's ambition in exploring race, identity, class, and sexuality through the experiences of two Black British teenagers, while noting that its multiple storylines occasionally made the narrative feel overcrowded.

Writing for Brittle Paper, Ainehi Edoro described the novel as being "built on multiple threads of suspense" and praised its youthful language and portrayal of two teenagers navigating history and identity.

A review by Jerry Chiemeke for BellaNaija described the novel as "a beautiful story" that explores friendship, racial tensions, family relationships, and adolescence.
