= Area Scatter =

Cross-dressing artist from Nigeria

Uzoma Odimara, popularly known as Area Scatter, was a cross-dressing performer who gained popularity in the post-Nigerian Civil War era of the 1970s in Imo State, Eastern Nigeria.

== Life ==
Area Scatter was from Imo State, South East Nigeria. Little is known about Area Scatter's early life. Scatter was reportedly a civil servant during the years of the Nigerian Civil War.

Towards the end of the civil war, in about 1970, she disappeared into the woods, and the reasons for her disappearance remain very elusive, thus adding an aura of intrigue to her narrative. After her mysterious disappearance for seven months and seven days, she re-emerged from seclusion as a woman, saying that the gods had bestowed supernatural powers upon her. Some believe that through Scatter's seclusion, Scatter had experienced a spiritual transformation.

As an entertainer, Area Scatter performed as a cross-dresser, musician, actor, and comedian. She rose to fame in the late 1970s for her unconventional and daring approach to entertainment. Often, Scatter would wear long white gowns, and her home featured various bones and skulls that represented good and evil. She was known for her flamboyant style as she would braid her hair, wear makeup, and fabrics while walking around in heels, and playing music in the homes of the upper class and the politically important. She was also known for the thumb piano, beautiful voice, and charismatic presence. In one of the few videos that exist of Area Scatter singing, she sings about a man who suffers because he is smaller than everyone else, but then one day, at the market, her meets another man who is smaller than him, and becomes elated to discover that someone is smaller than him.

Little is known about what happened to Area Scatter after the 1970s.

== Legacy ==
Area Scatter was the first publicly-known person to defy the societal gender norms of modern Nigerian society, and is recognized as part of the history of gender and sexuality in Nigeria. She is remembered and referenced by contemporary LGBTQ people in Nigeria.
