= Pride in Lagos =

Annual LGBT event in Lagos, Nigeria

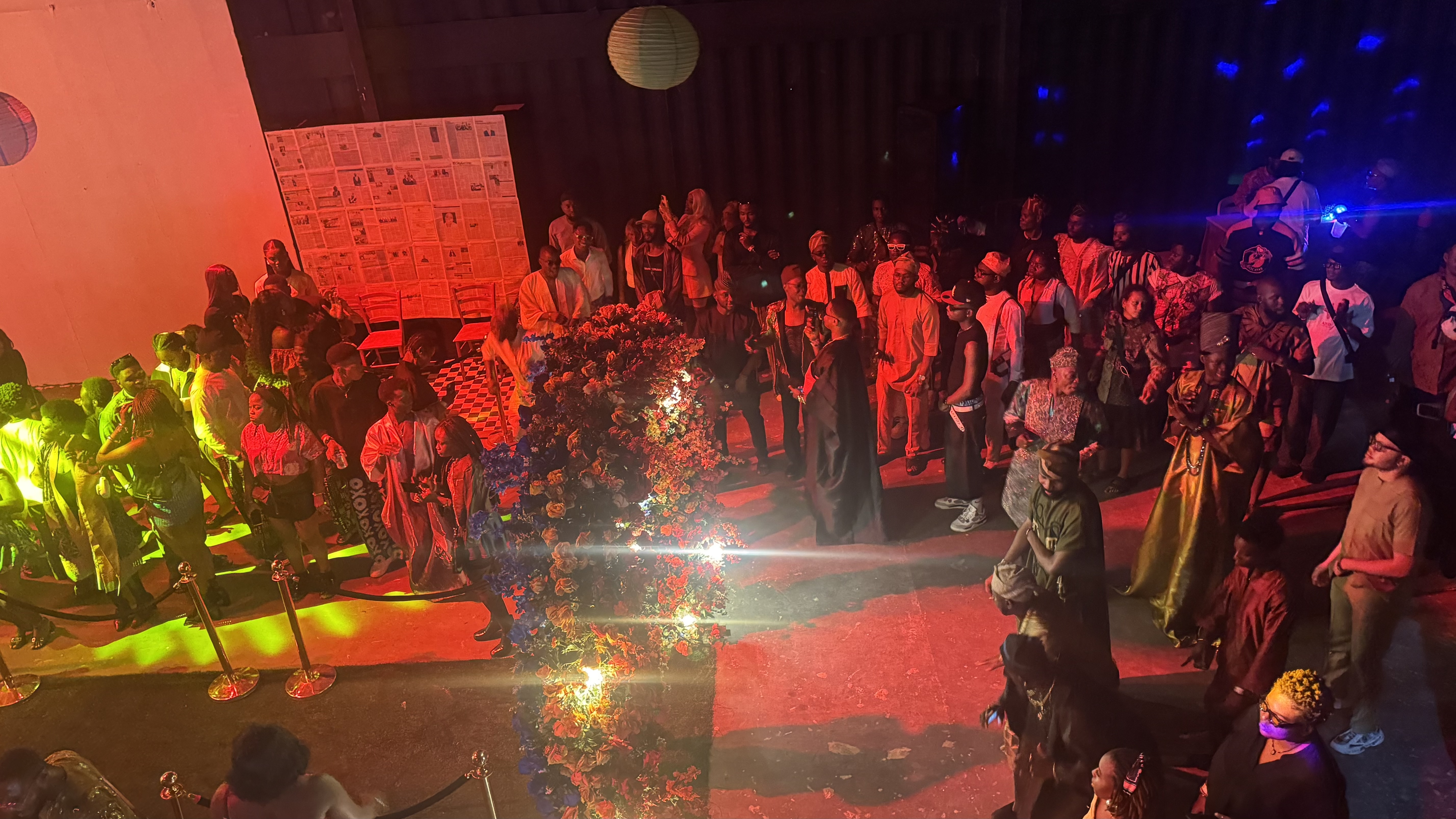
- Pride in Lagos Ball (27 June 2025)
- Frequency: Annually
- Location: Lagos
- Country: Nigeria
- Inaugurated: June 2021
- Next event: June 2026
- Organizer: Queercity Media

Pride in Lagos is an annual LGBTQ pride festival held during the last week of June in Lagos, Nigeria. Founded in 2021 by QueerCity Media, the festival is founded and managed by Olaide Kayode Timileyin, it serves as a platform for visibility, community building, advocacy, and celebration in a highly restrictive legal and social context.

The event has drawn hundreds of queer people each year and has been held consecutively since 2021. The 2022 festival marked Nigeria's first publicly recognised, week-long Pride celebration.

== Context ==
In Nigeria, same-sex relationships, public displays of affection between same-sex persons, and LGBTQ+ organisations are criminalised under the Same-Sex Marriage (Prohibition) Act of 2014, which carries penalties of up to 14 years imprisonment. Despite pervasive stigma, an underground queer culture has persisted in Lagos, including inclusive spaces within fashion, digital communities, and ballroom scenes.

== History ==
Pride in Lagos debuted in June 2021 as a series of discreet events like panels, film screenings, and workshops to foster solidarity and community, marking one of the few structured pride events in Nigeria to date.

From 20–26 June 2022, the festival hosted art exhibitions, panel discussions, a runway show, and a concluding drag and ballroom ball. Organisers described it as "the first of its kind" in terms of reach and impact. It featured prominent queer figures like Aja Kween and Bisi Alimi, along with performer Temmie Ovwasa.

By mid-2023, the event had gained increased visibility, with larger public participation, greater representation of queer creatives, and acknowledgment of the underground ballroom community.

In June 2024, the festival included a high-profile ballroom “neo‑goth” ball in memory of the late Fola Francis, Nigeria’s first openly transgender runway model, who died in December 2023. That year also introduced the Equality Summit & Awards, featuring panels on community safety, economic empowerment, and LGBTQ+ rights advocacy.

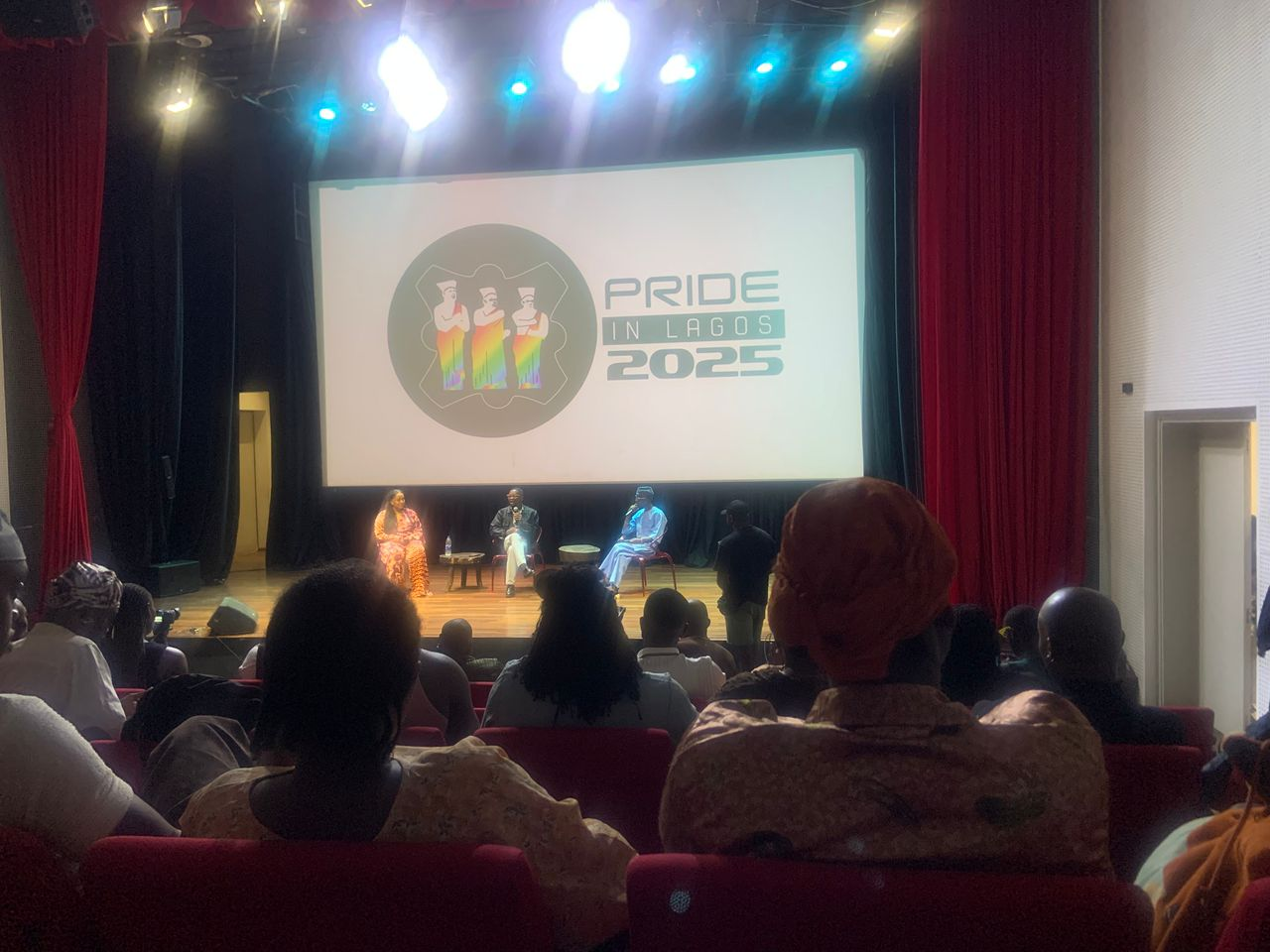
Panel Session at the 2025 Pride in Lagos

The 2025 edition continued the annual tradition with a ballroom ball held on 27 June 2025. It also hosted the Equality Summit with Bisi Alimi as the keynote speaker.

The event continued in 2026, with a celebration in June and the second edition of the Owambe Ball, held at a venue in Lekki, Lagos.

== Programming ==
Typical events during Pride in Lagos include:

- Symposia and panel discussions on queer rights, community safety, mental health, and empowerment.
- Art exhibitions, film screenings, and creative workshops showcasing Nigerian queer talent.
- Ballroom and drag events such as “The Grand Masquerade Ball”, with Afro‑surrealist themes and vogue-style performances.
- Awards ceremonies and networking sessions to elevate organisations and allies working for LGBTQ+ inclusion.

== Safety and security ==
Given Nigeria’s legal constraints, the festival is often held in private or semi-private venues, announced shortly in advance. Organisers implement security measures such as background checks and no-photography policies for attendee protection.

== See also ==
- LGBTQ people in Nigeria
- Temiloluwa Johnson
