= Chitra Nagarajan =

Writer and activist

- Occupations: Activist; Author; Facilitator
- Known for: Human rights activism
- Notable work: She wrote the book titled; She Called Me Woman; The World Was in Our Hands: Voices from the Boko Haram Conflict, was written by her, published in 2025
- Website: https://www.chitranagarajan.com/

Chitra Nagarajan is an activist, author and facilitator who works in the areas of conflict analysis and peace building, the climate crisis, and human rights, particularly of those women and girls, predominantly but not solely in West Africa.

== Career ==
=== Activism ===
Nagarajan has worked with a wide range of various international and grassroots organisations and previously lived and worked in Nigeria. Her work has spanned various sectors, and she has contributed to new areas of analysis by drawing connections between previously unconnected areas of work. In the report "Shoring Up Stability: Addressing Climate & Fragility Risks in the Lake Chad Region", Nagarajan was part of the team who wrote the first ever climate and fragility assessment of a specific region. Her other work includes uncovering and responding to dynamics around gender, disability, and LGBTQI realities when it comes to peace and security, and inter-communal conflict between farmers and pastoralists, explored in a report for Mercy Corps, among other topics. She has also worked for human rights and peace in northern Nigeria and the Boko Haram conflict since 2013, including training soldiers on human rights, international humanitarian law and how to mitigate civilian harm in operations; and looking at reintegration of people formerly associated with armed groups after their exit.

In addition to her research and activism in West Africa, Nagarajan has also been involved in feminist movements in the UK, and was previously on the management committee of Southall Black Sisters. Her approach has been described as having "a deep commitment to centering the voices of those often left unheard."

=== Writing ===
Nagarajan has written for media outlets such as The Guardian, This Is Africa, openDemocracy and the New Internationalist. In 2018, together with Azeenarh Mohammed and Rafeeat Aliyu, Nagarajan co-edited a collection of narratives from queer Nigerian women, called She Called Me Woman. The book has been described as "a space in which transgressive stories of love, lust and longing can be heard on their own terms." Feminist scholar Sara Ahmed noted in the blurb "this book will change lives by giving voice to experiences that are too often forgotten or erased." The book was published within a political context of state-led crackdowns on homosexuality in Nigeria, and as a result, the book "also works as a strong rebuttal to the Same-Sex Marriage Prohibition Act 2013."

In 2025 Nagarajan published The World Was in Our Hands: Voices from the Boko Haram Conflict: a collection of accounts of people living through the Boko Haram conflict, from vastly different perspectives. As part of the research and writing for The World Was in Our Hands, she spent up to five hours with individual people as they narrated the stories of their lives. Part of the motivation behind the book was her desire to shine a light on the diversity of people's experiences that were often different to mainstream narratives shared in the media and through politics. To do so, she held more than 700 interviews over a period of almost ten years. The book was described by journalist and author Angela Saini as a "remarkable chronical of the people who have lived through some of the most harrowing events in recent history, often spoken about, yet rarely listened to."

== Publications ==
=== Books ===
- Nagarajan, Chitra. The World Was in Our Hands: Voices from the Boko Haram Conflict. Cassava Republic Press, 2025. ISBN 978-1913175566
- She Called Me Woman: Nigeria's Queer Women Speak. Cassava Republic Press, 2018, co-edited with Azeenarh Mohammed and Rafeeat Aliyu. ISBN 9781911115595
