= Blackbird (Dibia novel) =

2011 novel by Jude Dibia

- First edition
- Author: Jude Dibia
- Genre: Drama
- Published: 2011
- Publisher: Jalaa Writers' Collective
- Publication place: Nigeria

Blackbird is a 2011 novel by Nigerian author Jude Dibia published by the JALAA Writers’ Collective. Dibia’s third novel follows a complex story of romance and revenge set against the social and political climate of contemporary Nigeria, often told through flashbacks and dream sequences.

== Plot ==
Blackbird opens on preparations for an armed home invasion. Three men—Scorpion, Razor, and Cobra—discuss the logistical details of perpetrating their crime in a wealthy compound, an event later revealed as the infamous rape and murder of socialite, Katherine Cole. Cole’s murder becomes a sort of touchstone throughout the novel, serving as a litmus to gauge attitudes towards race and social mobility in the face of systemic corruption and violent urban development. (Dibia’s depiction of an urban Nigerian ordinary is critical, and comments on the prevalence of everyday crime, corruption, and entrenched economic inequity.)

The story then turns to Maya and Omoniyi, the middle-class parents of Deji, a child suffering from leukemia. For Maya and Omoniyi, supporting their son’s medical needs is difficult. Omoniyi becomes the victim of a wave of chronic unemployment and is laid off from his office job in a shoe factory; Maya is forced, against her husband’s wishes, to sing at local restaurant in order to supplement the family income. Family luck, however, changes when Maya is approached by a wealthy hotel manager, Edward, after her performance at a private party. Omoniyi and Maya are offered and accept employment, room, and board at The Oasis Hotel.

Meanwhile, Edward and his wife, Nduesoh, suffer the everyday pains of a mismatched marriage. Interested in Nduesoh originally for her “exotic” appearance, Edward fashions for the couple a life insulated from anything that Nduesoh knew before, while engaging himself in a development scheme to displace the urban poor. She hardens in her role among the other rich wives, lamenting the racial divide within her elite social circle and the rumors surrounding Edward’s infidelity.

The lives of the two couples cross when Edward invites Maya to sing at the hotel. Soon jealous of the girl, Nduesoh directs her repressed anger and emotion towards Omoniyi, on whom she forces herself as he cleans her penthouse suite. Omoniyi later learns of Edward’s attention toward Maya, and conspires with Nduesoh in a plot to stalk her husband. Owing a favor to an old friend, Omoniyi enlists the aid of Ade (also known as "Scorpion"), a local thug, to follow Edward’s every move.

Nduesoh’s sister, Idara, is engaged to be married to Gabriel, a local police officer working on Scorpion’s case. Recognizing Scorpion’s mugshot among others in her husband’s paperwork, Idara tips off the police regarding Scorpion’s whereabouts. In a police raid thwarted by Scorpion’s gang members, both Nduesoh and Gabriel are killed. For alleged conspiracy and for harboring wanted criminals, both Edward and Omoniyi are sent to prison. Before his release, Edward informs Ominiyi that Maya, too, was found dead.

Omoniyi writes daily to his deceased wife and to Deji apologizing for his involvement. Eventually, he is released into the custody of his sister, Ogoma, who informs him that his wife is, in fact, alive. Maya had been unable to reach Omoniyi in jail and doubted, if momentarily, his innocence in the events. Upon receiving the mass of letters Omoniyi had been writing, Maya forgives her husband and believes his account of the story. Dibia’s novel closes on the image of a blackbird that had bolstered Omoniyi’s spirits in jail.
