= Necessary Fiction =

2025 novel by Eloghosa Osunde

- Book cover
- Author: Eloghosa Osunde
- Language: English
- Publisher: Riverhead Books (US); Fourth Estate (UK); Masobe Books (Nigeria)
- Publication date: 22 July 2025
- Publication place: Nigeria
- Pages: 320
- ISBN: 9780593851203
- Preceded by: Vagabonds!

Necessary Fiction is a 2025 novel by Nigerian writer Eloghosa Osunde. Published by Riverhead Books in the US, Fourth Estate in the UK, and Masobe Books in Nigeria, it is the Osunde's second novel following Vagabonds! (2022).

== Background ==
Osunde has stated that the novel emerged from questions concerning freedom, belonging, family, and self-creation. The author described the work as an attempt to answer "heavy questions" carried for many years and noted that the novel was influenced by ideas first explored in the short story Good Boy.

The novel centers on the dynamics and perspectives of numerous characters, some including Ziz, May, Maro, Akin, Yemisi, and Awele. Written in five parts, the settings range from Lagos, Abuja, and the United States in the past and future.

=== Audiobook ===
The audiobook for this novel consists of thirteen narrators from across seven cities and three continents, and is praised for its collaboration, diversity, and impact to the audiobook industry by more queer and African voices to popularity. The thirteen voices are provided by Nigerian film director Akin Omotoso, actress and singer A'rese Emokpae, actress Uzoamaka Power, journalist Arit Okpo, Atta Otigba, Jerry Iwu, Tayla Kovacevic-Ebong, Tumi Olufawo, Ifeyinwa Unachukwu, David Ijiti, Leo Anifowose, and Osunde themself.

== Reception ==
Kirkus Reviews described it as "a panoramic look at queer life in Nigeria" and praised its treatment of found family and community.

Reviewing the novel for The Big Issue, Annie Hayter characterized it as "a radical, gorgeous queer novel" and praised its depiction of interconnected lives in modern Lagos. The New Yorker described the work as a polyphonic novel about queer young people creating community and carving out space for themselves in an often unwelcoming environment. The Atlantic lauded the novel for its focus on unique family dynamics.
