= Sacrament of Bodies =

2020 poetry collection by Romeo Oriogun

- Author: Romeo Oriogun
- Language: English
- Series: African Poetry Book Series
- Genre: Poetry
- Publisher: University of Nebraska Press
- Publication date: 1 March 2020
- Publication place: Nigeria
- Media type: Print, e-book
- Pages: 78
- ISBN: 9781496219640

Sacrament of Bodies is a 2020 poetry collection by Nigerian poet and writer Romeo Oriogun. Published by the University of Nebraska Press as part of the African Poetry Book Series, the collection explores themes of queerness, grief, exile, religion, violence, migration, desire, and survival.

== Reception ==
Writing for Open Country Mag, Emmanuel Esomnofu described the collection as an "originative work" and praised Oriogun's portrayal of queer bodies, grief, family relationships, and political violence. He noted that the collection contributed to broader conversations about queerness in African literature.

Africa in Words lauded the book for challenging social exclusion by presenting queer people as worthy of dignity and grace. African Writers |s Naza Amaeze Okoli described the book as a work of reclamation and communion, praising its exploration of queer identity, survival, memory, and desire, adding that "the poems bear witness to both suffering and joy while creating a shared record of marginalized experiences".

Sacrament of Bodies was a finalist for the 2021 Lambda Literary Awards.
