= Walking with Shadows =

2005 novel by Jude Dibia

- Author: Jude Dibia
- Language: English
- Publisher: BlackSands Books
- Publication date: 2005
- Publication place: Nigeria
- Media type: Print
- Pages: 221
- ISBN: 9781411619340

Walking with Shadows is a 2005 novel by Nigerian writer Jude Dibia. It follows Adrian "Ebele" Njoko, a successful Lagos businessman whose life is thrown into turmoil when his concealed homosexuality is exposed to his family and colleagues. Widely regarded as the first Nigerian novel to feature a gay man as its central character and to portray his experiences sympathetically, the book is considered a landmark work in both Nigerian and African LGBTQ literature.

Set in Lagos, Nigeria, the novel explores themes of identity, marriage, family expectations, religion, secrecy, and social prejudice over a particular sexual orientation. Through Adrian's struggle to reconcile his sexuality with societal expectations, Dibia examines the challenges faced by LGBTQ people in Nigeria.

== Reception ==
Critics have described Walking with Shadows as a groundbreaking and controversial work that challenged prevailing literary and social attitudes toward LGBTQ people in Nigeria.

Literary scholars have identified the novel as a pioneering text in Nigerian queer literature. Kerry Manzo, writing in African Literature Today, described it as "one of the first Nigerian novel-length explorations of same-sex desire and identity negotiations within a homophobic social environment".

Academic studies have further examined the novel's representation of sexuality, identity construction, masculinity, and social exclusion. Scholars have argued that the work opened new possibilities for the depiction of queer characters in Nigerian fiction and inspired subsequent generations of writers to engage more openly with LGBTQ themes.
