= Pamela Adie =

Nigerian LGBT rights activist and filmmaker

- Born: Biwom Pamela Adie; 15 April 1984 (age 42); Calabar, Cross River State, Nigeria
- Education: Webster University; University of Wisconsin; University of Baltimore
- Occupations: activist, public speaker and filmmaker
- Known for: Under the Rainbow, Ìfé

Pamela Adie (born Biwom Pamela Adie; 15 April 1984) is a Nigerian LGBT rights activist, public speaker, screenwriter and filmmaker. Pamela is hailed as a prominent public speaker advocating for LGBTQ community and has often raised her voice on empowering LGBTQ community in Nigeria. Her research and works about LGBT rights in Nigeria have featured in several LGBT anthology series. She rose to prominence with her directorial debut Under the Rainbow, which reflects her personal memoir. Her production venture Ìfé is deemed as Nigeria's first lesbian film. She is the executive director of non governmental organisation Equality Hub.

== Biography ==
Although she was married to a man, she revealed that she is openly lesbian in an announcement made in 2011 after discussing with her family members. She hails from Calabar, Cross River State.

== Career ==
Adie pursued her MBA degree at the Webster University and completed her master's degree from the University of Baltimore. She obtained her bachelor's degree in Business administration from the University of Wisconsin-Superior. She pursued her career as an LGBT rights advocate and officially became Nigeria's first lesbian activist. She also attended the World Economic Forum in 2017 and spoke in the inaugural edition of the "Meet Leading LGBT Rights Activists". In the forum, she also addressed the importance of including LGBT people in the workplace.

She wrote, directed and produced Nigeria’s first lesbian-focused documentary film titled Under the Rainbow (2019) which largely focuses on her personal life. In 2019, she was one of ten nominees shortlisted for the inaugural edition of the Mary Chirwa Award for Courageous Leadership, which was initiated in 2018.

She sits on the decision-making panel for Initiative Sankofa d’Afrique de l’Ouest.

=== Ìfé ===
Adie announced her intention on making a feature film on lesbian community in Nigeria and executively produced the film Ìfé. The production of the film became controversial due to the government ban on lesbian related work. The project was initiated jointly by Uyaiedu Ikpe-Etim and Adie in collaboration with the Equality Hub. The film is regarded as Nigeria's first ever lesbian feature film and concerns about censorship also emerged due to its genre. However, the release of the film was delayed due to censorship issues, and Adie, along with the film’s director, was threatened by the authorities with possible imprisonment after allegations emerged that the filmmakers intended to release the film internationally.
