= Uyaiedu Ikpe-Etim =

Nigerian film producer, screenwriter and filmmaker

- Born: 1989 (age 36–37); Lagos, Nigeria
- Education: University of Cyprus
- Occupations: Film producer, screenwriter, filmmaker
- Organization: Co-Founder Hashtag Media House
- Parent: Patrick Ikpe Etim
- Relatives: Nse Ikpe-Etim

Uyaiedu Ikpe-Etim (born June 7, 1989) is a Nigerian film producer, screenwriter and filmmaker, who creates works which tell the stories of Nigeria's marginalised LGBTQ communities. In 2020, the BBC included her in its list of the 100 Women of the Year. In 2015, she gave a TEDx talk, Becoming Free of the English Box.

== Biography ==
Ikpe-Etim was born in 1989. She is co-founder of the production company Hashtag Media House, and since 2011, she has worked to give voice to the Nigeria's minority communities, especially the LGBTQ community there. The rights of the LGBT community in Africa are severely persecuted, and Nigeria and its film industry are no exception: in Nollywood homosexual characters are ridiculed and portrayed as predators, moved by economic interests or under the influence of cults and spells and often end up being punished for their actions or saved by the church. Those films that feature the LGBTQ community in Nigeria, usually feature homosexual men.

In 2020, Ikpe-Etim, along with film producer Pamela Adie came to prominence in Nigeria due to their production of the film Ìfé. The film was Ikpe-Etim's directorial debut and tells a love story between two women. Ìfé is not the first lesbian-themed film to be produced in Nigeria, but it is the first to show such a relationship normally, without prejudice or stereotypes. Indeed the producer, director and actors in the lead roles are all members of Nigeria's LGBT community. Ikpe-Etim is queer. However, the production had to face the National Board of Film and Video Censors, which went so far as to threaten its creators with prison sentences for "encouraging homosexuality" in a country where same-sex marriage was banned by law since 2014. In fact, to avoid censorship, the film was released abroad in October 2020, at the Toronto LGBT Film Festival. It was released ultimately on the streaming platform ehtvnetwork.com. It was screened at the Leeds International Film Festival in November 2020.

She is the younger sister of Nollywood actress Nse Ikpe Etim.

== Awards ==
In 2020, Ikpe-Etim was listed as one of the BBC's 100 Women for 2020, recognising her contributions to women's rights in Nigeria.

== Movies ==
- Ìfé (2020) as Director and Writer
- Nkoyo (2021)
- No Fury (2024) as Writer
- Trepidation (2024) as Writer
