= Nomad (poetry collection) =

2022 poetry collection by Romeo Oriogun

- Author: Romeo Oriogun
- Language: English
- Genre: Poetry
- Publisher: Griots Lounge Publishing
- Publication date: 2022
- Publication place: Nigeria
- Media type: Print
- Pages: 116

Nomad is a 2022 poetry collection by Nigerian poet and essayist Romeo Oriogun. It was published by Griots Lounge Publishing.

The collection follows journeys across West Africa, North Africa, Europe, and the United States, examining both physical migration and emotional displacement. Critics have noted its engagement with historical subjects such as slavery, the Middle Passage, forced migration, and the search for home in a globalized world.

== Reception ==
Nomad received widespread critical acclaim and won the 2022 Nigeria Prize for Literature, one of Africa's most prestigious literary awards.

The panel of judges for the Nigeria Prize for Literature described the collection as "the most technically accomplished" among the shortlisted works, praising its treatment of migration through lyrical language and noting that its 67 poems were unified by a travel motif linked to both the African past and future.

Reviewing the collection, Samuel Osaze described Nomad as rich in imagery and personification, highlighting its use of the Sahara Desert as a witness to migration, suffering, and human history.

Emmanuel Esomnofu, writing for Márọkọ́ Magazine, praised the collection's examination of movement, migration, and historical memory, arguing that it expanded themes first explored in Oriogun's earlier collection Sacrament of Bodies.

== Awards ==
- 2022 Nigeria Prize for Literature (Poetry)
