= Embracing My Shadow =

2020 memoir by Unoma Azuah

Embracing My Shadow: Growing Up Lesbian in Nigeria
- Author: Unoma Azuah
- Language: English
- Genre: Memoir, autobiography
- Publisher: Beaten Track Publishing
- Publication date: 1 March 2020
- Publication place: Nigeria
- Pages: 228
- ISBN: 9781786453730

Embracing My Shadow: Growing Up Lesbian in Nigeria is a 2020 memoir by Nigerian writer and activist Unoma Azuah. It recounts Azuah's experiences growing up as a lesbian in her country and her struggles with family expectations, religion, ethnic identity, discrimination, and homophobia. It has been described by as the first published memoir by a Nigerian lesbian.

== Background ==
Azuah wrote the memoir as a personal account of her childhood, adolescence, and early adulthood in Nigeria. The narrative is set against a social environment in which homosexuality is widely stigmatized and legally restricted. She has stated that the work seeks to document experiences often omitted from mainstream Nigerian autobiographical writing.

== Synopsis ==
Azuah begins from her childhood to adulthood, describing her experiences of abuse, ethnic discrimination, patriarchy and homophobia. She narrates her ordeal as a black child growing up in a family shaped by the Nigerian Civil War and its aftermath. Her father was a Nigerian soldier, while her mother was Igbo from the former secessionist state of Biafra.

The memoir explores the effects of such conflict, social prejudice, and religious attempts to change her sexual orientation, including Christian deliverance sessions intended to "cure" her homosexuality.

== Themes ==
=== Sexual identity ===
A central theme of the memoir is the writer's process of understanding and accepting her sexual identity within a predominantly heteronormative society. Literary scholars have noted that the memoir presents queerness as part of everyday life rather than as an abstract political issue.

=== Family and religion ===
The memoir examines the intersection of sexuality, family relationships, and ethnic identity. Azuah reflects on tensions within her family, including her relationship with her parents and the influence of the Nigerian Civil War on her upbringing. The work discusses the role of religion in shaping attitudes toward homosexuality in Nigeria. Scholars have analyzed the memoir as a critique of social taboos and homophobia while documenting the author's search for selfhood and acceptance.

== Reception ==
Embracing My Shadow received attention from literary critics and scholars for its contribution to LGBT literature in Africa. Reviewing the work for Africa in Words, Pernille Nailor described it as "a powerful account of growing up lesbian in Nigeria and praised its exploration of gender and sexuality within a restrictive social environment".

The memoir is regarded as a landmark work in Nigerian LGBTQ literature. It has been cited alongside Chike Frankie Edozien's Lives of Great Men: Living and Loving as an African Gay Man as one of the earliest Nigerian memoirs centered on queer experiences.
