= Jide Macaulay =

British-Nigerian LGBTQ rights activist

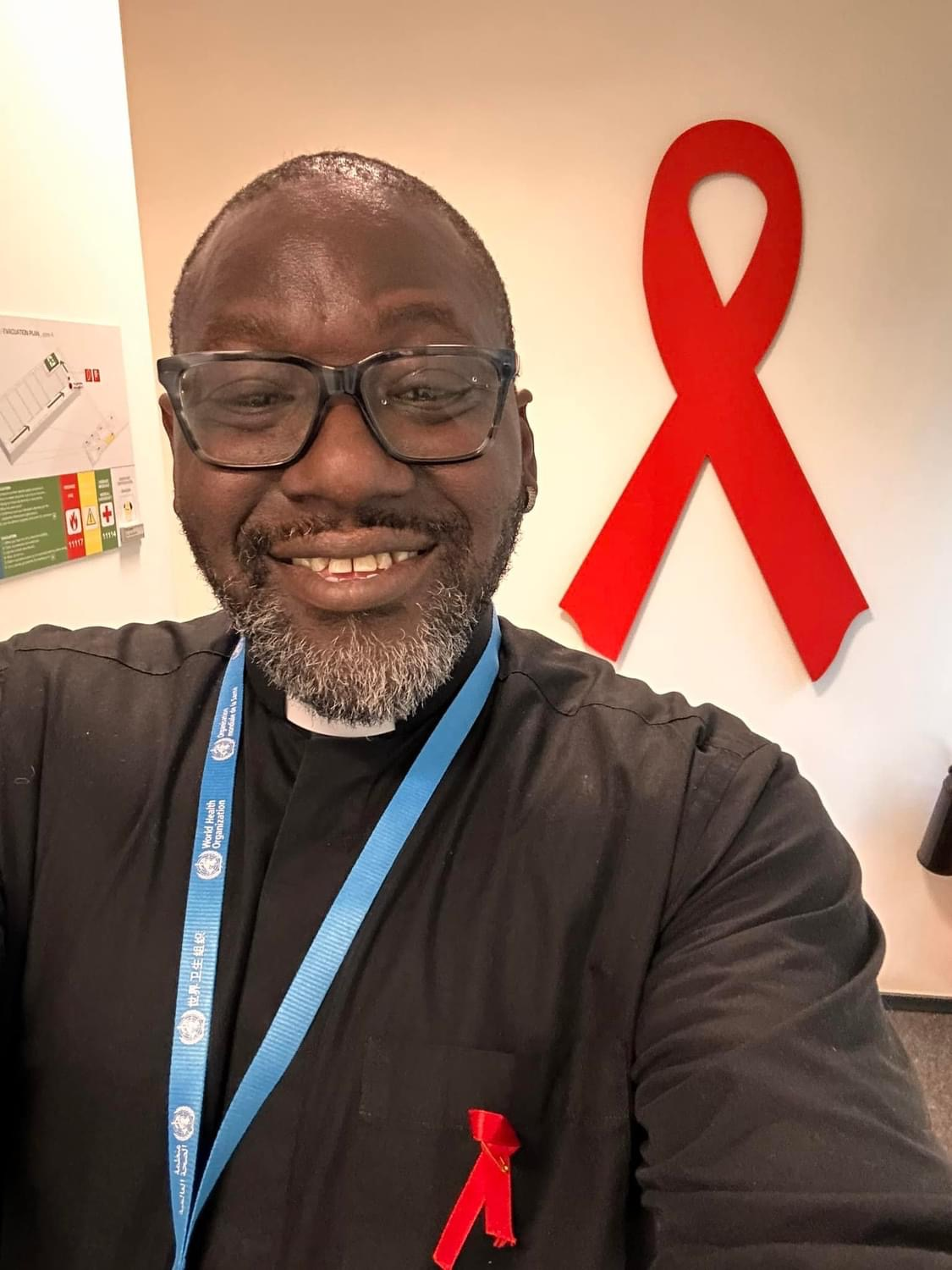
- Born: Rowland Ayoola Babajide Macaulay; 4 November 1965 (age 60); London
- Other name: Rev. Jide Macaulay
- Citizenship: British Nigerian
- Education: United Bible University, Anglia Ruskin University, Pacific School of Religion
- Alma mater: Thames Valley University
- Occupations: Activist, Clergy
- Parents: August Olakunle Macaulay (father); Helen Olusola Macaulay (mother)
- Website: https://www.houseofrainbow.org

Jide Macaulay (born Rowland Ayoola Babajide Macaulay; 4 November 1965) is an openly gay British-Nigerian LGBTQ rights activist and Anglican minister. Macaulay founded the House of Rainbow, which provides support for LGBTQ persons in Nigeria.

== Early life and education ==
Macaulay was born in London in 1965 to August Olakunle Macaulay, a Nigerian theologian and Helen Olusola Macaulay, a midwife.. Macaulay trained at the Pacific School of Religion, Berkeley, California. He also obtained a Bachelor of Laws degree from Thames Valley University in London, master’s degree in practical theology from the United Bible University and a post-graduate certificate in pastoral theology from Anglia Ruskin University.

== Career ==
Macaulay began his ministry in 1998 and has since become a prominent voice for inclusion within Christian communities. In 2013, he was ordained as a priest in the Church of England, marking a significant moment for LGBTQ inclusion in religious leadership. His work focuses on harmonising sexuality, spirituality, and human rights. He has served as a trustee for the Kaleidoscope Trust UK and Global Interfaith Network, and currently chairs INERELA+ Europe, an interfaith network of religious leaders living with or affected by HIV.

== Impact in the LGBTQIA+ community ==
In 2006, Macaulay founded House of Rainbow, a faith-based initiative that began as a weekly gathering for LGBTQ Christians in Lagos, Nigeria. The group was quickly labelled by local media as “Nigeria’s first gay church.” The visibility of the group led to public backlash, including threats and attacks, forcing Macaulay to leave Nigeria and continue his work in the UK. Today, House of Rainbow operates in over 22 countries across Africa and the Caribbean, offering spiritual support and advocacy for LGBTQIA+ people of faith.

== Personal life ==
Macaulay, like Bisi Alimi, has openly declared he is living with HIV and has continued to use his platform to advocate for people living with HIV, especially within religious communities. He has served as a volunteer chaplain at Mildmay Mission Hospital in London and promotes education and empowerment for religious leaders affected by HIV. Despite his advocacy, Macaulay frequently faces online abuse and homophobic attacks, particularly from Nigerian social media users. He continues to speak out against discrimination and remains committed to fostering inclusive faith spaces.

== Publications ==
- Macaulay, Jide. “Spreading the News of God's Unconditional Love in Nigeria.” In Queer Ministers’ Voices from the Global South, edited by Adriaan van Klinken and Johanna Stiebert, Routledge, 2023. ISBN 9781003348764.
- Macaulay, Jide. Contribution in Black and Gay in the UK: An Anthology, edited by John R Gordon and Rikki Beadle-Blair. Team Angelica, 2014. ISBN 9780956971968.

== See also ==
- Bisi Alimi – Nigerian gay rights activist and HIV advocate
