= The Peculiar Kind =

- Genre: Docu-series
- Created by: Alexis Casson
- Directed by: Alexis Casson; Mursi Haynes; Caneisha Haynes
- Country of origin: United States
- Original language: English
- No. of seasons: 2
- No. of episodes: 10

Production
- Producer: Alexis Casson
- Production locations: Brooklyn, New York

Original release
- Release: February 16, 2012 – November 22, 2013

The Peculiar Kind is an American web docu-series produced by Alexis Casson. The series features interviews with lesbian and queer women of color living in Brooklyn, New York. The series ran for two season, and the first episode premiered online in February 2012. The final episode aired in November 2013. The Peculiar Kind was recommended by outlets such as HuffPost, Bitch, and AfterEllen.

== Synopsis ==
The Peculiar Kind (TPK) is a web series that consists of interviews with queer women of color on topics such as safe sex, gender roles among queer women, and polyamory. The women interviewed were residents of Brooklyn, New York. The interview footage is mixed in with news segments, group conversations, and footage of the interviewees in the city.

== Cast ==
- Ivette
- Murielle
- Jade Foster
- K.C.
- Sara
- Mila
- Crystal
- Liz
- Kristin

== Production ==
TPK was developed and produced by Alexis Casson and Mursi Layne, Black lesbian creative partners of The Architects art collective. They aimed to create a series that was candid, enjoyable to watch, and "that didn’t have the stereotypical docu-series dynamic or the drama filled, overtly degrading aspect of female driven reality television." The series' name was selected to be ironic, to indicate to the viewers that LGBTQ people are not unusual. Casson, Layne, and Caneisha Haynes directed the series.

TPK premiered online in February 2012.

== Episodes ==
=== Season 1 (2012) ===
| No. overall | No. in season | Title | Original release date |
|---|---|---|---|
| 1 | 1 | "The Morning After" | February 16, 2012 |
| 2 | 2 | "The Abstract" | March 21, 2012 |
| 3 | 2.5 | "For Hire" | April 25, 2012 |
| 4 | 3 | "Where I'm From" | May 21, 2012 |
| 5 | 4 | "Pillow Talk" | July 20, 2012 |
| 6 | 5 | "Queers in the Media" | August 23, 2012 |
| 7 | 5.5 | "Artist Spotlight" | August 23, 2012 |
Featuring Syd tha Kyd, THEESatisfaction, Ayo Leilani, Siaira Shawn, Alexa Hall

=== Season 2 (2013) ===
| No. overall | No. in season | Title | Original release date |
|---|---|---|---|
| 8 | 1 | "By Definition" | March 2, 2013 |
| 9 | 2 | "'Modern' Family" | June 20, 2013 |
| 10 | 3 | "LGBT Homeless Youth" | November 22, 2013 |

== Critical reception ==
Phoenix of Autostraddle wrote in a review: "What’s maybe the coolest part about this series is that it speaks directly to traditionally marginalized communities without tokenizing its cast members. They’re each totally free to – and totally comfortable with – expressing themselves and their character, and it many ways, that is a radical act in itself."

The series was recommended by HuffPost, For Harriet, Bitch, AfterEllen, and MetroSource.

The episode "LGBT Homeless Youth" was a finalist for the 2014 Media for a Just Society Awards presented by the National Council on Crime and Delinquency.

== Documentary ==
In November 2012, the series was released as a documentary called The Peculiar Kind: The Doc with clips from the web series and some original footage.
