= Unbridled (novel) =

Novel by Jude Dibia

- Author: Jude Dibia
- Language: English
- Subject: Gender identification, sexual abuse, patriarchy
- Genre: Literary fiction
- Set in: Nigeria
- Publication place: Nigeria
- Media type: Print (hardcover)
- Pages: 248 (Note: for the 2009 edition)
- Awards: Nigeria Prize for Literature
- ISBN: 9781770095267 (2009 edition)

Unbridled is a novel written by Nigerian novelist Jude Dibia. It was first published in 2007.
