= Romeo Oriogun =

Nigerian poet

- Citizenship: Nigeria
- Education: Iowa Writers' Workshop
- Occupation: Poet
- Employer: Florida Atlantic University
- Awards: Brunel University African Poetry Prize Nigeria Prize for Literature

Oluwasegun Romeo Oriogun is a Nigerian poet and essayist. He is the author of The Gathering of Bastards (2023) and Sacrament of Bodies (2020) and three chapbooks. He won the 2017 Brunel University African Poetry Prize and the Nigeria Prize for Literature award 2022 (the first openly queer writer to win) for his collection Nomad and was a finalist for the 2020 Lambda Literary Award for Gay Poetry and The Future Awards African Prize for Literature.

He has received fellowships and support from Ebedi International Writers Residency, Harvard University, Hutchins Center for African and African American Research, Oregon Institute for Creative Research, and the IIE- Artist Protection Fund. His poems have appeared in Poetry Foundation, Harvard Review, American Poetry Review, Narrative Magazine.

Oriogun received his MFA in creative writing from the Iowa Writers Workshop in 2020. He is an assistant professor at Florida Atlantic University.

== Bibliography ==
• Gathering Of Bastards

- Sacraments Of Bodies
- Nomad
