= Eloghosa Osunde =

Nigerian writer

- Education: University of Nottingham; New York Film Academy
- Occupation: Writer
- Writing career
- Notable works: Vagabonds! (2022); Necessary Fiction (2025)
- Website: www.eloghosaosunde.com

Eloghosa Osunde is a Nigerian writer of fiction. They have published two novels—Vagabonds! (2022) and Necessary Fiction (2025)—and several short stories. Osunde’s work explores themes of identity and interpersonal intimacies as well as psychology, spirituality and sexuality.

== Early life and career ==
Osunde was raised in Lagos, Nigeria although they are from Benin City. They moved to UK at 16. They studied economics at the University of Nottingham.

Osunde has attended different writing workshops and has writing short stories, among them, those that have appeared in The Paris Review, Granta, The Georgia Review, Guernica, and Literary Hub. Their visual work has been featured in Vogue, The New York Times, and Paper.

In 2017, they were awarded the Miles Morland Writing Scholarship. In 2020, they became a MacDowell Fellow. Osunde was the judge for the 2021 prose category of the Fugue Journal's annual writing contest.

== Awards ==
- Long listed for the Writivism Short Story Prize, 2017
- Plimpton Prize, 2021 for "Good Boy" short story
- American Society of Magazine Editors' National Magazine Awards, 2022 for "After God, Fear Women."
- The New York Times Editors' Choice, 2022
- Edmund White Award, 2023
- Finalist for the Museum of the African Diaspora's African Literary Award, 2023

== Bibliography ==
- Vagabonds! (2022). Riverhead Books ISBN 9780593330029
- Necessary Fiction (2025). Riverhead Books ISBN 9780008708610
