= Jerry Chiemeke =

Nigerian writer

Jerry Chiemeke (born 1 May 1991) is a Nigerian writer, lawyer, journalist, and film critic. Chiemeke won the 2017 Ken Saro-Wiwa Prize for Criticism.

== Early life and education ==
Jerry Chiemeke was born on 1 May 1991 in Warri, Delta State, Nigeria, to Stephen Chiemeke, a civil servant with the Federal Ministry of Environment, and the late Veronica Chiemeke, who worked as a teacher.

He developed an early interest in literature, reading the works of writers such as Chinua Achebe, Cyprian Ekwensi, Charles Dickens, H. Rider Haggard and James Hadley Chase. He was also exposed to film at a young age and grew up watching films featuring actors including Jean-Claude Van Damme, Jackie Chan, Cynthia Rothrock and Sean Connery.

Chiemeke attended Lumen Christi International High School, Uromi, Edo State, completing his secondary education in 2007. He subsequently studied law at the University of Benin, graduating in 2012 with a Second Class Upper Division degree. He was called to the Nigerian Bar in 2013 after completing his training at the Nigerian Law School.

== Career ==
Chiemeke began publishing his writing publicly in 2013, initially sharing short fiction and essays on social media before launching a personal blog later that year. The blog served as an early outlet for his short stories and flash fiction, some of which were submitted to literary contests.

In 2017, he won the Ken Saro-Wiwa Prize for Criticism for his work in literary and cultural commentary. He was later shortlisted for the Diana Woods Memorial Award in 2019.

Alongside his creative writing, Chiemeke has worked as a journalist and film critic. He was the pioneer editor-in-chief of Afrocritik, a culture and entertainment publication. He has represented Nigeria at international film festivals including the Sundance Film Festival, Berlinale, Blackstar Film Festival, and the Durban International Film Festival.

From 2019, he has also worked in media and marketing roles, alongside his continued involvement in writing and cultural criticism.

His poetry collection The Colours in These Leaves (2017) was reviewed by Ikechukwu Nwaogu in P.M. News as a reflective work concerned with loneliness, heartbreak, and emotional uncertainty. The review noted the book's division into metaphorical sections, described as "Rooms", which function as frames for examining different emotional states. Timi Odueso writing for The NEWS described the collection as an exploration of adulthood, noting its contemplative tone and focus on internal conflict.

Notes for Nnedimma (2019) was the subject of several reviews that focused on its examination of romantic relationships and emotional vulnerability. Writing in This Day, Michael Chiedoziem Chukwudera observed that the collection explores love and intimacy through poems that move between vulnerability and reflection. Ayodele Ibiyemi writing in Nigerian Tribune similarly commented on the emotional intensity of the work, noting its emphasis on passion, longing, and solitude.

Chiemeke's short story collection Dreaming of Ways to Understand You (2020) was reviewed in Business Day, which described the book as a cohesive collection marked by narrative consistency and stylistic restraint. Critical response to Dreaming of Ways to Understand You has also been noted in The Lagos Review. Olukorede Yishau described the collection as immediately engaging, observing that the opening line draws readers in before transitioning into stories that combine emotional range with cultural commentary.

== Works ==
=== Poetry ===
- The Colours in These Leaves (2017)
- Notes for Nnedimma (2019)

=== Short story collections ===
- Dreaming of Ways to Understand You (2020)
