= She Called Me Woman =

Nigerian interview collection

- Editor: Chitra Nagarajan; Azeenarh Mohammed; Rafeet Aliyu
- Language: English
- Genre: Non-Fiction, Queer and Women's Studies
- Publisher: Cassava Republic Press
- Publication date: April 24, 2018
- Publication place: Lagos, Nigeria
- Media type: Print, e-book
- Pages: 339
- ISBN: 978-1911115601

She Called Me Woman: Nigeria's Queer Women Speak is a collection of interviews exploring what it means to be a queer woman in Nigeria, edited by Chitra Nagarajan, Azeenarh Mohammed, and Rafeet Aliyu. The collection explores the experiences of queer women as they navigate relationships, financial independence, and freedom while building their lives in a society that often marginalizes them. It was published by Cassava Republic Press.

== Plot ==
The book is a collection of narratives exploring what it means to be a queer Nigerian woman. The stories capture the joy and excitement of first love, as well as experiences of betrayal, sexuality, spirituality, addiction, childhood, laughter, and what it means to exist in a climate of fear.

The collection features the experiences of queer Nigerian women living in different states, including Maiduguri, Zamfara, Imo, Oyo, Abuja, Plateau, Lagos, Ondo, emigrants and others. It invites readers to rethink Nigerian womanhood beyond the gender binary.

== Reception ==
Sabo Kpade, writing for The Guardian Nigeria, described the book as an important rebuttal to the Same Sex Marriage (Prohibition) Act, arguing that one of its common themes is that Nigerian society often fails to support individuals' dreams and aspirations regardless of their sexual orientation. Iniobong I. Uko, writing for Cambridge University Press, described the collection as a valuable addition to the corpus of expressions by members of the LGBT community.

Brittle Paper described the book as a celebration of brave women navigating religion and sexuality. AfterEllen described the book as one filled with love and warmth.
