= Rag Tag =

- Directed by: Adaora Nwandu
- Written by: Adaora Nwandu
- Produced by: Adaora Nwandu; Uzoamaka Nwandu
- Starring: Daniel "Danny" Parsons; Adedamola Adelaja
- Edited by: Andy Hague
- Music by: Kyan Laslett O'Brien; Jack Molder; Tamara Douglas-Morris
- Release dates: 21 April 2006 (Reel World Film Festival); 31 October 2008 (United Kingdom)
- Running time: 110 minutes
- Countries: United Kingdom; Nigeria
- Language: English

Rag Tag is a 2006 British-Nigerian drama film written and directed by Adaora Nwandu, and was Nwandu's debut feature film. The film explores the lives of two childhood friends, nicknamed "Rag" and "Tag" as they navigate life as black immigrants in Britain and come to terms with their attraction to one another. Rag Tag received its American premiere at the 2006 San Francisco International LGBT Film Festival.

== Plot ==
Two childhood friends are reunited after many years and discover their feelings for one another have taken a new turn in this drama. Raymond (Danny Parsons), known to his friends as 'Rag', was born in London to parents who were expatriates from Jamaica, and as a child his best mate was Tagbo (Damola Adelaja), or 'Tag' for short, whose folks were émigrés from Nigeria. When Rag was sent to live with his Grandmother, he and Tag lost touch with one another, and went on to live different lives as adults.

Rag, a hustler with a great ability to break in through windows, leaves behind an ex-girlfriend and child in Birmingham to move back to London, looking to reconnect with his best friend. While Tag has graduated with honors from law school and is looking for work while dating Olivia (Tasmin Clarke), a white political activist, and still living at home. Rag finds Tag, and despite their differences they soon become fast friends again. Rag and Tag seem to understand one another and connect on a level others do not, and when Tag brings Rag along for a trip to Nigeria, their friendship moves to the next level. While Rag realizes their true feelings and attraction, Tag is still reluctant to actually go through the "last" step. However, and through it all, they will do all they can do to take care and watch each other's back.

== Cast ==
Actor	Role
Daniel "Danny" Parsons	Raymond "Rag"
Adedamola "Damola" Adelaja	Tagbo "Tag"
Tasmin Clarke	Olivia
Geoffrey Aymer	Pa Tagbo
Maria Adeioye	Ma Tagbo
Enor Ewere	Rachel
Chuma Oraedu	Xin
Ayo Fawole	Olisa
Ikenna 'Macoy' Akwari	Ikeora
Rachael Young	Heather
Kristian Ademola	Wing Tat
Olivette Cole-Wilson	Sylvia
Lamarr Nestor-Thelwell	Tag, age 12
Chanelle Wilshire	Keisha
Amanda Annan	Ruqaya
Gayle Dudley	Debbie

== Reception ==
The film was praised for its depiction of daily life among Black British communities, and for its depiction of the struggles faced by the LGBT community in Nigeria. Writing in Variety, Dennis Harvey said that "If Rag Tag feels undercooked, it’s still a stew of intriguing ingredients, enough such to hold the attention and suggest Nwandu as a coming talent".

David McAlmont of The Guardian compared the film to his own experiences as a black gay man, writing that "The film reminds me of the genuine terror that confronts black men who are gay. A combination of African machismo, religious fervour and racial suspicion, understanding of homosexuality as a "white disease", and aggressive beliefs about the way that black men should 'reprazent' in the western world have dogged my liberty throughout both my out and closeted life".

== Black Women Filmmakers Reclaiming Representation ==
Adaora Nwandu’s role as a Black woman director in Rag Tag exemplifies the unique perspective Black women bring to British cinema, challenging historical underrepresentation and stereotypical portrayals. According to Emilie Herbert, Black women filmmakers have historically faced exclusion from the British film industry, often working outside mainstream channels due to systemic barriers. In Rag Tag, Nwandu defies this marginalization by crafting an intimate narrative centered on Black queer love, a story rarely depicted in British media.

Herbert notes that Black women directors frequently employ personal storytelling and alternative production methods to bypass industry gatekeeping, which aligns with Nwandu’s independent approach. By foregrounding the emotional complexity of Black queer lives, Rag Tag resists reductive narratives often imposed by mainstream cinema. The film’s exploration of identity, migration, and belonging reflects what Herbert describes as the “re-presentation” of marginalized identities, where directors like Nwandu reshape cultural narratives by reclaiming Black experiences through a personal lens.

Nwandu’s work echoes the efforts of pioneers such as Ngozi Onwurah and Cecile Emeke, who, as Herbert explains, redefine Black womanhood on screen by subverting dominant cinematic norms and asserting creative agency. Through Rag Tag, Nwandu positions herself within this legacy, demonstrating the critical role Black women filmmakers play in expanding the representational possibilities of British cinema.
