= Olumide Makanjuola =

Nigerian sexual and human right activist

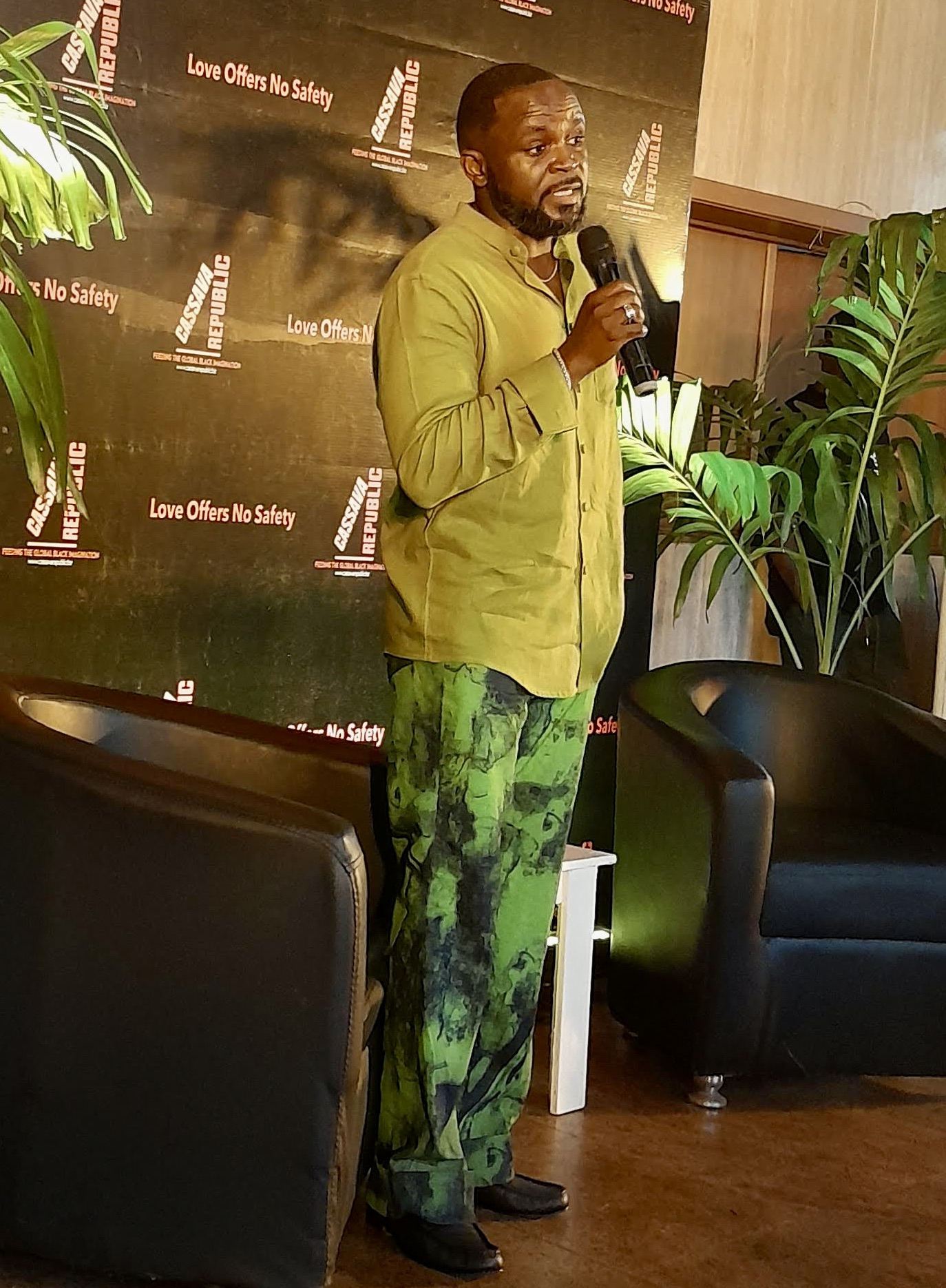
- Olumide Makanjuola at the launch of Love Offers No Safety (2023)
- Born: Olumide Femi Makanjuola; 7 June 1984 (age 42); Lagos, Nigeria
- Citizenship: Nigerian
- Education: Ogun State Institute of Technology; Anglia Ruskin University
- Occupations: Human rights activist; storyteller; social entrepreneur
- Known for: Human rights activism; LGBT advocacy; social justice; storytelling
- Website: olumidemakanjuola.com

Olumide Makanjuola (audio; born 7 June 1984) is a Nigerian human rights activist, storyteller, LGBTQI advocate, and social entrepreneur. He co-founded The Initiative For Equal Rights (TIERs) and served as its executive director since 2024. He is the program director for Initiative Sankofa d'Afrique de l'Ouest (ISDAO), a regional activist-led organization supporting an inclusive society free from violence and injustice through funding to local organisations.

In 2016, Makanjuola received a Queen's Young Leader Award for his work within the LGBTI+ community and was the 2012 Future Awards nominee in the Best Use of Advocacy category. Makanjuola's work has contributed immensely to the advancement of LGBTIQ rights in Nigeria. He is considered a pioneer of many initiatives, and has contributed to shifting public discussion around LGBTQI rights and issues.

== Education ==
Makanjuola is a graduate of business management from the Ogun state Institute of Technology. He also studied Strategic Project management at Anglia Ruskin University. He holds an introduction project management certificate from City University London.

== Activism ==
Makanjuola co-produced a documentary on what it means to be gay in Nigeria in 2014 just after President Goodluck Jonathan signed the same sex marriage prohibition act into law. Makanjuola also co-produced Veil of Silence, Hell or High Water, Everything in Between, We Don't Live Here Anymore and Walking with Shadows, adapted from Jude Dibia's 2006 book.

Makanjuola joined The Initiative for Equal Rights (TIERs) in October 2006 as a community volunteer and one of the founding members. He became its executive director in September 2012, serving until March 2018 when he stepped down.

He has served as an independent expert to the European Asylum Support Office and as a board member at The Equality Hub, a queer women-led organization. He has served as the executive vice-chairman of The Future Project since 2015.

In March 2019, he became the program director for Initiative Sankofa d'Afrique de l'Ouest (ISDAO), a West African philanthropic fund that is working to ensure a just and inclusive West Africa free from violence and discrimination.

== Storytelling ==
Makanjuola incorporates storytelling into his work as an LGBTQ+ rights advocate, using narrative as a tool to highlight queer experiences in Nigeria and across Africa.

He co-edited the anthologies Queer Men’s Narrative (2020) and Love Offers NO Safety: Nigeria’s Queer Men Speak (2023) with Jude Dibia, both of which document the lived experiences of queer Nigerian men.

== Awards and recognition ==
- 2012, Future Award nominee in the Best Use of Advocacy category
- 2016, YNaija PowerList for Advocacy
- 2016, Queen's Young Leader Award

== Books ==
- Queer Men's Narratives (2020)
- Love Offers No Safety (2023)
