= Wapah Ezeigwe =

Nigerian filmmaker

- Born: Nigeria
- Education: University of Nigeria, Nsukka
- Occupation: Filmmaker
- Years active: 2022–present
- Known for: Queer-themed films and LGBTQ representation in Nigerian cinema
- Notable work: Country Love; A Little Time Left

Wapah Ezeigwe is a Nigerian filmmaker known for making films that explore queer identity, love, and relationships in African societies. He is best known for writing, directing, and producing the short film Country Love (2022) and for directing A Little Time Left (2023).

== Early life and education ==
Ezeigwe studied literature at the University of Nigeria, Nsukka, where he graduated magna cum laude. He later participated in the Sundance Collab programme and the MultiChoice Talent Factory.

== Career ==
Ezeigwe's work focuses on topics such as identity, belonging, love, and community. Many of his films tell stories about queer people and their experiences in contemporary African society.

=== Country Love ===
In 2022, Ezeigwe wrote, directed, and produced Country Love, a short film about queer love and intimacy. The film was screened at several international film festivals, including Out On Film and the Vancouver Queer Film Festival.

The film received attention for its display of queer relationships in a Nigerian setting and was selected as part of a growing movement of queer African cinema.

=== A Little Time Left ===
Ezeigwe later wrote and directed A Little Time Left, a short film that explores relationships, identity, and personal connections. Production of the film was completed in 2023 and the project received coverage from arts and culture publications.

== Reception ==
Ezeigwe's work has been discussed as part of a new generation of African filmmakers increasing the visibility of LGBTQ stories in cinema.

== Filmography ==
Year	Title	Role
2022	Country Love	Writer, director and producer
2023	A Little Time Left	Writer and director
