= Country Love =

2022 Nigerian LGBTQ+ short film

- Directed by: Wapah Ezeigwe
- Written by: Wapah Ezeigwe
- Starring: Divine Ahiwe; Kelechi Michael; Uzoamaka Onuoha
- Cinematography: Victor Onwudiwe
- Production company: Pink Coffee Studios
- Release date: 10 October 2022 (2022 OUT on Film Festival)
- Running time: 45 minutes
- Country: Nigeria
- Languages: English; Igbo

Country Love is a 2022 LGBT romantic short film written and directed by Wapah Ezeigwe and produced by Pink Coffee Studios. The film screened at several international festivals, including the Out on Film festival in Atlanta and the Vancouver Queer Film Festival. The film's visual style was inspired by Dee Rees's Mudbound.

== Plot ==
Country Love follows the coming-of-age journeys of two individuals living in Nigeria amid the criminalisation and social stigma surrounding homosexuality. After leaving his village fifteen years earlier, one of the protagonists returns home at the invitation of his sister. The film explores themes of truth, identity, difficult decision-making, and queer African liberation.

== Cast ==
- Kelechi Michaels as Kambili
- Divine Ahiwe as Ifediora
- Uzoamaka Onuoha as Nneka

== Reception ==
Uzoma Ihejirika, writing for Open Country Magazine, described Country Love as a film that depicts the tenderness found within LGBTQ+ identities and relationships in Nigeria. Global Queer Cinema described Country Love as "a compelling debut from [a] Nigerian filmmaker...an evocative exploration of queer hopes and realities shaped by love, memories, and unforgiving social realities."

It was announced that an Italian-language translation of the film was in development.
