= Vagabonds! =

2022 novel by Eloghosa Osunde

Vagabonds
- First edition
- Author: Eloghosa Osunde
- Language: English
- Genre: Magical realism
- Set in: Lagos
- Publisher: Riverhead Books
- Publication date: 15 March 2022
- Publication place: Nigeria
- Pages: 304

Vagabonds! is a book of fiction by Nigerian author Eloghosa Osunde, published in 2022 by Riverhead Books. It is a compilation of short stories on topics including the patriarchy, corruption and LGBTQ life in Nigeria, in which a spirit guide named Tatafo shows readers the stories which take place in Èkó (Lagos).

== Plot ==
Vagabonds! follows the lives of several characters known as “vagabonds” as they navigate different realities in Lagos, moving between the worlds of the living and the dead. The novel explores the experiences of people who exist on the margins of society, whether because of poverty, queerness, or social invisibility, and who often come alive in the city's nocturnal spaces. It's structured as an interconnected series of stories. The book also weaves together multiple narratives, with Lagos itself functioning as a central character. Its storytelling blends myth, spirituality, and folklore with contemporary social realities.

== Reception ==
While reviewing Vagabonds! for Autostraddle, Chinelo Anyadiegwu described the novel as one that names and confronts realities that many people choose to ignore. In her review, she wrote: “The novel has many hearts, and therefore many whole parts. The music referenced in the book, for instance, is its own spirit.”

The novel received positive reviews from The New York Times and The Guardian. In its review, The Guardian described the book as an energetic debut populated by dreamers, misfits, and otherworldly figures.
