= Ìfé =

Nigerian romantic LGBT film directed by Uyai Ikpe-Etim

- Directed by: Uyaiedu Ikpe-Etim
- Written by: Uyaiedu Ikpe-Etim
- Story by: Uyai Ikpe-Etim; Pamela Adie
- Produced by: Pamela Adie
- Starring: Cindy Amadi; Uzoamaka Aniunoh
- Production company: Equality Hub Production
- Release date: October 11, 2020 (Toronto LGBT Film Festival)
- Running time: 38 minutes
- Country: Nigeria
- Languages: English; Yoruba

Ìfé, also spelt as Ife (English: Love), is a 2020 Nigerian LGBT romantic film executive-produced by prominent Nigerian LGBTQ-rights activist Pamela Adie and directed by Uyaiedu Ikpe-Etim. The film is touted to be the first full-fledged lesbian film in the history of Nollywood. However, some sources stated that it is also the first Nigerian LGBT film.

The film revolves around the lives of a same-sex women couple who also face challenges by being lesbians in Nigeria. With the release of the official trailer of the film on YouTube in July 2020, the film was expected to be released via internet possibly at the end of the year. The film raised concerns and publicity among Nigerians for the film genre coupled with the trailer reception.

== Cast ==
- Cindy Amadi as Adora
- Uzoamaka Aniunoh as Ìfé

== Production ==
The script was penned as a romantic story between two females and the project was initiated jointly by Uyai Ikpe-Etim and Pamela Adie in collaboration with the Equality Hub, an NGO which operates in Nigeria focusing on LGBT rights. The film was set to break the stereotypes faced by the Nollywood industry, which historically failed to live up to the expectations of portraying LGBTQ elements.

== Censorship ==
The film dealt with censorship issues during its production due to its genre related to LGBTQ. The film production and principal photography was not smooth for the filmmakers due to the interference of National Film and Video Censors Board, which threatened and refused to approve the film for theatrical distribution. Prior to the release of the official trailer in July 2020, it was noted that the film was not submitted by the filmmakers to the NFVCB.

The theatrical interpretation of LGBT in Nigeria is controversial. A same-sex relationship is considered a serious offense in Nigeria and a punishment of 14 years imprisonment is imposed if found guilty. The Same Sex Marriage (Prohibition) Act of 2014, passed by former President Goodluck Jonathan, outlaws same-sex marriages and LGBT.

Adedayo Thomas, the executive director of NFVCB, in an interview with CNN insisted that the Board would not approve films which promote themes and portrayal of elements that do not conform with Nigeria's values, beliefs, morals, traditions and constitution. The NFVCB also issued warnings and threats stating that it would track the LGBT filmmakers in Nollywood following the production of Ìfé.

== Release ==
Though the film was not banned officially by the NFVCB, the film was scheduled for release via online platforms instead of in theatres to avoid censorship issues and due to the uncertainties brought about by the COVID-19 pandemic in Nigeria. The filmmaker Adie revealed that the film would not be streamed on YouTube, but rather through their own platforms.

== Ife: The Sequel ==
In 2026, Ife: The Sequel was released, featuring Gbugbemi Ejeye, Ozzy Agu, Uzoamaka Aniunoh, and Adunolaoluwa Osilowo. It follows Adaora, who had been married to Dafe, as she reconnects with Ife, who is engaged to another woman, Bhewkiwe, after they cross paths in a bookstore.

== Awards ==
- Baobab Award for Best Short Film - Nominated
- Kingston Reelout Film Festival - Outstanding performance for Uzoamaka Power
