= Unoma Azuah =

Nigerian writer, author, and activist

- Born: Unoma Nguemo Azuah; 23 June 1969 (age 57); Biafra, Nigeria
- Education: Virginia Commonwealth University, Cleveland State University, University of Nigeria
- Occupations: Writer, professor, activist

Unoma Azuah (born 23 June 1969) is a Nigerian writer, author and activist whose research and activism focus on LGBT writing in Nigerian literature. She has published three books, two of which have won international awards. She focuses on issues relating to queer Nigerians, such as in Blessed Body: Secret Lives of LGBT Nigerians (2016).

== Biography ==
Azuah was born in Ogwashi-Ukwu in Delta State of Nigeria to a Tiv father from Ukan in Ushongo local government area of Benue State and to an Igbo mother from Asaba in Delta State. Being born during the Nigerian Civil War to parents on both sides of the conflict, she was raised mostly as Igbo and was estranged from her paternal family because a Tiv Nigerian soldier was not supposed to cross the enemy line to get involved with a Biafran (Igbo) woman.

She attended the University of Nigeria, Nsukka where, as an undergraduate, she edited the English department literary journal called The Muse and received the awards of the best Creative Writing student for two consecutive years: 1992 and 1993. She has a Bachelor of Art degree in English, University of Nigeria, Nsukka (1994), a Master's in English from Cleveland State University, Ohio (2001) and a Master's in Fine Art from Virginia Commonwealth University, Richmond (2003).

== Gay rights advocacy/activism ==
Azuah is the first Nigerian to give LGBTQI issues consistent visibility in the Nigerian literary scholarship. She left Nigeria in 1999, after receiving numerous threats to her life on account of her work, and now splits her time between the US and Nigeria to continue assisting and working with the Nigerian LGBTQI community.

Of her work, Azuah has said: "I’ve always explored the theme of sexuality in my writing, especially in my poems and non-fiction pieces. Edible Bones is actually inspired by a true story. The life of the major character loosely reflects the life of a Nigerian immigrant I met. He happened to be highly homophobic, but when he goes to jail and becomes a point of attention for bullies, a homosexual guy happens to be his savior."

Of the anti-gay law in Nigeria, she has also said: "I feel that the Nigerian leadership is using the matter as a tool to distract Nigerians from genuinely pressing concerns like the lack of economic opportunity and infrastructure. The strong wave of fundamentalist Christianity sweeping over Nigeria fuels the distraction of this topic which should not be up for national debate because what consenting adults do in the privacy of their bedroom should concern no one.

Her exploration of gay themes in her work, and "defense of queer sex", for a Nigerian-based writer has been described as "a courageous act indeed". Now a citizen of the USA, she continues to stay "deeply involved in her homeland by sharing stories of the persecution of the lesbian, gay, bisexual and transgender community there."

== Professional life ==
Azuah currently teaches English at the Wiregrass Georgia Technical College.

== Publications ==
- Night Songs. Lagos: Oracle, 2002. A collection of Poetry
- Sky-high Flames. Frederick, MD: Publish America. July, 2005. A novel.
- The Length of Light. Germany: VDM; Dr. Müller, 2008. A collection of short stories.
- Edible Bones. New York: Demarche Publishing, 2013. American edition. A novel.
- On Broken Wings: An Anthology of Best Contemporary Nigerian Poetry. New York: DLite, 2014.
- Blessed Body: The Secret Lives of the Nigerian Lesbian, Gay, Bisexual and Transgender: non-fiction. Jackson, TN: Cookingpotbooks, 2016
- Embracing My Shadow: Growing up lesbian in Nigeria

== Awards ==
- The Urban Spectrum National Best Novel of the year 2006 by an African born writer for Sky-high flames
- Best fiction writer of the year 2006 for Sky-high Flames, Association of Nigerian Authors/Flora Nwapa award for fiction, 2006
- The Griot Hero award for civic engagement with Adult and High school students, West Tennessee, 2008
- Nominee, Thomas Ehrlich Civically Engaged Faculty Award, Indiana University, 2009
- Aidoo-Snyder Book Award, Women’s Caucus of the African Studies Association, for Edible Bones, 2011
- Winner, Hellman-Hammett award for Sky-high Flames
