= The Initiative For Equal Rights =

Nigerian-based LGBT media monitoring group

TIERs
- Founded: 2005; 21 years ago
- Type: Non-profit
- Purpose: Discrimination and marginalization of sexual minorities
- Headquarters: Lagos, Nigeria
- Location(s): Nigeria
- Region served: Nigeria
- Method: Documentation and Monitoring, Legal Representation, Advocacy and Security Protection, and Storytelling
- Executive Director: Afolabi Aiyela
- Employees: 6-25
- Website: theinitiativeforequalrights.org

The Initiative for Equal Rights (TIERs) is a Nigeria-based registered non-for-profit organization which advocates for the rights of marginalized communities in Nigeria.

TIERs provide support and resources for sexual minorities, including conducting educational programs, workshops, and seminars related to advocacy.

The organization conducts research on issues affecting marginalized communities, producing reports and polls on issues regarding the rights and public opinion of Sexual and gender minorities. It has also documented and reported Human rights abuses in Nigeria.

== History ==
The Initiative for Equal Rights (TIERs) was founded in 2005 as a response to the Discrimination and Marginalization of Sexual and gender minorities in both HIV prevention programming, human rights protection, advocacy, and mainstream human rights work. It is based in Lagos.

== Programs ==
TIERs has partnered with Nollywood to produce films which represent Queer characters and experiences in a positive light, as most Nigerian films portray negative stereotypes of Queer character. In 2016, the organization released Hell or High Water, a short film which deals with societal expectations regarding Human sexuality in Nigeria. It sponsored the 2018 film We Don't Live Here Anymore.

TIERs has released 10 publications on issues concerning human rights, sexuality and gender orientation, violence, social rights and cultural relativism.

== See also ==
- Olumide Makanjuola, former director of TIERs
- List of LGBT rights organizations
- Violence against LGBT people
- Trans Media Watch
- All About Trans
- Emmanuella David-Ette, director of Dynamic Initiative for Healthcare & Human Rights, collaborator with TIER
