= Jude Dibia =

Nigerian writer

Jude Dibia (born 5 January 1975 in Lagos, Nigeria) is a Nigerian novelist. In 2007, he won the Ken Saro-Wiwa Prize for Prose for his novel Unbridled. He has been shortlisted for awards such as Nigeria Prize for Literature, the Commonwealth Prize and the Swedish Natur och Kultur Pris.

== Education ==
Dibia studied at the University of Ibadan, and earned a B.A. in Modern European Languages (German).

== Career ==
Jude's novels have been described as daring and controversial by readers and critics in and out of Africa. Walking with Shadows is said to be the first Nigerian novel that has a gay man as its central character and treats his experience as a positive and great insight, inviting a positive response to his situation. Unbridled, too, stirred some controversy on its publication; it is a story that tackles the emancipation of its female protagonist, who had suffered incest and various abuse from men.

Dibia's short stories have appeared on various online literary sites, including AfricanWriter.com and Halftribe.com. One of his short stories is included in the anthology One World: A global anthology of short stories, alongside stories by such critically acclaimed writers as Chimamanda Ngozi Adichie and Jhumpa Lahiri.

=== Academic analysis of Jude Dibia's writings ===
- Sesan, Azeez Akinwumi. Sexuality, Morality and Identity Construction in Jude Dibia's Walking with Shadows. Ibadan Journal of English Studies 7 (2018): 453–468.
- Sotunsa, Ebunoluwa Mobolanle & Festus Alabi. The Portrayal of Homosexuality in Jude Dibia's Walking with Shadows. Ibadan Journal of English Studies 7 (2018):437-452.
- Olalemi, Oluwatimilehin Josiah. Culture Shock In Jude Idibia's Unbridled and Amma Darko's Beyond the Horizon. Academia.edu (2019): 1 - 58
- Raz Ion. The Quiet Radicalism of the African Literary Icon Jude Dibia. Gay45 (2025)

== Award ==
- Winner for the 2007 Ken Saro-Wiwa Prize for Prose for Unbridled
- Finalist for the 2007 Nigeria Prize for Literature award for Unbridled
- Recipient of the Natur och Kultur Priz 2016

== Works ==
- Walking with Shadows (BlackSands Books, 2005)
- Among Strangers (Short Story/2007)
- Unbridled (2007)
- Blackbird (2011).
