= Same-sex marriage in Alberta =

Same-sex marriage has been legal in Alberta since July 20, 2005 upon the granting of royal assent to the federal Civil Marriage Act. Alberta was one of the four Canadian provinces and territories where same-sex marriage had not been legalised before the enactment of the federal law, along with Prince Edward Island, the Northwest Territories and Nunavut.

Alberta has also recognised a form of domestic partnership known as "adult interdependent relationships" offering some of the rights and benefits of marriage since 2003.

== Adult interdependent relationships ==
Since 2003, same-sex couples have had access to adult interdependent relationships, providing some of the rights and benefits of marriage. This includes alimony, health care benefits, inheritance and domestic violence protections, among others. The Adult Interdependent Relationships Act was enacted by the Legislative Assembly of Alberta on 3 December 2002, assented by Lieutenant Governor Lois Hole the following day, and went into effect on 1 June 2003. MLA Brian Mason spoke in favour of the legislation on the Assembly floor, stating:

We're supporting the Adult Interdependent Relationships Act because at long last people in same-sex relationships will have equal access to the laws of this province. These laws impose obligations as well as confer rights. Whether we're talking about employment benefits, pensions, or family law, same-sex couples will at long last have the same rights and obligations as opposite-sex couples.

== Civil Marriage Act ==
On June 28, 2005, the House of Commons of Canada passed the Civil Marriage Act, an act which defines Canadian civil marriage as a union between "two persons". The bill received royal assent by Deputy Governor General Beverley McLachlin a few weeks later and went into effect on July 20, 2005. Premier Ralph Klein responded by saying that the Alberta Government might opt to stop solemnizing marriages entirely, suggesting that in its place, the government would issue civil union licences to both opposite-sex and same-sex couples. Religious groups could still solemnize opposite-sex unions as marriages, but any civil ceremony would be permitted to recognize only a civil union. The Alberta Government also considered continuing to issue marriage licences to opposite-sex couples only in court, on the grounds that the federal government's legislation encroached on the provincial government's jurisdiction over the solemnization of marriage. In December 2004, Klein had suggested conducting a nationwide referendum on the legalisation of same-sex marriage, but this was opposed by Prime Minister Paul Martin, saying that "this is an issue that Parliamentarians ought to decide". Klein stated, "In this province, my feeling is the majority -- and I don't know what the percentage of the majority is -- but the majority of people are opposed to same-sex marriage. And I represent the people of this province."

On July 12, 2005, Klein conceded that the advice given to him by legal experts was that a challenge in court to refuse to marry same-sex couples had "no chance", and wasting taxpayers' money to fight it would be "giving false hope". Klein said, "much to our chagrin", the Alberta Government would issue marriage licences to same-sex couples when the bill received royal assent. Klein also said that the Alberta Government would enact provincial legislation to protect religious and civil officials who do not wish to perform a same-sex marriage. This would have meant that an Alberta marriage commissioner who refused to solemnize same-sex marriages would not be liable for dismissal on those grounds. However, no such legislation was passed, indicative of the "sea change" in attitudes towards same-sex marriage in Alberta. This mirrored similar developments in the neighbouring province of Saskatchewan where courts twice struck down attempts to exempt marriage commissioners from performing same-sex weddings.

The first same-sex couple to receive a marriage licence in Alberta were Keenan Carley and Robert Bradford in Edmonton just hours after the federal law received royal assent on July 20. The couple had to wait until provincial officials instructed all registry offices to issue marriage licences to same-sex couples, and until the licence forms were updated to replace "Bride" and "Groom" with "Partner 1" and "Partner 2". The couple said, "It's wonderful feeling to know that it can finally be official. [...] It means that when we do have that ceremony, it will be legal, that we will be recognized as a married couple by the province of Alberta and the government of Canada. And that's a great thing."

== Provincial legislation ==
The position of Premier Ralph Klein and the Progressive Conservative government had been to attempt to block same-sex marriages in Alberta should a court case require it or federal legislation pass it nationwide. On March 16, 2000, the Legislative Assembly passed Bill 202, which amended the provincial Marriage Act to include a heterosexual-only definition of marriage. The bill also invoked the Notwithstanding Clause of the Canadian Charter of Rights and Freedoms. This insulated the Marriage Act from any legal challenge based on violation of Charter rights, including the Section 15 equality guarantees. Under the terms of the Notwithstanding Clause, such a declaration is effective for only five years after coming into force. For the Marriage Act, this period expired on March 23, 2005. Premier Klein sent mixed messages about whether it would be renewed; ultimately, it was not. The Minister of Government Services, Ty Lund, tabled a report at the conservative caucus on April 4, 2005, stating that the federal government, not the provinces, has the exclusive jurisdiction to define marriage. The report further stated that if Alberta renewed the declaration in the act by using the Notwithstanding Clause, the "government would be needlessly wasting time and money".

While the act could not have been challenged under the Charter, the definition of marriage is outside the power of the provincial government, or ultra vires, and therefore invalid. The Constitution Act, 1867 is universally interpreted as giving provinces jurisdiction over only the solemnization of marriage, while all other aspects, including capacity to marry, are under federal jurisdiction. At the time Bill 202 was passed, Justice Minister Dave Hancock did not support it, saying: "In terms of legal effect, I'm convinced it doesn't have any." Hancock subsequently stated that he believed the act to be constitutionally valid and that Alberta would attempt to uphold it. Following the December 9, 2004 Supreme Court response to the federal reference of same-sex marriage, Hancock's successor, Ron Stevens, conceded that the amendments to the Marriage Act would likely be struck down as unconstitutional on account of its encroachment into what had by then been explicitly ruled a matter of federal jurisdiction. In December 2004, Canadians for Equal Marriage said they were considering filing a court challenge to legalise same-sex marriage in Alberta, similar to what had happened in other provinces and territories, "The essence of the challenge is going to be discrimination based on sexual orientation. They suggest marriage continues to be between a man and a woman, when the Supreme Court and other jurisdictions have stated very clearly otherwise." Michael Phair, a member of the Edmonton City Council, said, "We are tired of being bullied. It is an outrage, and it is nothing but bias and revenge to force us to go to the courts to get what everyone else has in this country."

On 7 May 2014, the Legislative Assembly amended the Marriage Act to remove the 2000 amendments and to replace all references to "husband and wife" with the gender-neutral term "spouses", nine years after same-sex marriage became legal in Alberta. Several other acts were amended in a similar way. The legislation received royal assent by Lieutenant Governor Donald Ethell on 14 May. Section 8 of the act states that each of the parties shall, in the presence of the marriage commissioner and the witnesses, declare:

I call on those persons present to witness that I,______________, do take you,______________, to be my lawful wedded wife (or husband, or spouse). [RSA 2000, c M‑5, s 8(2)]

== First Nations ==
While the Indian Act (French: Loi sur les Indiens; Cree: ᓀᐦᐃᔭᐤ ᐏᔭᓯᐍᐏᐣ, Nêhiyaw Wiyasiwêwin; Blackfoot: ᓴᑲᖽᒧᐧᒣᑯ ᖳᖿᖽᐦᒧᐧᒉᐡ, Sopokíítsitapii Akákihtsimaan; Nakoda: Rheyam Ogichûṯẖe) governs many aspects of life for First Nations in Canada, it does not directly govern marriage or provide a framework for conducting customary marriages. Instead, marriage laws are primarily governed by provincial and territorial legislation. However, the Indian Act has some indirect impacts on marriage, particularly regarding band membership and property rights on reserves.

While there are no records of same-sex marriages being performed in First Nations cultures in the way they are commonly defined in Western legal systems, many Indigenous communities recognize identities and relationships that may be placed on the LGBT spectrum. Among these are two-spirit individuals—people who embody both masculine and feminine qualities. In some cultures, two-spirit individuals assigned male at birth wear women's clothing and engage in household and artistic work associated with the feminine sphere. Historically, this identity sometimes allowed for unions between two people of the same biological sex. Among the Plains Cree people, two-spirit individuals—known as iyîhkwêw (ᐃᔩᐦᑫᐧᐤ, pronounced [ˈɪ.jiːhˌkweːw])—are regarded as "esteemed persons with special spiritual powers" and are "noted shamans". It was likely that they were able to marry cisgender men, though David G. Mandelbaum reported in 1940 that an iyîhkwêw named Clawed Woman had remained unmarried her entire life. The Nakoda refer to two-spirit people who carried out women's work in the community and married men as wîyâkte (pronounced [ˈwĩ.jãkte]). In the Blackfoot language, they are known as ááwowáakii (ᖳᖶᖷᖽ, pronounced [áːwowâːki]).

== Marriage statistics ==
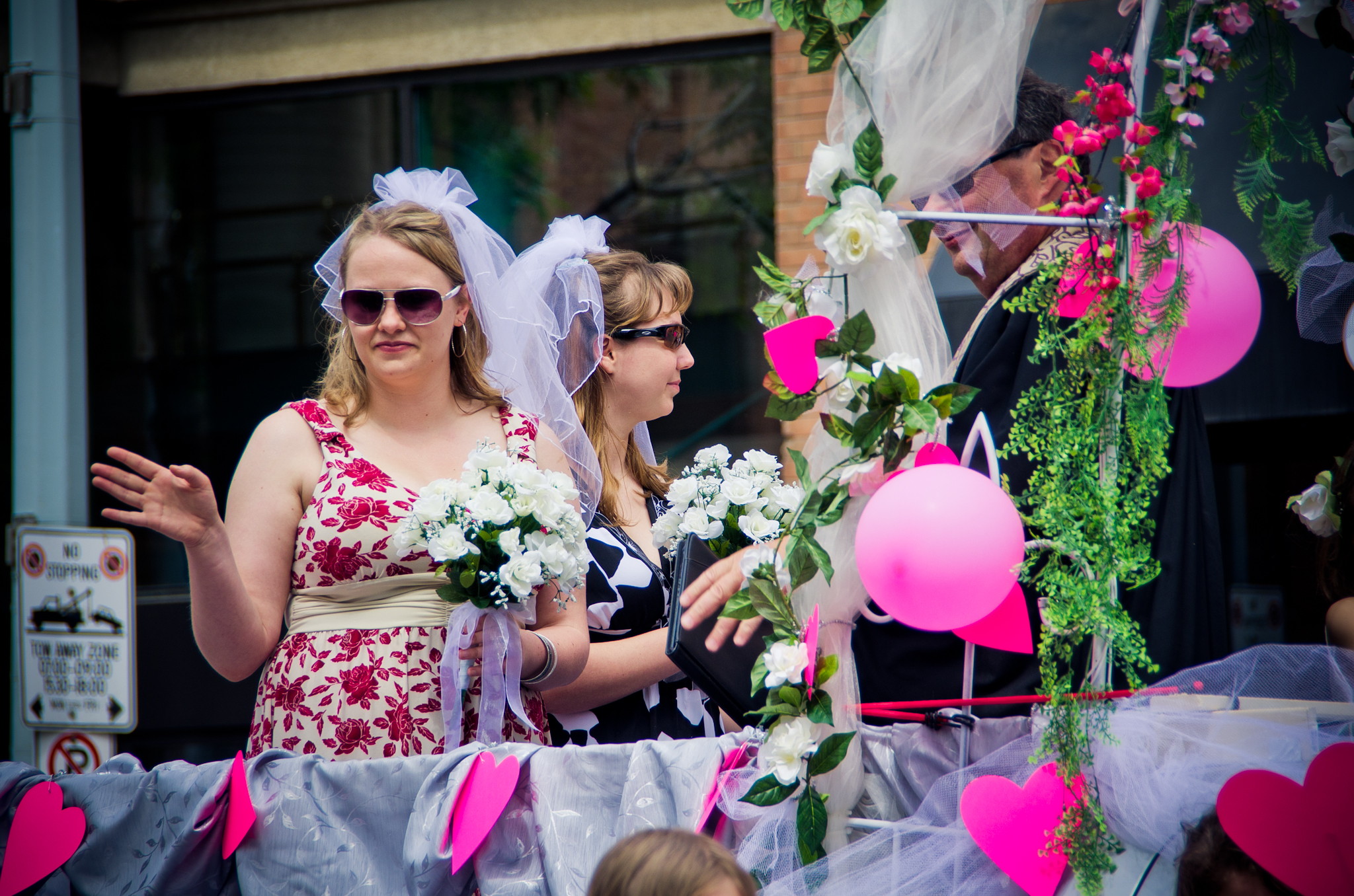
A married lesbian couple at Edmonton Pride, 2011

2,485 same-sex couples married in Alberta from 2005 to 2014. The 2016 Canadian census showed that there were 6,110 same-sex couples living in Alberta.

== Religious performance ==
In July 2019, the synod of the Anglican Church of Canada passed a resolution known as "A Word to the Church", allowing its dioceses to choose whether to bless and perform same-sex marriages. A few days after the vote, Bishop Jane Alexander issued a pastoral letter authorising clergy in the Diocese of Edmonton to officiate at same-sex marriages. The measure includes a freedom of conscience clause for clergy opposed to performing the marriages. The Diocese of Calgary does not perform same-sex marriages. In October 2017, the diocesan synod voted by a 57.4% majority to request that Bishop Greg Kerr-Wilson permit parishes to bless civil same-sex marriages, but the diocese still does not bless or perform same-sex marriages as of 2024. The Diocese of Athabasca, encompassing northern Alberta, likewise does not perform same-sex marriages.

Some other religious organisations also perform same-sex marriages in their places of worship, including the United Church of Canada, Quakers, the Evangelical Lutheran Church in Canada, and the Canadian Unitarian Council.

== Public opinion ==
An EKOS/CBC poll in 2002 indicated that attitudes towards same-sex marriage were more supportive in Alberta than they were in the provinces of Manitoba and Saskatchewan, both of which had recognized same-sex marriage earlier. A June 2003 survey by Ipsos-Reid, conducted a few weeks after same-sex marriage was legalized in Ontario, showed that 57% of Albertans opposed same-sex marriage, while 41% supported it. Opposition was higher among older people (77%) than middle-aged people (60%) and younger people (41%), higher among men (63%) than women (51%), and higher among people living in rural areas (65%) than people living in urban areas (45%). An Ipsos-Reid poll conducted in August 2005 showed that 56% of Albertans remained opposed to same-sex marriage.

An October 2011 poll conducted by the Citizen Society Research Lab at Lethbridge College found that 72.1% of Albertans supported same-sex marriage, while 27.9% were opposed, a big change in comparison to 2005 when a majority of residents opposed it.

== See also ==
- Same-sex marriage in Canada
- LGBT rights in Canada
