= Unregistered cohabitation =

Legal status in some jurisdictions

Unregistered cohabitation is a legal status (sometimes de facto) given to same-sex or opposite-sex couples in certain jurisdictions. They may be similar to common-law marriages.

More specifically, unregistered cohabitation may refer to:

- Unregistered cohabitation in Australia and De facto relationships in Australia (Note: Also recognizes another form of same-sex unions (marriage, civil unions, domestic partnerships).)
  - Domestic relationships and domestic partnerships in the Australian Capital Territory
  - Domestic relationships in New South Wales
  - De facto unions in the Northern Territory
  - De facto unions in Norfolk Island
  - De facto relationships in Queensland
  - Close personal relationships in South Australia
  - Personal relationships in Tasmania
  - (Victoria (state)) Domestic relationships in Victoria
  - De facto unions in Western Australia
- Various de facto relationships in Canada
  - Adult interdependent relationship in Alberta
  - Common-law relationships in Manitoba
  - Domestic partnership in Nova Scotia
  - Civil unions and de facto relationships in Quebec
- De facto unions in Colombia
- Unregistered cohabitation in Croatia
- Unregistered cohabitation in Israel
- Samenlevingscontract in the Netherlands
- De facto relationships in New Zealand
- Unregistered cohabitation in Poland
- Unregistered cohabitation in San Marino
- Unregistered cohabitation in Spain

Some other countries and sub-national regions recognize unregistered cohabitation, as listed in the Civil union article.

== See also ==
- Common-law marriage
