= Same-sex marriage in Saskatchewan =

Same-sex marriage has been legal in Saskatchewan since November 5, 2004 as a result of a decision of the Family Law Division of the Saskatchewan Court of Queen's Bench. This decision followed similar cases in six other provinces and territories, and pre-dated by eight months the federal Civil Marriage Act of 2005, which made same-sex marriage available throughout Canada. Later court decisions have dealt with the issue of marriage commissioners who object to performing same-sex marriages on the basis of their religious beliefs.

Saskatchewan was the seventh jurisdiction in Canada, and the tenth in the world after the Netherlands, Belgium, Ontario, British Columbia, Quebec, Massachusetts, Yukon, Manitoba and Nova Scotia, to legalise same-sex marriage.

== Court cases ==
=== N.W. v. Canada (Attorney General) ===
In the fall of 2004, five same-sex couples brought an application, N.W. v. Canada (Attorney General), in the Family Law Division of the Saskatchewan Court of Queen's Bench, seeking a judgment requiring marriage licence issuers appointed by the provincial government to issue marriage licences to same-sex couples. The application was based on the argument that the traditional common-law definition of marriage discriminated against same-sex couples on the basis of sexual orientation, contrary to the equality clause of the Canadian Charter of Rights and Freedoms. At the time of the application, courts in six other Canadian provinces and territories had upheld the constitutionality of same-sex marriage in Canada. The application named as parties both the Attorney General of Canada, Irwin Cotler, and the Attorney General of Saskatchewan, Frank Quennell. Both the federal and provincial governments were parties; the former because the substantive law governing the definition of marriage is a matter of federal jurisdiction under the Constitution Act, 1867, and the latter because marriage licence issuers are provincial officials appointed under Saskatchewan's marriage legislation. Quennell had already stated in September 2004 that he would not oppose such a court bid. The Green Party of Saskatchewan supported the couples, and issued a statement supporting same-sex marriage rights in April 2004, "Giving same sex couples the same range of choices as opposite sex couples is a simple question of fairness and human dignity. Either this government supports equality or it does not."

On 3 November 2004, the five couples appeared before Justice Donna Wilson on the application. Neither the federal nor the provincial governments challenged the suit. Greg Walen, lawyer for one of the couples, had filed a statement of claim seeking a declaratory judgment that the common-law definition of marriage be changed to include the wording "two people to the exclusion of others", rather than "two people of the opposite sex". On 5 November, Justice Wilson ruled that the common-law opposite-sex definition of marriage violated the equality rights of same-sex couples under the Charter, and that "the common-law definition of marriage for civil purposes is declared to be 'the lawful union of two persons to the exclusion of all others.'" Justice Wilson also ordered the federal and provincial attorneys general to pay court costs to the applicants, on a solicitor-client basis, fixed at a total of $10,000, divided evenly between the two governments. Wilson wrote in her ruling:

The common law definition of marriage for civil purposes is declared to be "the lawful union of two persons to the exclusion of all others" and civil marriage between two persons of the same sex, who otherwise meet the substantive and procedural requirements of the federal law governing capacity to marry, and whose applications otherwise meet the procedural requirements of The Marriage Act, 1995 is declared to be a lawful and valid marriage in Saskatchewan. It is further declared that a refusal to issue marriage licences to the applicants subsequent to this order on the sole basis of their sexual orientation constitutes a breach of the applicants' rights as guaranteed under section 15(1) of the Canadian Charter of Rights and Freedoms ("the Charter"), such breach not being a reasonable limit on those rights within the meaning of section 1 of the Charter.

Walen of the Saskatoon law firm Scharfstein, Gibbings, Walen, & Fisher issued a statement following the court ruling that "[t]he judge found that it is unconstitutional to exclude same-sex couples from civil marriage and changed the law to include them. The judge agreed with the Ontario Court of Appeal that 'the dignity of persons in same-sex relationships is violated by the exclusion of same-sex couples from the institution of marriage'....The judge agreed with the Yukon court that the province had a choice whether or not to issue marriage licenses to same-sex couples, and it chose not to. As a result, costs were awarded on an increased scale against both the province and the federal government." Spokespeople for Canadians for Equal Marriage, Egale Canada and the Saskatchewan Federation of Labour welcomed the court decision. James Hein-Blackmore, a plaintiff in the case, said, "What this means to me is peace of mind. The day we were married was a great day of happiness as we professed our love to one another. But not having our marriage recognized here in Saskatchewan was a great burden. Now I know that no matter what happens in our lives or our health, I can rest assured that my husband will have all the legal rights to handle things the way we want them." Attorney General Quennell said he would not appeal the decision.

=== M.J. v. Nichols ===
In 2005, Orville Nichols, a 30-year marriage commissioner and devout Baptist, refused to marry a same-sex couple because it conflicted with his religious beliefs. The couple filed a complaint under the Saskatchewan Human Rights Code that "Mr. Nichols refused to perform a marriage on the basis of the prohibited ground of sexual orientation." The Saskatchewan Human Rights Tribunal ordered Nichols, in M.J. v. Nichols, to pay $2,500 in compensation for infringing the couple's right to access public services without discrimination. In 2009, the Saskatchewan Court of Queen's Bench dismissed Nichols' appeal.

The Saskatchewan Government followed by proposing legislation which would have allowed marriage commissioners to refuse for this reason. In January 2011, on a reference question, the Saskatchewan Court of Appeal ruled that such a law would be unconstitutional. It was estimated at the time that about 1% of the existing marriage commissioners would resign due to their unwillingness to issue licences to same-sex couples. Provincial law permits religious bodies and officials—but not marriage commissioners—to refuse to perform marriages for religious reasons.

== Provincial legislation ==
The Constitution Act, 1867 (French: Loi constitutionnelle de 1867; Cree: ᐅᐢᑌᓯᒫᐓᔭᓯᐍᐏᐣ, Ostêsimâwoyasiwêwin; Chipewyan: Nı̨h k’e Sehoɂą Yatı Nedhe; Ojibwe: Gichi-Onaakonigewin; Dakota: Wowapi Sutaya Woope) is universally interpreted as giving provinces jurisdiction over only the solemnization of marriage, while all other aspects, including capacity to marry, are under federal jurisdiction. On this basis, the Parliament of Canada can legislate on the substantive law of marriage, as it did in 2005 with the Civil Marriage Act. Of Saskatchewan's 14 representatives in the House of Commons of Canada, only one—Ralph Goodale, Liberal MP for Wascana—voted in favour of the Civil Marriage Act.

In 2001, the Saskatchewan Legislature passed two statutes, the Miscellaneous Statutes (Domestic Relations) Amendment Act, 2001, and the Miscellaneous Statutes (Domestic Relations) Amendment Act, 2001 (No. 2), which changed the definition of "spouse" in 24 provincial laws to treat same-sex couples equally to opposite-sex couples. The changes included the areas of adoption, spousal support, inheritance rights, pensions and property rights. This meant that same-sex couples were granted the right to adopt children jointly. The two acts received royal assent by Lieutenant Governor Lynda Haverstock on 6 July 2001. On 3 May 2021, the Saskatchewan Legislature repealed the Marriage Act, 1995, which required marriage commissioners to pronounce a newlywed couple as "husband and wife", and enacted in its stead the Marriage Act, 2021. The new law, which received royal assent by Lieutenant Governor Russell Mirasty on 13 May, uses gender-neutral language with regard to married spouses. The act states that each of the parties shall, in the presence of the marriage commissioner and the witnesses, declare:

I call on these persons here present to witness that I, A.B., do take you, C.D., to be my lawful wedded spouse. [SS 2021, c 16, s 5-9(2)(b)]

== First Nations ==
While the Indian Act governs many aspects of life for First Nations in Canada, it does not directly govern marriage or provide a framework for conducting customary marriages. Instead, marriage laws are primarily governed by provincial and territorial legislation. However, the Indian Act has some indirect impacts on marriage, particularly regarding band membership and property rights on reserves.

While there are no records of same-sex marriages being performed in First Nations cultures in the way they are commonly defined in Western legal systems, many Indigenous communities recognize identities and relationships that may be placed on the LGBT spectrum. Among these are two-spirit individuals—people who embody both masculine and feminine qualities. In some cultures, two-spirit individuals assigned male at birth wear women's clothing and engage in household and artistic work associated with the feminine sphere. Historically, this identity sometimes allowed for unions between two people of the same biological sex. Among the Plains Cree people, two-spirit individuals—known as iyîhkwêw (ᐃᔩᐦᑫᐧᐤ, pronounced [ˈɪ.jiːhˌkweːw])—are regarded as "esteemed persons with special spiritual powers" and are "noted shamans". It was likely that they were able to marry cisgender men, though David G. Mandelbaum reported in 1940 that an iyîhkwêw named Clawed Woman had remained unmarried her entire life. The Ojibwe refer to two-spirit people as niizh manidoowag (pronounced [niːʒ maˈnɪˌdoːˌwak]), a term that inspired the modern umbrella term "two-spirit". Many niizh manidoowag were wives in polygynous households. They are known as wiŋkta (pronounced [ˈwĩkta]) in the Dakota language. Many wiŋkta married cisgender men without indication of polygyny, but some remained unmarried and lived in their own tipis, and were visited by married men for sexual intercourse when the men's wives were pregnant or menstruating, and therefore when sexual intercourse was forbidden to them.

== Marriage statistics ==
The 2016 Canadian census showed that there were 1,070 same-sex couples living in Saskatchewan.

The first same-sex marriage in La Loche in the Clearwater River Dene Nation was performed in summer 2018 for a Chipewyan two-spirit couple.

== Religious performance ==
In July 2019, the synod of the Anglican Church of Canada passed a resolution known as "A Word to the Church", allowing its dioceses to choose whether to bless and perform same-sex marriages. Following the vote, the Diocese of Saskatoon announced that its clergy would be permitted to solemnise same-sex marriages. Same-sex marriages are not performed in the Diocese of Qu'Appelle, which encompasses the southern third of Saskatchewan. The marriage canon of the Anglican Church of Canada serves as the canon on marriage in the diocese. The Diocese of Saskatchewan likewise does not perform same-sex marriages.

Some other religious organisations also perform same-sex marriages in their places of worship, including the United Church of Canada, Quakers, the Evangelical Lutheran Church in Canada, and the Canadian Unitarian Council. A same-sex couple was married on December 31, 2014 in a Mennonite congregation in Saskatoon, the first same-sex marriage in the Mennonite Church Canada.

== See also ==
- Same-sex marriage in Canada
- LGBT rights in Canada
