= Same-sex marriage in Nova Scotia =

Same-sex marriage has been legal in Nova Scotia since September 24, 2004 when the province began issuing marriage licences to same-sex couples immediately following a court ruling from the Nova Scotia Supreme Court. Nova Scotia was the sixth jurisdiction in Canada and the ninth in the world, after the Netherlands, Belgium, Ontario, British Columbia, Quebec, Massachusetts, Yukon and Manitoba, to legalise same-sex marriage.

Nova Scotia has also recognised domestic partnerships offering some of the rights and benefits of marriage since 4 June 2001.

== Domestic partnerships ==
On 30 November 2000, the Nova Scotia House of Assembly approved the Law Reform (2000) Act, (Note: The long title of the Act is An Act to Comply with Certain Court Decisions and to Modernize and Reform Laws in the Province.) which legalised domestic partnerships, by a 43–2 vote. The law was assented by Lieutenant Governor Myra Freeman, and went into force on June 4, 2001. Domestic partnerships grant cohabiting couples many of the rights and obligations of marriage, including pension benefits, inheritance and the ability to divide property or other assets at separation or death. These partnerships differ from common law marriages in that they are registered with the state and the property rights of domestic partners are better defined. Both partners must be 19 or older, resident in Nova Scotia for the past 3 months, and not currently married or in a partnership with another individual. Both opposite-sex and same-sex couples can enter into a domestic partnership.

30 November 2000 vote in the House of Assembly
Party	Voted for	Voted against	Absent (Did not vote)
Progressive Conservative Party	23: Muriel Baillie; Gordon Balser; Michael Baker; Barry Barnet; Frank Chipman; Ron Chisholm; Peter Christie; James DeWolfe; Bill Dooks; Ernie Fage; David Hendsbee; Richard Hurlburt; Bill Langille; Neil LeBlanc; Rodney MacDonald; Angus MacIsaac; Mary Ann McGrath; Kerry Morash; David Morse; Jamie Muir; Tim Olive; Mark Parent; Ron Russell	2: Jon Carey; Cecil O'Donnell	4: John Chataway; John Hamm; Jane Purves; Brooke Taylor
Nova Scotia Liberal Party	10: Brian Boudreau; Don Downe; Wayne Gaudet; Kennie MacAskill; Manning MacDonald; Paul MacEwan; Russell MacKinnon; Michel Samson; Jim Smith; Dave Wilson	–	1: Russell MacLellan
Nova Scotia New Democratic Party	10: Robert Chisolm; Frank Corbett; Kevin Deveaux; Darrell Dexter; Howard Epstein; Bill Estabrooks; John Holm; Maureen MacDonald; John MacDonell; Jerry Pye	–	1: Eileen O'Connell
Total (Note: The Speaker of the Nova Scotia House of Assembly, Murray Scott, votes only in case of a tied vote.)	43	2	7
Total	84.3%	3.9%	11.8%

The passage of the domestic partnership legislation had followed a report by the Law Reform Commission of Nova Scotia in April 1996 that recommended changes to provincial family law. The Commission recommended modifications to the Matrimonial Property Act; "[t]he Matrimonial Property Act had been passed in 1980 as part of a general reform movement across Canada responding to an increase in the divorce rate (once divorce became easier to obtain) and the perceived unfairness under the earlier system of property division on the ending of a marriage. The Matrimonial Property Act has not been altered since 1980." It suggested the passage of a new Family Law Act which would guarantee equal division of family property between spouses and equitable sharing of responsibility for children, as well as recognize a diversity of family forms, including same-sex couples. It wrote in its report:

The Family Law Act should be available to married couples and to opposite sex and same sex couples in cohabitation relationships.

In July 2001, the Nova Scotia Supreme Court concluded that the provision in the Adoption Act that prevented common-law couples from adopting was unconstitutional. The ruling legalized adoption by same-sex and opposite-sex common-law couples. Madame Justice Deborah Gass ruled that "prohibiting a joint adoption where all the evidence indicates these adults are providing optimum care and loving ... defeats the very purpose of the legislation". A spokeswoman for Egale Canada said, "It really is a victory for the expansion of the definition of family and that courts recognize families exist beyond married couples and their children."

== Court ruling ==
Following the court ruling legalizing same-sex marriage in Yukon in July 2004, Sean Foreman, the chairperson of a local LGBT group, said, "We are now considering a change in strategy, to proceed with a similar application in Nova Scotia in the near future, rather than wait for the Reference." Foreman also asked the federal and provincial attorneys general, Irwin Cotler and Michael Baker, to "immediately begin issuing marriage licenses to same-sex couples". On August 13, 2004, three same-sex couples brought the suit Boutilier v. Nova Scotia (Attorney General) against the provincial and federal governments requesting that they be issued marriage licences. The partners who brought the suit were Brian Mombourquette and Ross Boutilier, Kim Vance and Samantha Meehan (who had married in Toronto in 2003 and sought recognition of their marriage at home in Nova Scotia), and Ron and Bryan Garnett-Doucette. The couples were represented by Foreman, also a lawyer at the law firm Wickwire Holm in Halifax. Premier John Hamm said the provincial government would not oppose the court bid.

On September 24, 2004, Justice Heather Robertson of the Nova Scotia Supreme Court ruled that the same-sex marriage ban violated the Canadian Charter of Rights and Freedoms and ordered the province to recognize same-sex unions. Ron and Bryan Garnett-Doucette were the first same-sex couple to obtain a marriage licence in Nova Scotia, receiving a licence in Halifax just hours after the ruling was handed down. They said, "We feel really, really good. It's a great day to be a Nova Scotian." The federal and provincial governments did not oppose the ruling, continuing the trend set with the Yukon and Manitoba rulings. Attorney General Baker said, "We certainly did not want to waste taxpayers' money", and Premier Hamm said the province would abide by the court's decision. Leader of the Opposition Darrell Dexter praised the court ruling. Terrence Prendergast, the Archbishop of Halifax, condemned the court decision, stating that "marriage is a natural institution that precedes all social, legal and religious systems", "We must recognize this decision as the end of state support for marriage as we have always known it."

== Provincial legislation ==
An odd proviso to the post-ruling status was that, until a formal change to the provincial Solemnization of Marriage Act, the Minister of Justice still required the terms "husband and wife" to be used by justices of the peace in any wedding. This stance by the Justice Ministry was categorised by some as heterosexist. Shortly afterwards, following warnings of further legal action by the couples' lawyer, the policy was changed to remove that requirement. The Solemnization of Marriage Act (French: Loi sur le mariage; Mi'kmaq: Malie'wuti Tplutaqan; Scottish Gaelic: Achd a' Pòsaidh), however, was not modified to this effect. In October 2017, the House of Assembly approved a bill replacing references to "husband and wife" with the gender-neutral term "spouses". It passed its third reading on 20 October and received royal assent by Lieutenant Governor Arthur LeBlanc six days later.

== First Nations ==
While the Indian Act (French: Loi sur les Indiens; Mi'kmaq: Inu Tplutaqan; Scottish Gaelic: Achd Innseanach) governs many aspects of life for First Nations in Canada, it does not directly govern marriage or provide a framework for conducting customary marriages. Instead, marriage laws are primarily governed by provincial and territorial legislation. However, the Indian Act has some indirect impacts on marriage, particularly regarding band membership and property rights on reserves. First Nations have deep-rooted marriage traditions, placing a strong emphasis on community, family and spiritual connections. For example, customary Mi'kmaq marriages (malie'wuti) incorporate spiritual practices such as smudging and honour songs, along with feasting and traditional dances "binding the human, natural, and Supernatural Beings of our world". Marriages were exogamous and matrilineal, with bride service also required and polygyny being acceptable. Same-sex unions are not explicitly prohibited by traditional Indigenous law.

While there are no records of same-sex marriages being performed in First Nations cultures in the way they are commonly defined in Western legal systems, many Indigenous communities recognize identities and relationships that may be placed on the LGBT spectrum. Among these are two-spirit individuals—people who embody both masculine and feminine qualities. In some cultures, two-spirit individuals assigned male at birth wear women's clothing and engage in household and artistic work associated with the feminine sphere. Historically, this identity sometimes allowed for unions between two people of the same biological sex. The Mi'kmaq refer to two-spirit individuals as etuiwijijaqmijuinu'k. They held various important spiritual and community roles, including as helpers and knowledge-keepers.

== Marriage statistics ==
The 2016 Canadian census showed that there were 2,250 same-sex couples living in Nova Scotia. 126 same-sex marriages were solemnised in the province in 2017, accounting for 3% of all marriages, with 87 (69%) of these being between lesbian couples.

== Religious performance ==
In July 2019, the synod of the Anglican Church of Canada passed a resolution known as "A Word to the Church", allowing its dioceses to choose whether to bless and perform same-sex marriages. In September of the same year, Bishop Ron Cutler of the Diocese of Nova Scotia and Prince Edward Island issued a pastoral letter allowing local parishes to perform same-sex marriages.

Some other religious organisations also perform same-sex marriages in their places of worship, including the United Church of Canada, Quakers, the Evangelical Lutheran Church in Canada, and the Canadian Unitarian Council. The First Baptist Church in Halifax also performs same-sex marriages, and in April 2023 ordained its first married lesbian minister.

== See also ==
- Same-sex marriage in Canada
- LGBT rights in Canada
- Domestic partnership in Nova Scotia
