= Same-sex marriage in Prince Edward Island =

Same-sex marriage has been legal in Prince Edward Island since July 20, 2005. The province began updating its laws to recognize same-sex marriage after the passage of the Civil Marriage Act in the House of Commons of Canada in July 2005. Prince Edward Island had been one of only four provinces and territories, with Alberta, the Northwest Territories and Nunavut, where same-sex marriage had not already been legalized by court challenges prior to the passage of the federal law.

== Background ==
On December 10, 2004, Premier Pat Binns said that his government would wait for federal legislation to resolve the issue of same-sex marriage. It is unclear how Binns would have reacted if a provincial court had found the heterosexual definition of marriage in violation of the Charter rights of gays and lesbians. A spokeswoman for a local LGBT group said in June 2005 that the province should legalize same-sex marriage "right away", noting that the island often lagged behind the rest of Canada on the issue of LGBT rights, "It's also sad to think in a province that could actually lead, on this particular issue, that they choose to stand by and wait for the federal government to make the decision. Thereby not having anyone in government make the commitment to these human rights issues."

== Civil Marriage Act ==
After the House of Commons of Canada passed the Civil Marriage Act in June 2005, provincial Attorney General Mildred Dover announced that the province would bring provincial legislation in line with the law, "We have said all along that we would comply if the federal government passed same-sex legislation. They have the power to define marriage. We're looking at the possibility of bringing in an omnibus bill that would say something to the effect of wherever the word spouse appears in our legislation, it includes same-sex and heterosexual marriages." The act passed through the Canadian Senate on July 19 and received royal assent the next day on July 20, 2005, extending same-sex marriage rights across all of Canada.

However, Dover announced that marriage licences would not be issued to same-sex couples until the province's laws were updated. This was different from how the process had worked in other provinces; in those where courts called for same-sex marriage, and in Alberta after the Civil Marriage Act was passed. On July 22, Prince Edward Island was the only remaining province in the country where same-sex couples could not marry in practice. Dover said, "We'll do it as quickly as we can. We didn't prepare beforehand because, if we had prepared and changed all the wording, then people would say 'Why did you do that when it hadn't passed?'" Complaints immediately arose charging that the delay imposed by the province was illegal and violated the legal rights of same-sex couples. In response to these complaints, the province reversed its position. The first same-sex couple to wed on Prince Edward Island were Dr. Chris Zarow and Constance Majeau on August 20, 2005 in Vernon Bridge, as reported by the Charlottetown Guardian. Reverend Barry King officiated at the ceremony. He said: "Today we celebrate the beginning of a journey for Connie and Chris. This journey is filled with joy because it's filled with love. Connie and Chris chose this path because they love each other."

== Provincial legislation ==
In May 2008, provincial law was finally brought in line with the federal legislation. A bill amending the Marriage Act (French: Loi sur le mariage; Mi'kmaq: Malie'wuti Tplutaqan) and other acts regarding family law was passed by the Legislative Assembly of Prince Edward Island. It replaced references to "husband and wife" with the gender-neutral term "spouses", and received royal assent from Lieutenant Governor Barbara Oliver Hagerman. Provincial law was also amended to allow married same-sex couples to adopt children jointly. It took effect on 19 December 2009.

Prince Edward Island legislation also recognises cohabitation agreements which can be entered into by unmarried couples living together. These written agreements, recognized by the provincial Family Law Act, outline the rights and responsibilities of common-law partners. The agreement provides partners with some, but not all, of the rights and benefits of marriage. Common-law partners have the same rights to spousal support, child support and child custody as married couples. However, common-law couples are treated differently to married spouses with regard to inheritance and property rights. They have no right to inheritance if the partner were to die, and do not have a right to division of property or to stay in the common home upon separation or the death of the partner.

== Marriage statistics ==
The 2016 Canadian census showed that there were 230 same-sex couples living in Prince Edward Island.

== Religious performance ==
In July 2019, the synod of the Anglican Church of Canada passed a resolution known as "A Word to the Church", allowing its dioceses to choose whether to bless and perform same-sex marriages. In September of the same year, Bishop Ron Cutler of the Diocese of Nova Scotia and Prince Edward Island issued a pastoral letter allowing local parishes to perform same-sex marriages. Reverend John Clarke at St. Paul's Anglican Church in Charlottetown had expressed support for same-sex marriage in 2016 while discussions on allowing same-sex weddings in the Church were ongoing; "We certainly want to be welcoming of the gay, lesbian, transgender community for sure. And people who disagree with the stance that the church is in the process of taking should feel welcome here as well."

Some other religious organisations also perform same-sex marriages in their places of worship, including the United Church of Canada, Quakers, the Evangelical Lutheran Church in Canada, and the Canadian Unitarian Council.

== Public opinion ==
A 2017 CROP poll showed that 78% of respondents in Atlantic Canada supported same-sex marriage, but did not give a figure for each Atlantic province individually. Nationwide, 74% of Canadians found it "great that in Canada, two people of the same sex can get married", while 26% disagreed.

== See also ==
- Same-sex marriage in Canada
- LGBT rights in Canada
