= Common-law relationship =

Common-law relationship may refer to:

- Common-law marriage
- Common-law relationships in Canada
- De facto relationship
