= Same-sex marriage in Canada =

Same-sex marriage was progressively introduced in several provinces and territories of Canada by court decisions beginning in 2003 before being legally recognized nationwide with the enactment of the Civil Marriage Act on July 20, 2005. On June 10, 2003, the Court of Appeal for Ontario issued a decision immediately legalizing same-sex marriage in Ontario, thereby becoming the first province where it was legal. The introduction of a federal gender-neutral marriage definition made Canada the fourth country in the world, and the first country outside Europe, to legally recognize same-sex marriage throughout its borders. Before the federal recognition of same-sex marriage, court decisions had already introduced it in eight out of ten provinces and one of three territories, whose residents collectively made up about 90 percent of Canada's population. More than 3,000 same-sex couples had already married in those areas before the Civil Marriage Act was passed. In 2023, polling by Pew Research suggested that more than three-quarters of Canadian residents supported the legal recognition of same-sex marriage. Most legal benefits commonly associated with marriage had been extended to cohabiting same-sex couples since 1999.

The Civil Marriage Act was introduced by Prime Minister Paul Martin's Liberal minority government to the House of Commons of Canada on February 1, 2005, as Bill C-38. It was passed by the House of Commons on June 28, 2005, and by the Senate on July 19, 2005, it received royal assent the following day. Following the 2006 election, which was won by a Conservative minority government under Prime Minister Stephen Harper, the House of Commons defeated a motion to reopen the matter by a vote of 175 to 123 on December 7, 2006, effectively reaffirming the legislation. This was the third vote supporting same-sex marriage taken by three parliaments under three prime ministers.

== Same-sex marriage by province/territory ==
Same-sex marriage was legally recognized in the provinces and territories as of the following dates:

- June 10, 2003: Ontario
- July 8, 2003: British Columbia
- March 19, 2004: Quebec
- July 14, 2004: Yukon
- September 16, 2004: Manitoba
- September 24, 2004: Nova Scotia
- November 5, 2004: Saskatchewan
- December 21, 2004: Newfoundland and Labrador
- June 23, 2005: New Brunswick
- July 20, 2005 (Civil Marriage Act): Alberta, Prince Edward Island, Nunavut and the Northwest Territories

In some of these cases, some marriages were in fact legal at an earlier date (for example, an Ontario ruling held that marriages performed in January 2001 were legal when performed), but the legality was questioned. As of the given dates, the legality was authoritatively established. The decision of the Government of Ontario to recognize two marriages that took place in Toronto on January 14, 2001, retroactively made Canada the first country in the world to have a government-legitimized same-sex marriage (the Netherlands and Belgium, which legalized same-sex marriage before Canada, had their first in April 2001 and June 2003, respectively).

== Overview ==
Provinces and territories with same-sex marriage before its nationwide legalization on July 20, 2005. Permitted Did not permit

Same-sex marriage was originally recognized by law as a result of cases in which courts in eight out of the ten Canadian provinces, and in one of its three territories, ruled existing bans on same-sex marriage unconstitutional. Thereafter, many same-sex couples obtained marriage licences in those provinces; like opposite-sex couples, they did not need to be residents of any of those provinces to marry there.

The legal status of same-sex marriages in these jurisdictions created an unusual jurisdictional issue. According to the Constitution of Canada, the definition of marriage is the exclusive responsibility of the federal government; this interpretation was upheld by a December 9, 2004, opinion of the Supreme Court of Canada (Reference Re Same-Sex Marriage). Until July 20, 2005, the federal government had not yet passed a law redefining marriage to conform to recent court decisions. Until the passage of the Civil Marriage Act, the previous definition of marriage remained binding in the four jurisdictions (two provinces and two territories) where courts had not yet ruled it unconstitutional, but void in the nine jurisdictions (eight provinces and one territory) where it had been successfully challenged before the courts. Before the enactment of federal legislation recognizing same-sex marriage, therefore, the application of federal marriage law differed depending on the province or territory.

Given the Supreme Court ruling, the role of precedent in Canadian law, and the overall legal climate, it was very likely that any challenges to legalize same-sex marriage in the remaining four jurisdictions would be successful as well. Federal lawyers had ceased to contest such cases, and only Alberta's Conservative provincial government remained officially opposed. Premier Ralph Klein threatened to invoke the notwithstanding clause of the Canadian Charter of Rights and Freedoms to avoid having to comply with the ruling. Many commentators opined that a province likely could not use the notwithstanding clause to avoid recognizing same-sex marriage because the federal government had jurisdiction over marriage. Alberta Attorney General Ron Stevens agreed with that conclusion, stating: "Since the court ruled the authority over same-sex marriage falls to the federal government, it is only the federal government who can invoke the notwithstanding clause to maintain the traditional definition of marriage."

On June 17, 2003, Prime Minister Jean Chrétien announced that the government would present a bill to grant same-sex couples equal rights to marry. A draft of what would become Bill C-38 was released on July 17, 2003, by Justice Minister Martin Cauchon. Before introducing it to Parliament, the Cabinet submitted the bill as a reference to the Supreme Court (Reference Re Same-Sex Marriage), asking the court to rule on whether limiting marriage to heterosexual couples was consistent with the Canadian Charter of Rights and Freedoms and if same-sex civil unions were an acceptable alternative. On December 9, 2004, the Supreme Court of Canada ruled that the marriage of same-sex couples is constitutional, that the federal government has the sole authority to amend the definition of marriage, and the Charter's protection of freedom of religion grants religious institutions the right to refuse to perform marriage ceremonies for same-sex couples.

Following the Supreme Court's decision, Justice Minister Irwin Cotler introduced Bill C-38 on February 1, 2005, to legalize marriage between persons of the same sex across Canada. The government of Prime Minister Paul Martin supported the bill but allowed a free vote by its backbench MPs in the House of Commons. Defeat of the bill in Parliament would have continued the status quo and probably incremental legalization, jurisdiction by jurisdiction, via court challenges. This trend could have been reversed only through Parliament passing a new law that explicitly restricted marriage to opposite-sex couples notwithstanding the protection of equality rights afforded by the Canadian Charter of Rights and Freedoms or by amending the Canadian Constitution by inserting the clause "marriage is defined as being between a man and a woman", as was recommended by several conservative religious groups and politicians. Given the composition of the House of Commons at the time, such a measure would have been very unlikely to pass. Premier Klein proposed putting the question to the public at large via a national referendum, but his suggestion was rejected by all four party leaders.

== History ==
=== Court rulings ===
==== Background ====
In 1999, the Supreme Court of Canada ruled in M v H that same-sex couples in Canada were entitled to receive many of the financial and legal benefits commonly associated with marriage. However, this decision stopped short of giving them the right to full legal marriage. Most laws which affect couples are within provincial rather than federal jurisdiction. As a result, rights varied somewhat from province to province.

On January 14, 2001, Reverend Brent Hawkes forced the issue by performing two same-sex marriages, taking advantage of the fact that Ontario law authorizes him to perform marriages without a previous license, via the issuance of banns of marriage. The registrar refused to accept the records of marriage, and a lawsuit was commenced over whether the marriages were legally performed. In other provinces, lawsuits were launched seeking permission to marry.

In 2002 and 2003, decisions in the superior trial courts of Ontario and Quebec, Halpern v Canada (AG) and Hendricks and Leboeuf v. Quebec, held that the restriction of marriage to opposite-sex couples was discriminatory and contrary to the equality clause of the Canadian Charter of Rights of Freedoms, while the Supreme Court of British Columbia ruled oppositely. On May 1, 2003, the British Columbia Court of Appeal reversed the superior court decision. The courts in each case suspended the effect of the declarations of invalidity for two years, to allow the federal government to consider legislative responses to the rulings. However, on June 10, 2003, the Court of Appeal for Ontario ruled on an appeal in the Halpern case. The court agreed with the lower court that the heterosexual definition of marriage was discriminatory and that same-sex marriage was legally permitted. However, unlike the previous three court decisions, the Court of Appeal did not suspend its decision to allow Parliament to consider the issue. Instead, it ruled that the 2001 marriages were legal and same-sex marriage was available throughout Ontario immediately. The federal government had appealed the trial decisions to the provincial courts of appeal, but following the decision on the Ontario Court of Appeal, Prime Minister Chrétien announced on June 17, 2003, that the federal government would not seek to appeal the decisions to the Supreme Court. Instead, it would propose a draft Civil Marriage Act and refer it to the Supreme Court for an advisory opinion.

==== Ontario decision ====
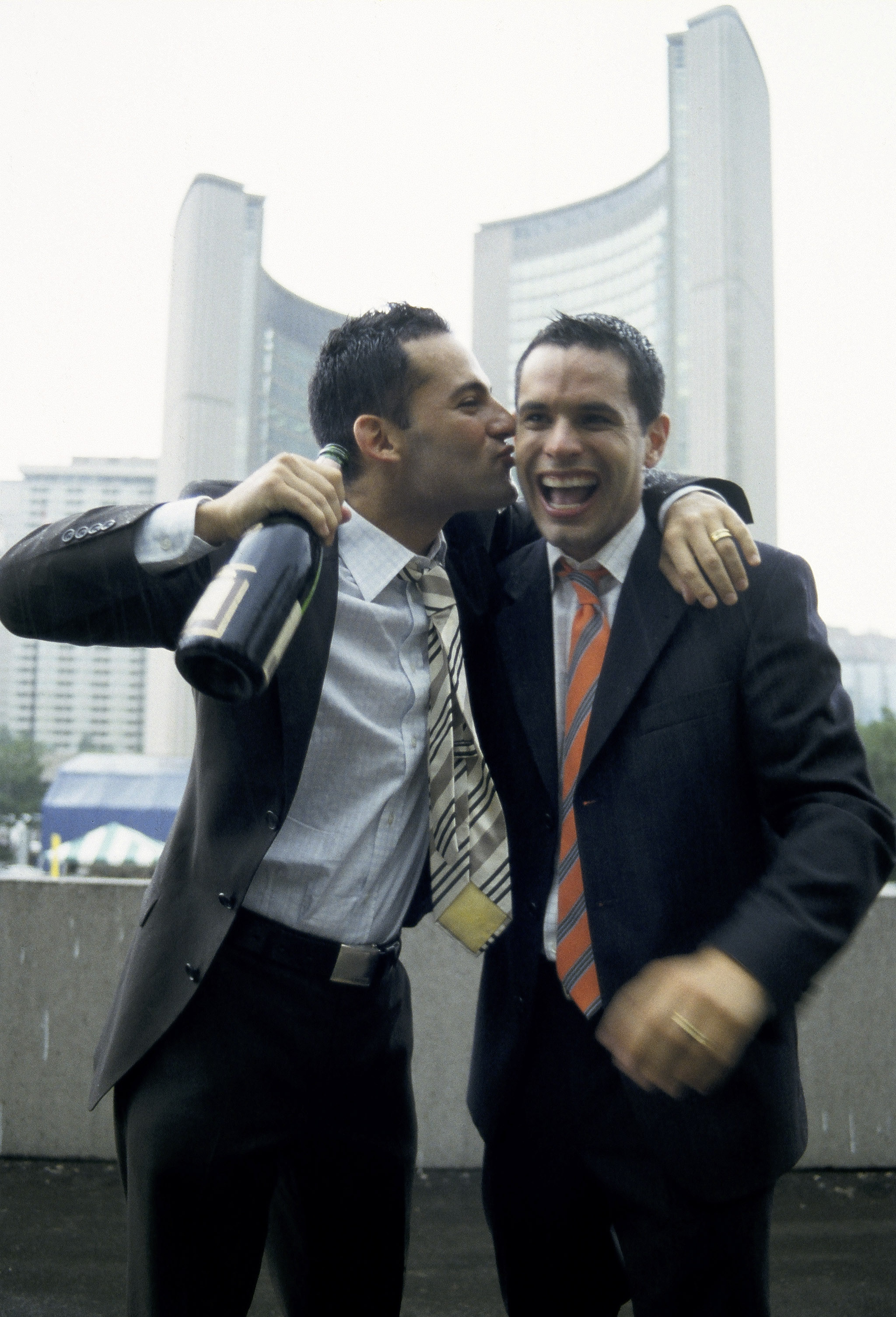
2003 wedding of Mathieu Chantelois and Marcelo Gomez in Toronto

In 2003, the couples in Halpern v. Canada appealed the decision, requesting that the decision take effect immediately instead of after a delay. On June 10, 2003, the Court of Appeal for Ontario confirmed that current Canadian law on marriage violated the equality provisions in the Canadian Charter of Rights and Freedoms in being restricted to heterosexual couples. The court did not allow the province any grace time to bring its laws in line with the ruling, making Ontario the first jurisdiction in North America to recognize same-sex marriage. The city of Toronto announced that the city clerk would begin issuing marriage licences to same-sex couples. The first same-sex couple to marry, just hours after the Court of Appeal decision, were Michael Leshner and Michael Stark, long-time advocates for marriage equality for same-sex couples who had been litigants and intervenors in various court cases addressing the issue, including the Court of Appeal decision. The next day, Attorney General Norm Sterling announced that his government would comply with the ruling. The court also ruled that Kevin Bourassa and Joe Varnell, and Elaine and Anne Vautour, two same-sex couples who were married on January 14, 2001, at a wedding ceremony in the Metropolitan Community Church of Toronto following an ancient common-law procedure called the reading of the banns, would be considered legally married.

On September 13, 2004, the Ontario Court of Appeal declared the Divorce Act also unconstitutional for excluding same-sex marriages. It ordered same-sex marriages read into that act, permitting the plaintiffs, a lesbian couple, to divorce.

==== British Columbia decision ====
A ruling, quite similar to the Ontario ruling, was issued by the British Columbia Court of Appeal on July 8, 2003. Another decision in British Columbia in May of that year had required the federal government to change the law to permit same-sex marriages, Barbeau v. British Columbia. The July ruling stated that "any further delay... will result in an unequal application of the law between Ontario and British Columbia". A few hours after the announcement, Antony Porcino and Tom Graff became the first two men to be legally wed in British Columbia.

==== Quebec decision ====
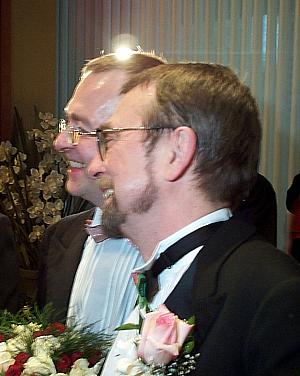
Michael Hendricks and René Leboeuf, the first same-sex couple to legally marry in Quebec

On March 19, 2004, the Quebec Court of Appeal ruled similarly to the Ontario and British Columbia courts, upholding Hendricks and Leboeuf v. Quebec and ordering that it take effect immediately. The couple who brought the suit, Michael Hendricks and René Leboeuf, immediately sought a marriage licence; the usual 20-day waiting period was waived, and they were wed on April 1 at the Palais de justice in Montreal.

Given the populations of Ontario, British Columbia and Quebec, more than two-thirds of Canada's population lived in provinces where same-sex marriage had been legalized after the Quebec decision.

==== Yukon decision ====
On July 14, 2004, in Dunbar & Edge v. Yukon (Government of) & Canada (A.G.), the Supreme Court of Yukon issued another similar ruling with immediate effect. Rather than reproducing the Charter equality arguments used by the other courts, the court ruled that since the provincial courts of appeal had ruled that the heterosexual definition of marriage was unconstitutional, it was unconstitutional across Canada. The position was strengthened by the Attorney General's refusal to appeal those rulings. It further ruled that to continue to restrict marriages in Yukon to opposite-sex couples would result in an unacceptable state of a provision's being in force in one jurisdiction and not another.

On August 16, 2004, Justice Minister Irwin Cotler indicated that the federal government would no longer oppose court cases to implement same-sex marriage in the provinces and territories.

==== Manitoba decision ====
On September 16, 2004, Justice Douglas Yard of the Manitoba Court of Queen's Bench declared the then-current definition of marriage unconstitutional. The judge said that his decision had been influenced by the previous decisions in British Columbia, Ontario and Quebec. This decision followed suits brought by three couples in Manitoba requesting that they be issued marriage licences. Both the provincial and federal governments had made it known that they would not oppose the court bid. One of the couples, Chris Vogel and Richard North, had legally sought the right to marry in a high-profile case in 1974, but had been denied.

==== Nova Scotia decision ====
In August 2004, three couples in Nova Scotia brought suit in Boutilier et al. v. Canada (A.G) and Nova Scotia (A.G) against the provincial government requesting that it issue marriage licences to same-sex couples. On September 24, 2004, Justice Heather Robertson of the Nova Scotia Supreme Court ruled the then-current law unconstitutional. Neither the federal nor the provincial governments opposed the ruling.

==== Saskatchewan decision ====
Five couples brought suit in Saskatchewan for the recognition of their marriage in a case that was heard by the Saskatchewan Court of Queen's Bench in chambers on November 3, 2004. On November 5, 2004, the judge ruled that excluding same-sex couples from marriage violated the Charter's right to equality and that the common-law definition was discriminatory, thereby bringing same-sex marriage to Saskatchewan.

==== Newfoundland and Labrador decision ====
Two lesbian couples brought suit on November 4, 2004, to have Newfoundland and Labrador recognize same-sex marriage. As with the previous decisions, the provincial government did not oppose the suit; moreover, the federal government actually supported it. The case went to trial on December 20 and the next day, Justice Derek Green ordered the provincial government to begin issuing marriage licences to same-sex couples, an order with which the provincial government announced it would comply.

==== New Brunswick decision ====
Two same-sex couples in New Brunswick brought suit in April 2005 to request an order requiring the provincial government to issue them marriage licences. This was granted in June 2005. Premier Bernard Lord, who personally opposed same-sex marriage, pledged to follow a directive to provide for same-sex marriages from the courts or from Parliament.

==== Proceedings in the Northwest Territories ====
On May 20, 2005, a gay male couple with a daughter brought suit in the Northwest Territories for the right to marry. Territorial Justice Minister Charles Dent had previously said that the government would not contest such a lawsuit. The case was to be heard on May 27 but ended when the federal government legalized same-sex marriage.

=== Discussion in Parliament, 1995–2003 ===
The shift in Canadian attitudes towards acceptance of same-sex marriage and recent court rulings caused the Parliament of Canada to reverse its position on the issue. On September 18, 1995, the House of Commons voted 124 to 52 to reject a motion introduced by openly gay member of Parliament Réal Ménard calling for the legal recognition of same-sex relationships. A 2006 study by Mark W. Lehman suggested that between 1997 and 2004, Canadian public opinion on legalizing same-sex marriage underwent a dramatic shift, moving from minority support to majority support and that this support was the result of a significant shift in positive feelings towards gays and lesbians.

The first bill to legalize same-sex marriage was a private member's bill tabled in the House of Commons by New Democratic MP Svend Robinson on March 25, 1998. Like most private members' bills, it did not progress past first reading, and was reintroduced in several subsequent parliaments. In 1999, the House of Commons overwhelmingly passed a resolution to re-affirm the definition of marriage as "the union of one man and one woman to the exclusion of all others". The following year, this definition of marriage was included in the revised Bill C-23, the Modernization of Benefits and Obligations Act 2000 (French: Loi sur la modernisation de certains régimes d'avantages et d'obligations), which continued to bar same-sex couples from full marriage rights. In early 2003, the issue once again resurfaced, and the House of Commons Standing Committee on Justice and Human Rights proceeded to undertake a formal study of same-sex marriage, including a cross-country series of public hearings. Just after the Ontario court decision, it voted to recommend that the federal government not appeal the ruling.

Civil status is of provincial jurisdiction in Canada. However, the definition of marriage is a matter of federal jurisdiction. On June 17, 2003, Prime Minister Chrétien announced that the government would not appeal the Ontario ruling, and that his government would introduce legislation to recognize same-sex marriage but protect the rights of religious groups to decide which marriages they would solemnize.

A draft of the bill was issued on July 17. It read:

1. Marriage, for civil purposes, is the lawful union of two persons to the exclusion of all others.
2. Nothing in this Act affects the freedom of officials of religious groups to refuse to perform marriages that are not in accordance with their religious beliefs.

The draft bill was subsequently referred to the Supreme Court of Canada.

On September 16, 2003, a motion was brought to Parliament by the Canadian Alliance (now the Conservative Party) to once again reaffirm the heterosexual definition of marriage. The same language that had been passed in 1999 was brought to a conscience vote, with members asked to vote for or against the 1999 definition of marriage as "the union of one man and one woman to the exclusion of all others". Motions are not legislatively binding in Canada, and are mostly done for symbolic purposes. The September vote was extremely divisive, however. Prime Minister Chrétien reversed his previous stance and voted against the motion, as did Paul Martin (who later became prime minister) and many other prominent Liberals. Several Liberals retained their original stance, however, and thus the vote was not defined purely along party lines. Controversially, over 30 members of the House did not attend the vote, the majority of whom were Liberals who had voted against legalizing same-sex marriage in 1999. In the end, the motion was narrowly rejected by a vote of 137–132.

=== Supreme Court Reference Re Same-Sex Marriage ===
In 2003, the Liberal government referred a draft bill on same-sex marriage to the Supreme Court of Canada, essentially asking it to review the bill's constitutionality before it was introduced. The reference, as originally posed by the Chrétien government, asked three questions:

1. Is the annexed Proposal for an Act respecting certain aspects of legal capacity for marriage for civil purposes within the exclusive legislative authority of the Parliament of Canada? If not, in what particular or particulars, and to what extent?
2. If the answer to question 1 is yes, is section 1 of the proposal, which extends capacity to marry to persons of the same sex, consistent with the Canadian Charter of Rights and Freedoms? If not, in what particular or particulars, and to what extent?
3. Does the freedom of religion guaranteed by paragraph 2(a) of the Canadian Charter of Rights and Freedoms protect religious officials from being compelled to perform a marriage between two persons of the same sex that is contrary to their religious beliefs?

The government of Prime Minister Martin later added a fourth question in January 2004:

4. Is the opposite-sex requirement for marriage for civil purposes, as established by the common law and set out for Quebec in s. 5 of the Federal Law-Civil Law Harmonization Act, No. 1, consistent with the Canadian Charter of Rights and Freedoms? If not, in what particular or particulars and to what extent?

The addition of a fourth question considerably delayed the opening of the court reference until well after the June 2004 general election, raising accusations of stalling. In its hearings that began in October 2004, the Supreme Court of Canada accused the government of using the court for other goals when it declined to appeal rulings that altered the definition of marriage in several provinces; " Justice Ian Binnie said it 'may not fulfill any useful purpose' to examine traditional marriage all over again, 'given the policy decision of the government'". The Supreme Court of Canada ruled that the government has the authority to amend the definition of marriage but did not rule on whether or not such a change is required by the equality provisions of the Canadian Charter of Rights and Freedoms. The court stated that such a ruling is not necessary because the federal government had accepted the rulings of provincial courts to the effect that the change was required. The court also ruled that given the freedom of religion provisions in the Charter, and the wording of provincial human rights codes, it was highly unlikely that religious institutions could be compelled to perform same-sex marriages, though because solemnization of marriage is a matter for provincial governments, the proposed bill could not actually guarantee such protections.

=== Debate prior to C-38's introduction ===
On December 9, 2004, Prime Minister Martin indicated that the federal government would introduce legislation expanding marriage to same-sex couples. The government's decision was announced immediately following the court's answer in the Reference Re Same-Sex Marriage reference question. The parliamentary bill caused rifts in the House of Commons, especially among the governing Liberals. Many Liberal MPs indicated that they would oppose the government's position in favour of same-sex marriage at a free vote. The majority of each of the Liberal Party, the New Democratic Party and the Bloc Québécois voted in favour of the bill; the majority of the Conservative Party voted against the bill.

In 2000, Alberta had amended its Marriage Act to define marriage as being between "a man and a woman". The law included a notwithstanding clause in an attempt to protect the amendment from being invalidated under the Charter. However, the amendment was invalid since, under the Canadian Constitution, the definition of marriage is a federal right.

Complicating matters, Conservative Party leader Stephen Harper indicated that a Conservative government would work to restore the prohibition on same-sex marriage if Parliament voted to do so in a free vote. Following the court decision on December 9, Premier Ralph Klein of Alberta suggested that a national referendum be held on same-sex marriage, a measure Prime Minister Martin rejected.

=== Legislative progress of the Civil Marriage Act ===
Bill C-38, the Civil Marriage Act (French: Loi sur le mariage civil), was introduced to Parliament for its first reading in the House of Commons on February 1, 2005. Prime Minister Martin launched the debate on February 16. The bill passed second reading on May 4 and third reading on June 28, with votes of 164–137 and 158–133, respectively. It then moved to the Senate, and received its first reading on June 29. Debate was launched on July 4, and a Liberal closure motion limited debate on the bill to only four hours. Second reading and committing the bill occurred on July 6, with a vote of 43–12. The Senate passed the legislation on third reading by a margin of 47 to 21 on July 19, 2005. It received royal assent at the hand of Beverley McLachlin (in her capacity as the Deputy of the Governor General of Canada) on July 20, 2005.

June 28, 2005 (third reading) vote in the House of Commons of Canada
Party	Voted for	Voted against	Abstained
Liberal Party (LPC/PLC)	95: Peter Adams; Reg Alcock; David Anderson; Jean Augustine; Larry Bagnell; Navdeep Bains; Sue Barnes; Colleen Beaumier; Mauril Bélanger; Don Bell; Carolyn Bennett; Maurizio Bevilacqua; Ethel Blondin-Andrew; Françoise Boivin; Don Boudria; Claudette Bradshaw; Scott Brison; Bonnie Brown; Sarmite Bulte; Aileen Carroll; Marlene Catterall; Raymond Chan; Denis Coderre; Irwin Cotler; Jean-Claude D'Amours; Paul DeVillers; Ruby Dhalla; Stéphane Dion; Ujjal Dosanjh; Claude Drouin; Ken Dryden; Wayne Easter; David Emerson; Mark Eyking; Raymonde Folco; Joe Fontana; Liza Frulla; Hedy Fry; Marc Godbout; John Godfrey; Ralph Goodale; Bill Graham; Albina Guarnieri; Mark Holland; Tony Ianno; Marlene Jennings; Susan Kadis; Nancy Karetak-Lindell; Jean Lapierre; Dominic LeBlanc; Paul Harold Macklin; Diane Marleau; Keith Martin; Paul Martin; John McCallum; David McGuinty; Joe McGuire; Anne McLellan; Maria Minna; Andy Mitchell; Shawn Murphy; Lynn Myers; Anita Neville; Stephen Owen; Denis Paradis; Jim Peterson; Pierre Pettigrew; Beth Phinney; Jerry Pickard; Russ Powers; Marcel Proulx; Yasmin Ratansi; Karen Redman; Geoff Regan; Lucienne Robillard; Pablo Rodriguez; Anthony Rota; Todd Russell; Jacques Saada; Michael Savage; Andy Scott; Judy Sgro; Mario Silva; David Smith; Lloyd St. Amand; Brent St. Denis; Belinda Stronach; Andrew Telegdi; Lui Temelkovski; Robert Thibault; Paddy Torsney; Tony Valeri; Roger Valley; Joe Volpe; Borys Wrzesnewskyj	32: Raymond Bonin; Ken Boshcoff; John Cannis; Gary Carr; Brenda Chamberlain; Joe Comuzzi; Rodger Cuzner; Roger Gallaway; Charles Hubbard; Jim Karygiannis; Wajid Khan; Walt Lastewka; Derek Lee; Judi Longfield; Lawrence MacAulay; Gurbax Singh Malhi; John David Maloney; Bill Matthews; John McKay; Dan McTeague; Massimo Pacetti; Andy Savoy; Francis Scarpaleggia; Raymond Simard; Scott Simms; Paul Steckle; Paul Szabo; Alan Tonks; Rose-Marie Ur; Tom Wappel; Bryon Wilfert; Paul Zed	2: Roy Cullen; Bernard Patry
Conservative Party (CPC/PCC)	3: Gerald Keddy; James Moore; Jim Prentice	93: Jim Abbott; Diane Ablonczy; Dean Allison; Rona Ambrose; Rob Anders; David Anderson; Dave Batters; Leon Benoit; James Bezan; Garry Breitkreuz; Gord Brown; Colin Carrie; Bill Casey; Rick Casson; David Chatters; Michael Chong; John Cummins; Stockwell Day; Barry Devolin; Norman Doyle; John Duncan; Ken Epp; Diane Finley; Brian Fitzpatrick; Steven Fletcher; Paul Forseth; Cheryl Gallant; Peter Goldring; Gary Goodyear; Nina Grewal; Gurmant Grewal; Helena Guergis; Art Hanger; Stephen Harper; Dick Harris; Jeremy Harrison; Loyola Hearn; Russ Hiebert; Jay Hill; Betty Hinton; Rahim Jaffer; Brian Jean; Dale Johnston; Randy Kamp; Jason Kenney; Ed Komarnicki; Daryl Kramp; Guy Lauzon; Tom Lukiwski; Gary Lunn; James Lunney; Peter MacKay; Dave MacKenzie; Inky Mark; Ted Menzies; Rob Merrifield; Larry Miller; Bob Mills; Rob Moore; Rob Nicholson; Deepak Obhrai; Gordon O'Connor; Bev Oda; Brian Pallister; Pierre Poilievre; Joe Preston; James Rajotte; Scott Reid; John Reynolds; Lee Richardson; Gerry Ritz; Andrew Scheer; Gary Schellenberger; Werner Schmidt; Carol Skelton; Joy Smith; Monte Solberg; Kevin Sorenson; Darrel Stinson; Chuck Strahl; Myron Thompson; Greg Thompson; David Tilson; Vic Toews; Brad Trost; Merv Tweed; Peter Van Loan; Maurice Vellacott; Mark Warawa; Jeff Watson; Randy White; John Williams; Lynne Yelich	-
Bloc Québécois (BQ)	43: Guy André; Claude Bachand; André Bellavance; Bernard Bigras; Raynald Blais; Alain Boire; France Bonsant; Marc Boulianne; Diane Bourgeois; Paule Brunelle; Robert Carrier; Roger Clavet; Bernard Cleary; Guy Côté; Paul Crête; Nicole Demers; Johanne Deschamps; Gilles Duceppe; Meili Faille; Christiane Gagnon; Marcel Gagnon; Sébastien Gagnon; Michel Gauthier; Monique Guay; Michel Guimond; Mario Laframboise; Francine Lalonde; Réal Lapierre; Carole Lavallée; Marc Lemay; Yves Lessard; Yvon Lévesque; Yvan Loubier; Richard Marceau; Réal Ménard; Serge Ménard; Pauline Picard; Louis Plamondon; Denise Poirier-Rivard; Jean-Yves Roy; Benoît Sauvageau; Christian Simard; Robert Vincent	5: Robert Bouchard; Serge Cardin; Roger Gaudet; Gilles Perron; Louise Thibault	2: Stéphane Bergeron; Pierre Paquette
New Democratic Party (NDP/NPD)	17: Charlie Angus; Bill Blaikie; Ed Broadbent; David Christopherson; Joe Comartin; Jean Crowder; Nathan Cullen; Libby Davies; Yvon Godin; Peter Julian; Jack Layton; Tony Martin; Pat Martin; Brian Masse; Alexa McDonough; Bill Siksay; Peter Stoffer	1: Bev Desjarlais	-
Independent	-	2: David Kilgour; Pat O'Brien	-
Total	158	133	4

July 19, 2005 (third reading) vote in the Senate of Canada
Party	Voted for	Voted against	Abstained
Liberal Party (LPC/PLC)	41: Jack Austin; Lise Bacon; George Baker; Michel Biron; John G. Bryden; Catherine Callbeck; Maria Chaput; Marie Charette-Poulin; Ione Christensen; Joan Cook; Jane Cordy; Roméo Dallaire; Percy Downe; Art Eggleton; Joyce Fairbairn; Ross Fitzpatrick; George Furey; Jerry Grafstein; Mac Harb; Libbe Hubley; Mobina Jaffer; Serge Joyal; Colin Kenny; Rose-Marie Losier-Cool; Shirley Maheu; Frank Mahovlich; Paul Massicotte; Terry Mercer; Lorna Milne; Grant Mitchell; Jim Munson; Landon Pearson; Lucie Pépin; Robert Peterson; Vivienne Poy; Pierrette Ringuette; Fernand Robichaud; Bill Rompkey; David Smith; Claudette Tardif; Marilyn Trenholme Counsell	5: Tommy Banks; Céline Hervieux-Payette; Pana Merchant; Gerard Phalen; Nick Sibbeston	2: Eymard Corbin; Wilfred Moore
Conservative Party (CPC/PCC)	1: Michael Meighen	15: W. David Angus; John Buchanan; Ethel Cochrane; Gerald Comeau; Anne Cools; Consiglio Di Nino; Trevor Eyton; Michael Forrestall; Lenard Gustafson; James Kelleher; Wilbert Keon; Noël Kinsella; Gerry St. Germain; Terry Stratton; David Tkachuk	1: Marjory LeBreton
Progressive Conservative Party (PC)	2: Norman Atkins; Nancy Ruth	-	-
Independent New Democratic Party (NDP/NPD)	1: Lillian Dyck	-	-
Independent	2: Marcel Prud'homme; Mira Spivak	1: Madeleine Plamondon	-
Total	47	21	3

=== Same-sex marriage in the 39th Parliament ===
The Conservative Party, led by Harper, won a minority government in the federal election on January 23, 2006. Harper had campaigned on the promise of holding a conscience vote on a motion to re-open the debate on same-sex marriage. The motion would re-open the same-sex marriage debate, but did not prescribe restoring the opposite-sex definition of marriage. A news report from CTV News on May 31, 2006, showed that a growing number of Conservatives were wary about re-opening the debate on same-sex marriage. One cabinet minister stated he just wanted the issue "to go away", while others including Chuck Strahl and Bill Casey were undecided, instead of directly opposed. Foreign Affairs Minister Peter MacKay noted that not a single constituent had approached him on the issue, and Minister for Fisheries and Oceans Loyola Hearn was against re-opening the debate.

By November 2006, the debate had shifted and it was the supporters of same-sex marriage that were arguing for a fall vote on the issue and the opponents who were lobbying for a delay. On December 6, 2006, the government brought in a motion asking if the issue of same-sex marriage debate should be re-opened. This motion was defeated the next day in a vote of 175 (nays) to 123 (yeas). Prime Minister Harper afterwards told reporters, "I don't see reopening this question in the future."

=== Post-2006 ===
In 2016, the Conservatives amended their party's constitution to recognize and support same-sex marriage.

=== Recognition of foreign legal unions ===
In Hincks v. Gallardo, the Ontario Superior Court of Justice decided on January 7, 2013, that same-sex partners who entered into civil partnerships in the United Kingdom are to be treated as married for the purposes of Canadian law.

=== Marriage statistics ===
From June 2003 (date of the first same-sex marriages in Ontario) to October 2006, 12,438 same-sex marriages were contracted in Canada.

Province	Date of legalization	Number of same-sex marriages
Ontario	June 10, 2003	6,524
British Columbia	July 8, 2003	3,927
Quebec	March 19, 2004	947
Alberta	July 20, 2005	409
Nova Scotia	September 24, 2004	273
Manitoba	September 16, 2004	193
Saskatchewan	November 5, 2004	83
New Brunswick	June 23, 2005	44
Newfoundland and Labrador	December 21, 2004	14
Yukon	July 14, 2004	13
Prince Edward Island	July 20, 2005	8
Northwest Territories	July 20, 2005	2
Nunavut	July 20, 2005	1

By 2011, 21,015 same-sex marriages had been performed in Canada, with an additional 43,560 cohabiting same-sex couples. According to the 2016 census, there were 72,880 same-sex couples residing in Canada, of which 24,370 (33.4 per cent) were married. In British Columbia, 38.5 per cent of all same-sex couples were married, compared to 38.2 per cent in Ontario and 22.5 per cent in Quebec. 10,020 children were living in same-sex families.

== Other same-sex partner benefits in Canada ==
=== Other kinds of partnership ===
Canadian cohabiting same-sex couples are entitled to many of the same legal and financial benefits as married opposite-sex couples. In 1999, after the court case of M v H, the Supreme Court of Canada declared that same-sex partners must also be extended the rights and benefits of common-law relationships.

The province of Quebec also offers civil unions to same-sex couples. Nova Scotia's domestic partnerships offer similar benefits. Legislative changes between 2001 and 2004 extended the benefits of common-law relationships in Manitoba to same-sex couples as well as those of different sex. In 2003, Alberta passed a law recognizing adult interdependent relationships. These relationships provide specific financial benefits to interdependent adults, including blood relations.

=== Recognition in other provinces and territories ===
The legal status of same-sex marriages in provinces and territories that did not perform them was uncertain prior to the passage of the Civil Marriage Act. One of the couples that brought suit in Nova Scotia acted so that their Ontario marriage would be recognized.

Premier Ralph Klein wanted to prevent same-sex marriages from being performed or recognized in Alberta, but eventually admitted that the province's chances of doing so were slim to none, and said Alberta would obey the legislation. By contrast, the other remaining province without same-sex marriage, Prince Edward Island, announced that it would voluntarily bring its laws into compliance with the federal legislation.

In October 2003, Premier Paul Okalik announced that Nunavut would recognize same-sex marriages performed in other provinces and territories.

=== Immigration ===
Immigration, Refugees and Citizenship Canada (IRCC) acknowledges same-sex marriages contracted in Canada between immigration applicants and Canadian citizens or permanent residents. Canadians may also sponsor their same-sex common-law or civil union partners for family-class immigration, provided they meet various requirements, including proof of legitimacy and cohabitation for at least one year.

After the enactment of the Civil Marriage Act, IRCC adopted an interim immigration policy which did not recognize same-sex marriages conducted outside of Canada. For example, a Canadian citizen, legally married in the Netherlands to his or her same-sex Dutch partner, could not sponsor his or her Dutch partner for immigration as a spouse, despite the fact that both Dutch law and Canadian law made no distinction between opposite-sex and same-sex civil marriages, and despite the fact that IRCC did recognize a Dutch opposite-sex marriage.

On December 12, 2006, New Democratic Party MP Bill Siksay introduced a motion in the House of Commons of Canada Standing Committee on Citizenship and Immigration calling on the IRCC to immediately rescind the interim policy and "recognize legal marriages of gay and lesbian couples performed in jurisdictions outside Canada for purposes of immigration in exactly the same way as the legal marriages of heterosexual couples are recognized"; the committee voted to recommend that the government do this. In late January 2007, Citizenship and Immigration Minister Diane Finley informed the committee that this would be done. In February 2007, the IRCC website was updated to reflect the fact that the policy had been updated.

=== Military ===
Since September 2003, military chaplains have been allowed to bless same-sex unions and to perform these ceremonies on a military base.

=== Survivor benefits ===
On December 19, 2003, an Ontario court ruled that survivor benefits for Canadians whose same-sex partners died should be retroactive to April 1985, the date the Canadian Charter of Rights and Freedoms came into effect. The federal government appealed. On March 1, 2007, the Supreme Court of Canada ruled that the federal government must pay Canada Pension Plan benefits to surviving same-sex spouses. Initial news reports indicated that the court limited retroactive benefits to only 12 months' worth, but in fact, some survivors may be entitled to benefits dating back to 2000.

== Same-sex divorce in Canada ==
On September 13, 2004, a lesbian couple known as "M.M." and "J.H." (the initials of their respective lawyers) in Ontario were granted Canada's first same-sex divorce. Their initial divorce application had been denied based on the fact that the federal Divorce Act (French: Loi sur le divorce) defined spouse as "either of a man or a woman who are married to each other". However, Madam Justice Ruth Mesbur of the Ontario Superior Court of Justice ruled in M.M. v J.H that the definition of "spouse" in the Divorce Act was unconstitutional. In June 2005, a lesbian couple residing in British Columbia obtained a similar ruling.

The Civil Marriage Act in 2005 amended the Divorce Act to permit same-sex divorce. However, prior to 2013, a married couple (same-sex or opposite-sex) could file for divorce in Canada only if at least one spouse was then residing in Canada and had been for at least one full year when the divorce was filed.

In 2012, after the Attorney General of Canada, Rob Nicholson, suggested in a divorce case brought in the Ontario Superior Court of Justice that non-residents of Canada did not have valid marriages if such marriages were not recognized by their home jurisdictions, the Conservative government announced that they would fix this "legislative gap". A government bill, the Civil Marriage of Non-residents Act (French: Loi sur le mariage civil de non-résidents), positively declaring such marriages legal in Canada and allowing non-residents to divorce in a Canadian court if prohibited from doing so in their home jurisdictions, was introduced and received first reading on February 17, 2012, and passed third and final reading on June 18, 2013. The bill then received a quick passage through the Senate and passed third and final reading on June 21, receiving royal assent by Governor General David Johnston on June 26. The law came into effect on August 14 by Order of the Governor General in Council made the previous day.

== Church and state ==
Based on the 2001 census, 80 per cent of the Canadian population were initiated into one of the three main Abrahamic religions (Judaism, Islam, and Christianity). All three have texts interpreted by some to declare sexual relations between people of the same sex as forbidden and sinful, and have been opposed to the recognition of same-sex unions. However, some major religious groups spoke in favour of legalizing same-sex marriage. The largest Protestant denomination in the country, the United Church of Canada, offers church weddings to same-sex couples and supports same-sex marriages, testifying to this effect during the cross-country Justice Committee hearings. Unitarian Universalist congregations also solemnize same-sex marriages, as do the Religious Society of Friends (Quakers), the Metropolitan Community Church and the Evangelical Lutheran Church in Canada. Some progressive Jewish congregations have also supported same-sex marriage.

The General Synod of the Anglican Church of Canada passed an initial motion in July 2016 to perform same-sex marriages in their churches. The measure had to be approved a second time at the next General Synod in 2019 to come into force. The Anglican Church of Canada does not specifically prohibit same-sex marriage. On July 12, 2019, the General Synod did not approve the motion at its second reading. In spite of support by the laity and clergy, the motion did not pass because it was not supported by a full two-thirds of the bishops. Director of Communications Meghan Kilty said that many dioceses have been performing same-sex marriages, including the dioceses of Toronto, Ottawa, British Columbia and others. Kilty added that many dioceses would continue to perform such services since there is no specific prohibition by the Church.

In July 2003, the hierarchy of the Catholic Church in Canada protested the government's plans to include same-sex couples in civil marriage. This was significant because Catholicism has a larger number of adherents in Canada than any other religion or denomination, with 43.6 per cent of the population identifying themselves as Catholic in 2005. The church criticisms were accompanied by Vatican claims that Catholic politicians should vote according to their personal beliefs rather than the policy of the government. Amid a subsequent backlash in opinion, the Church remained remarkably quiet on the subject, at least in public, until late 2004, when two Catholic bishops clearly stated their opposition to same-sex marriage. The Bishop of Calgary, Frederick Henry, in a pastoral letter urged Catholics to fight against the legalization of same-sex marriage, calling homosexual behaviour "an evil act". Bishop Henry's letter also seemed to urge the outlawing of homosexual acts, saying, "Since homosexuality, adultery, prostitution and pornography undermine the foundations of the family, the basis of society, then the State must use its coercive power to proscribe or curtail them in the interests of the common good." Two human rights complaints were filed against Henry soon afterwards under the Alberta Human Rights Act, one of which was dropped at the conciliation stage.

The Hutterite Brethren spoke out against same-sex marriage in a letter written to Prime Minister Martin in February 2005. The group has historically not involved themselves with politics. The Humanist Association of Canada, which endorses a non-theistic, non-religious ethical philosophy to life and full separation of church and state, has been supportive of same-sex marriage. Local affiliate groups of the Humanist Association offer officiancy services across Canada. Representatives of the World Sikh Organization testified before the Senate Committee on Legal and Constitutional Affairs in favour of the Civil Marriage Act.

== Public opinion ==
=== 1990s ===
A 1996 Angus Reid Institute/Southam News opinion poll, conducted across Canada, found that 49 per cent of Canadians supported same-sex marriage, while 47 per cent were opposed. Support was highest in Quebec (58 per cent) and among 18–34-year-olds (67 per cent), and lowest in Alberta (38 per cent) and people over the age of 54 (25 per cent). In 1999, the group found support at 53 per cent with 44 per cent opposed.

=== 2000s ===
An April 2001 Environics Research Group survey showed that 45 per cent of Canadians supported same-sex marriage (29 per cent "strongly" and 16 per cent "somewhat"), while 41 per cent opposed (30 per cent "strongly" and 11 per cent "somewhat"). A June 2002 survey conducted by Focus on the Family Canada, a conservative Christian organization opposed to same-sex marriage, found that 46 per cent of Canadians agreed same-sex marriage should be legalized whereas 44 per cent disagreed. A poll conducted by the Centre for Research and Information on Canada in October 2002 showed that 53 per cent of Canadians supported same-sex marriage, while 41 per cent were opposed. A November 2002 Ekos/CBC poll asked respondents if they would vote "yes" or "no" in a referendum on the issue of same-sex marriage. 47 per cent answered "no" and 45 per cent answered "yes", while 8 per cent did not know.

A 2005 opinion poll taken shortly before Parliament voted on the Civil Marriage Act found that 42 per cent of Canadians favoured the nationwide legalization of same-sex marriage, while 40 per cent were opposed and 18 per cent did not respond or were undecided. A June 2006 poll conducted by Ekos asked respondents if the debate on same-sex marriage should be reopened. 62 per cent considered same-sex marriage settled, 27 per cent wanted to reopen the issue, and 11 per cent either had no opinion or did not respond.

=== 2010s ===
In 2012, a poll by Forum Research showed that 66.4 per cent of Canadians approved of legalized same-sex marriage, while 33.6 per cent were opposed. Support for same-sex marriage was highest in Quebec (72 per cent) and British Columbia (70.2 per cent), while lowest in Alberta (45.6 per cent). A May 2013 Ipsos poll of residents of 16 countries found that 63 per cent of respondents in Canada were in favour of same-sex marriage and another 13 per cent supported other forms of recognition for same-sex couples.

After same-sex marriage in the United States was legalized by their Supreme Court in Obergefell v. Hodges in June 2015, a poll by Forum Research showed that 70 per cent of Canadians approved of same-sex marriage, while 22 per cent disapproved.

In May 2016, members of the Conservative Party of Canada voted 1,036–462 to change the party's political platform from defining marriage as "a union between one man and one woman" to a neutral stance. As a compromise, the party did not elect to support the right to same-sex marriage, allowing members "the freedom to hold personal opinions against same-sex marriage".

A 2017 CROP poll showed that 74 per cent of Canadians found it "great that in Canada, two people of the same sex can get married", while 26 per cent disagreed. Support for same-sex marriage was higher among women (79 per cent) than men (70 per cent) and higher among French speakers (82 per cent) than English speakers (73 per cent). Those with a higher income, a university degree or who were born in Canada were also more likely to support same-sex marriage. When divided by age, young people were overwhelmingly in support (82 per cent among 18–24-year-olds and 86 per cent among 25–34-year-olds) and, while people over 65 were less likely to be in favour, same-sex marriage still enjoyed 66 per cent popular support among people of that age group. The most supportive province was Quebec (80 per cent), followed by 78 per cent in the four Atlantic provinces, 75 per cent in British Columbia, 73 per cent in Ontario, 70 per cent in Manitoba and Saskatchewan and 68 per cent in Alberta. The 2017 AmericasBarometer showed that 76 per cent of Canadians supported same-sex marriage.

=== 2020s ===
A 2020 Research Co. poll found that 67 per cent of Canadians supported same-sex marriage remaining legal. A 2022 Research Co. poll found that number had remained quite stable, at 66 per cent.

A Pew Research Center poll conducted between February and May 2023 showed that 79 per cent of Canadians supported same-sex marriage, 15 per cent were opposed and 6 per cent did not know or refused to answer. When divided by political affiliation, support was highest among those on the left and the centre of the political spectrum at 85 per cent, followed by those on the right at 71 per cent.

== See also ==
- LGBTQ rights in Canada
- Marriage in Canada
- Members of the 38th Canadian Parliament and same-sex marriage
- Members of the 39th Canadian Parliament and same-sex marriage
- Religion in Canada
- Timeline of LGBTQ history
  - 2005 in LGBTQ rights
- Recognition of same-sex unions in the Americas
- He never married

== Bibliography ==
- Hull, Kathleen (2006), Same-sex marriage: the cultural politics of love and law, Cambridge Univ. Press, ISBN 0521672511
- Lahey, Kathleen A; Alderson, Kevin (2004), Same-sex marriage: the personal and the political, Insomniac Press, ISBN 1-894663-63-2
- Larocque, Sylvain (2006). Gay Marriage: The Story of a Canadian Social Revolution. Toronto: James Lorimer & Company. ISBN 1-55028-927-6.
