= Same-sex marriage in the Northwest Territories =

Same-sex marriage has been legal in the Northwest Territories since July 20, 2005. The Canadian territory began issuing marriage licences to same-sex couples upon the granting of royal assent to the federal Civil Marriage Act in July 2005. The Northwest Territories had been one of only four provinces and territories, with Alberta, Nunavut and Prince Edward Island, where same-sex marriage had not already been legalised by court challenges prior to the passage of the federal law.

== Court proceedings ==
In December 2004, Justice Minister Charles Dent said that the Northwest Territories Government would not issue marriage licences to same-sex couples until a court ruling or federal legislation legalised same-sex marriage. However, he indicated that the territory would not contest any lawsuit on the subject, and would comply with such a ruling or law.

On May 20, 2005, a Yellowknife couple, Jason Perrino and Colin Snow, sued the territorial government over the right to get married, arguing that refusing them a licence was a violation of the Canadian Charter of Rights and Freedoms. The Northwest Territories Supreme Court was supposed to hear the case on May 27; however, it adjourned for three weeks at the request of a couple who wanted intervenor status in the case to oppose same-sex marriage. Ruby and Laurin Trudel of Yellowknife applied to intervene in the lawsuit. They had been members of Yellowknife's Evangelical Lutheran Church until it started to share communion and the pulpit with the United Church, a denomination which had begun blessing same-sex unions. The couple was granted intervenor status, and on June 17, CBC North reported that the intervenors had requested party status in the case. If this had been granted by the Supreme Court, it would have given them more direct involvement in the case, and the right to appeal in the event the judge sided with the plaintiffs' request to allow same-sex marriage in the territory. The case was put off again for another three weeks, and was set to resume on July 6. On June 30, financial support for the Trudels evaporated. Their lawyer withdrew his services, and the Trudels decided to proceed alone, without legal representation.

On July 6, Ruby Trudel, alone, testified before the Supreme Court. She apologised to the court for her lack of knowledge of court procedures, and said that she was not homophobic, "While we do not support, encourage or endorse their lifestyle, we hold nothing against them personally." She said that those who promoted the exclusion of same-sex couples from marriage had been "rendered voiceless at the federal level." Actually, debates on the issue of same-sex marriage were "in full swing" in the Canadian Senate at that time. She expressed concern over the possibility of persecution of Christian clergy if same-sex marriage were to become legalised, "If the application before this court were to succeed, there is every reason to believe that repercussions against people of conscience and religion....will soon begin to occur here also." She asked that the court not impose costs on them, "Costs incurred to this point already exceed our ability to pay." A ruling never came from the Supreme Court, and royal assent was granted to the Civil Marriage Act on July 20, 2005, legalising same-sex marriage nationwide in Canada. Perrino and Snow were awarded $5,000 in legal fees to cover court costs. On October 17, 2005, Supreme Court Justice Virginia Schuler ordered the federal government, and therefore Canadian taxpayers, to reimburse the plaintiffs for costs they incurred during their legal challenge. Perrino and Snow married following the legalisation of same-sex marriage in the territory.

== Territorial legislation ==
In June 2002, the Legislative Assembly of the Northwest Territories amended territorial law to allow same-sex couples to adopt children jointly. It also modified the definition of "spouse" to grant same-sex couples some legal rights and benefits. Further legislation was passed in March 2005. On March 7, 2017, the Legislative Assembly approved a new Marriage Act, (Note: In some of the Northwest Territories' official languages: Cree: ᐑᑭᐦᑐᐏᐣ ᐏᔭᓯᐍᐏᐣ, Wîkihtowin Wiyasiwêwin; Dogrib: Ełetsʼìhchìı Nàowo; French: Loi sur le mariage; Gwichʼin: Nihkhàgadhidii geenjit dàgwìdįįʼee; Inuinnaqtun: Katitiviliqinikkut Maligaq; Inuktitut: ᑲᑎᑎᓯᒪᔪᓕᕆᓂᕐᒧᑦ ᐱᖁᔭᖅ, Katitisimajulirinirmut Piqujaq; North Slavey: Ełetsʼíchu Ɂeɂá) intended to harmonize various territorial family laws and modernize legal requirements for marriage. The new law, which uses gender-neutral language when referring to married spouses, passed by a unanimous 16–0 vote, with all seven members of the Executive Council voting in favour. It received royal assent by acting Commissioner Gerald Kisoun on March 10, and went into effect on June 1, 2017. The Marriage Act states that:

"marriage" means the voluntary union of two persons to the exclusion of all others

== Marriage statistics ==
The 2016 Canadian census showed that there were 75 same-sex couples living in the Northwest Territories.

== Religious performance ==
In July 2019, the synod of the Anglican Church of Canada narrowly rejected a motion to authorise same-sex marriage and allow clergy in the Church to officiate at such marriages. Instead, the church synod passed a resolution known as "A Word to the Church", allowing its dioceses to choose whether to bless and perform same-sex marriages. Clergy of the Diocese of The Arctic, including Bishop David Parsons, have been vocally opposed to the solemnisation of same-sex marriages within the church. Following the passage of the resolution, several dioceses, including those of Ottawa and Rupert's Land, announced they would permit their clergy to solemnise same-sex marriages in accordance with the new resolution passed by the church synod. The Diocese of The Arctic chose to distance itself from these dioceses, but, responding to concerns that it might be leaving the Anglican Church of Canada, it released a statement, "The Diocese of the Arctic remains a diocese within the Anglican Church of Canada, but must distance itself from those who violate the marriage canon. The implication of this is a state of 'impaired communion'."

Some other religious organisations perform same-sex marriages in their places of worship, including the United Church of Canada, Quakers, the Evangelical Lutheran Church in Canada, and the Canadian Unitarian Council.

== See also ==
- Same-sex marriage in Canada
- LGBT rights in Canada
