= Same-sex marriage in Manitoba =

Same-sex marriage has been legal in Manitoba since September 16, 2004. In the case of Vogel v. Canada, the Court of Queen's Bench of Manitoba ordered the province to begin issuing marriage licences to same-sex couples. This decision followed a suit brought by three couples who had been denied the right to marry. Both the provincial and federal governments had made it known that they would not oppose the court bid. The ruling followed similar cases in four other provinces and territories, making Manitoba the fifth jurisdiction in Canada, after Ontario, British Columbia, Quebec and Yukon, to extend civil marriage to same-sex couples. The court said that its decision had been influenced by the previous decisions in those four provinces and territories.

Manitoba has also recognised common-law relationships offering some of the rights and benefits of marriage since 2001.

== Court ruling ==
=== Background and judgment ===
In 1974, Chris Vogel and Richard North were married in the First Unitarian Universalist Church of Winnipeg but the government refused to register their marriage. The couple had previously attempted to receive a civil marriage licence in February 1974, but were rejected. They filed a lawsuit, but the trial court dismissed their case based on dictionary definitions of marriage. The couple received a legal opinion that an appeal was "hopeless". In an October 2004 interview, the couple said "we believed if people would look at us realistically, our problems would end...[Back then] few people could say 'homosexual' without choking [and] we were spoken of as if we were evil."

On August 26, 2004, North and Vogel, along with two other same-sex couples, initiated a lawsuit, Vogel v. Canada, seeking the right to marry in Manitoba. The couples argued that the province's ban on issuing marriage licences to same-sex couples violated the Charter rights of gays and lesbians. Justice Minister Gord Mackintosh said, "We will not oppose what they are seeking....We don't have an interest in opposing legally recognized rights of Canadians.....I think the weight of the decisions across the country have pointed to the conclusion that the current federal law is not in accordance with the Charter, so I am pleased that we're going to have some definitive ruling here in Manitoba." On September 16, 2004, Justice Douglas Yard of the Court of Queen's Bench of Manitoba ordered the province to begin issuing marriage licences to same-sex couples, ruling that the same-sex marriage ban violated the Canadian Charter of Rights and Freedoms. Vogel and North did not remarry because they had been married 30 years earlier in the Unitarian Church. The other couples involved in the case were Stefphany Cholakis and Michelle Ritchot, and Laura Fouhse and Jordan Cantwell. Both couples were issued marriage licences following the court order, with Cholakis and Ritchot being the first same-sex couple to marry in Manitoba, on September 16, 2004. Fouhse and Cantwell were married two days later; "I'm extremely pleased that our wedding this weekend will not only be celebrated and witnessed by our friends and family and by God in the sanctity of our church, but it will also be recognized by our government. It just makes the whole event seem so much more complete", said Fouhse. Both are ministers in the United Church of Canada, with Cantwell serving as moderator between 2015 and 2018.

=== Reactions and aftermath ===
The Archbishop of Winnipeg, James Weisgerber, condemned the court ruling, stating that the prohibition of same-sex marriage was "a foundational principle of our society....It is difficult to understand how the unique importance of marriage to both children and society will not be gravely undermined by including in the definition of marriage unions which are not equipped for reproduction." A controversy emerged shortly after the ruling, when the province's Vital Statistics Office sent letters to government marriage commissioners requesting that those unwilling to perform same-sex marriages return their certificates of registration. This directive excluded religious clergy who are in any case not required to perform a marriage that would violate the doctrine of their faith. In response, the federal Conservative justice critic Vic Toews announced he would file a complaint with the Manitoba Human Rights Commission if this policy was not rescinded. Kevin Kisilowsky, a marriage commissioner whose certification was cancelled in 2005 when he refused to return his certificate of registration, subsequently filed a complaint with the Human Rights Commission, arguing that performing same-sex marriages would violate his religious beliefs, but the Commission dismissed his case in 2005. Kisilowsky filed a legal challenge, Kisilowsky v. Manitoba, with the Court of Queen's Bench in September 2016, again arguing that the government's requirement was unconstitutional. Justice Karen Simonsen ruled for the government in November 2016, stating that Kisilowsky "can practice his faith as he chooses but is simply not permitted to use his faith as a basis to refuse to marry couples whose weddings, due to religious or moral views, offend him." Justice Simonsen said Kisilowsky could apply for temporary certification or register as a religious official, which would allow him to perform marriages to whomever he wishes. The Manitoba Court of Appeal upheld Simonsen's decision in February 2018.

In 2015, Richard North filed a discrimination complaint with the Manitoba Human Rights Commission when the government again refused to register his 1974 marriage to Chris Vogel. The Commission subsequently referred the case to an adjudicator, who heard the complaint in November 2017. The adjudicator ruled against the couple in January 2018. In June 2021, Justice Gerald Chartier of the Manitoba Court of Queen's Bench agreed with the adjudicator's decision, ruling that the province had not discriminated against the couple by failing to recognize their 1974 marriage. The marriage certificate issued to them by the Unitarian Church in 1974 is now on display at the Canadian Museum for Human Rights.

== Provincial legislation ==
Since 2001, same-sex couples have had access to government-sanctioned relationships. While not as extensive as the rights and benefits of marriage, these common-law relationships provide some important benefits to unmarried couples, including in the areas of alimony, financial information and property. These written agreements, recognized by the Family Maintenance Act and the Family Property Act, outline the rights and responsibilities of common-law partners. However, common-law partners lack some of the rights and benefits afforded to married couples. Notably, goods that were purposely intended and acquired for common use by the couple will generally be divided upon separation, but goods acquired by one partner only will generally not be divided and only the partner that purchased the goods will be entitled to them. This is not the case for married couples who enjoy an equal division of property.

On 2 October 2008, the Legislative Assembly of Manitoba amended the Marriage Act (French: Loi sur le mariage) (Note: In some of Manitoba's recognised minority languages: Cree: ᐑᑭᐦᑐᐏᐣ ᐏᔭᓯᐍᐏᐣ, Wîkihtowin Wiyasiwêwin; Dakota: Wakaŋkičiyuzapi Woope; Inuktitut: ᑲᑎᑎᓯᒪᔪᓕᕆᓂᕐᒧᑦ ᐱᖁᔭᖅ, Katitisimajulirinirmut Piqujaq; Michif: Lway di maaryaazh; Ojibwe: Wiidigendiwin Onaakonigewin; Oji-Cree: ᐏᑭᐦᑐᐏᐣ ᐅᓈᐦᑯᓂᑫᐏᐣ, Wikihtowin Onaahkonikewin) and several other acts relating to family law. Specifically, it replaced references to "husband and wife" with the gender-neutral language term "spouses" in various sections of the act. The legislation was assented by Lieutenant Governor John Harvard on October 9, making Manitoba the fourth province, after Quebec, Ontario and Prince Edward Island, to bring its marriage laws in line with the legalisation of same-sex marriage. Subsection 7(3) was amended to read that each of the parties to the marriage, in the presence of the marriage commissioner and the witnesses, say to the other:

I call upon these persons here present to witness that I, A.B., do take thee, C.D., to be my lawful wedded (wife/husband/spouse). [CCSM, c M50, s 7(3)]

== First Nations ==
While the Indian Act governs many aspects of life for First Nations in Canada, it does not directly govern marriage or provide a framework for conducting customary marriages. Instead, marriage laws are primarily governed by provincial and territorial legislation. However, the Indian Act has some indirect impacts on marriage, particularly regarding band membership and property rights on reserves.

While there are no records of same-sex marriages being performed in First Nations cultures in the way they are commonly defined in Western legal systems, many Indigenous communities recognize identities and relationships that may be placed on the LGBT spectrum. Among these are two-spirit individuals—people who embody both masculine and feminine qualities. In some cultures, two-spirit individuals assigned male at birth wear women's clothing and engage in household and artistic work associated with the feminine sphere. Historically, this identity sometimes allowed for unions between two people of the same biological sex. Among the Plains Cree people, two-spirit individuals—known as iyîhkwêw (ᐃᔩᐦᑫᐧᐤ, pronounced [ˈɪ.jiːhˌkweːw])—are regarded as "esteemed persons with special spiritual powers" and are "noted shamans". It was likely that they were able to marry cisgender men, though David G. Mandelbaum reported in 1940 that an iyîhkwêw named Clawed Woman had remained unmarried her entire life. The Ojibwe refer to two-spirit people as niizh manidoowag (pronounced [niːʒ maˈnɪˌdoːˌwak]), a term that inspired the modern umbrella term "two-spirit". Many niizh manidoowag were wives in polygynous households. They are known as wiŋkta (pronounced [ˈwĩkta]) in the Dakota language. Many wiŋkta married cisgender men without indication of polygyny, but some remained unmarried and lived in their own tipis, and were visited by married men for sexual intercourse when the men's wives were pregnant or menstruating, and therefore when sexual intercourse was forbidden to them.

== Marriage statistics ==
Approximately 900 same-sex couples had married in the twelve years following the court ruling. An average of 79 same-sex marriages were performed every year, with the peak being 2014 at 107 same-sex marriages. The 2016 Canadian census showed that 1,710 same-sex couples were living in Manitoba.

== Religious performance ==
In July 2019, the synod of the Anglican Church of Canada passed a resolution known as "A Word to the Church", allowing its dioceses to choose whether to bless and perform same-sex marriages. That same month, Bishop Geoffrey Woodcroft said that clergy in the Diocese of Rupert's Land would be permitted to perform same-sex marriages from January 2020. Bishop William Cliff of the Diocese of Brandon supports same-sex marriage, but has said that he would only allow same-sex marriages to be performed in his diocese with the support of the diocesan synod. Currently, the canons of the diocese state that "no cleric within the jurisdiction of the Diocese of Brandon shall solemnise a marriage between two persons except as provided for in the canons of the General Synod". Bishop Lydia Mamakwa of the Indigenous Spiritual Ministry of Mishamikoweesh, encompassing First Nations communities in northeastern Manitoba, opposes same-sex marriage, and the diocese does not perform same-sex marriages.

Some other religious organisations also perform same-sex marriages in their places of worship, including the United Church of Canada, Quakers, the Evangelical Lutheran Church in Canada, and the Canadian Unitarian Council. In 1974, Unitarian Reverend Norm Naylor officiated at the marriage of Chris Vogel and Richard North in Winnipeg, marking the "first same-sex marriage in Canada". In March 2023, the Jubilee Mennonite Church, a congregation of the Canadian Conference of Mennonite Brethren Churches located in Winnipeg, was expelled from the denomination over its decision to affirm same-sex marriages.

== See also ==
- Same-sex marriage in Canada
- LGBT rights in Canada
