= Domestic partnership in Nova Scotia =

Since June 4, 2001, the Canadian province of Nova Scotia has offered Domestic partnership registration to unmarried couples, both same-sex and different-sex, thereby entitling them to some, but not all, of the rights and benefits of marriage.

== Legislation ==
In the previous year, the General Assembly passed the Law Reform (2000) Act, the full title of which is "An Act to Comply with Certain Court Decisions and to Modernize and Reform Laws in the Province." The act was passed in the wake of the landmark decision of the Supreme Court of Canada in the case of M. v. H. on May 19, 1999.

In the first six months after the law came into effect, only 94 domestic partnerships were registered, in contrast to about 5500 marriages per year in the province. Of the 94 partnerships, 83 (88%) were same-sex couples.

== Rights and Benefits ==
At the time the 2000 act was passed, domestic partners who registered with the provincial authorities were entitled to the same rights and obligations as spouses under the following laws:

- the Fatal Injuries Act
- the Health Act
- the Hospitals Act
- the Insurance Act
- the Intestate Succession Act
- the Maintenance and Custody Act
- the Matrimonial Property Act
- the Members' Retiring Allowances Act
- the Pension Benefits Act
- the Probate Act
- the Provincial Court Act
- or as a widow or widower under the Testators' Family Maintenance Act

== Registration ==
Unmarried adults over age 19 in a conjugal relationship, not party to another domestic partnership, who live in Nova Scotia or own property there may file a declaration of domestic partnership with the Nova Scotia Vital Statistics Agency. By registering, the couple immediately gains the family court legal recognition, rights and benefits available to common law spouses under provincial law.

== Termination ==
Domestic partnerships in Nova Scotia may be terminated in one of the following ways:

- both parties jointly file a Statement of Termination with Vital Statistics
- one party files an affidavit with Vital Statistics that the couple have lived separate and apart for more than a year
- the parties enter into a separation agreement pursuant to the Maintenance and Custody Act and file proof of such an agreement with Vital Statistics
- one of the parties files with Vital Statistics proof of marriage to a third party, which automatically ends the domestic partnership

== See also ==
- Same-sex marriage in Nova Scotia
- Same-sex marriage in Canada
