= Michael Hendricks and René Leboeuf =

Canadian-American gay rights advocates

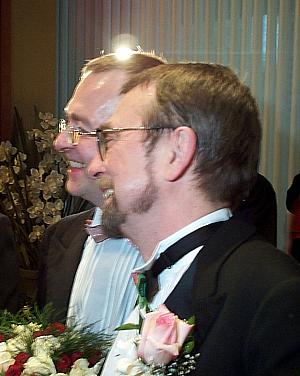
- Michael Hendricks (right) and René LeBoeuf at their 2004 wedding
- Occupation: Gay rights activists
- Known for: First same-sex couple to be married in Quebec
- Michael Hendricks
- Born: November 7, 1941; Trenton, New Jersey, U.S.
- Died: July 18, 2026 (aged 84)
- René Leboeuf
- Born: 1955 or 1956 (age 70–71); Quebec City, Quebec, Canada

Michael Hendricks and René LeBoeuf are Canadian–American gay rights advocates. At the height of the AIDS epidemic in the 1980s and 90s, the couple helped lead ACT UP activists in a fight with the City of Montreal to create a permanent memorial to Quebecers who died of AIDS. After several years trying to stop the grassroots efforts to create the memorial, city officials abandoned their fight in September 1994 and the Parc de l'Espoir was built in the heart of Montreal's gay village.

The couple is also known for their advocacy of marriage equality in Canada and became the first same-sex couple to be legally married in Quebec.

In October 2019, at the age of 80, Hendricks found himself at the centre of a new battle with the City of Montreal for the Parc de l'Espoir. Without consulting the gay community or HIV/AIDS service organizations, the city's Ville-Marie borough sent a Notice to Residents announcing it had developed plans to demolish the AIDS memorial and rebuild it with an entirely new design. Hendricks and LeBoeuf mobilized the community to attend the borough's December 4 public meeting where officials were told repeatedly that they did not have their approval to make any changes to Parc de l'Espoir. Fearing a scathing editorial in the Montreal Gazette, the borough dropped their plans and went back to the drawing board.

== Background ==
Hendricks was born on November 7, 1941 and raised in Trenton, New Jersey. He came to Canada as a draft evader during the Vietnam War; he met LeBoeuf, a native of Quebec City, at a New Year's party in the 1970s.

In 1996, the couple began to lead protests and parades seeking the right to marry each other.

== Hendricks and LeBoeuf v. Quebec ==
Hendricks c Québec (Procureur général)
- Court: Superior Court of Quebec
- Decided: September 6, 2002

Case history
- Appealed to: Quebec Court of Appeal

Court membership
- Judge sitting: Louise Lemelin

In November 2001, the couple brought suit against the government of Quebec, asserting that its refusal to perform same-sex marriage violated the Canadian Charter of Rights and Freedoms. The case began on November 8.

On December 7 of that year, the Quebec government announced its intention to bring in legislation to create civil unions to which same-sex couples would have access and which would afford a status equivalent to that of marriage. (The definition of marriage is a federal jurisdiction in Canada, but the provinces have authority over civil status, including the registry of marriage.) The bill was introduced on April 25, 2002, and passed on June 7.

Hendricks and LeBoeuf v. Quebec continued, and on September 6, 2002, the Quebec Superior Court ruled that the limitation of marriage to opposite-sex couples violated the Charter. It declared that the laws preventing same-sex marriage would become inoperative in Quebec in two years' time, constraining the federal government to act within that time. Hendricks and LeBoeuf were represented in the original Quebec Superior Court case by family lawyers Marie-Hélène Dubé and Anne-France Goldwater.

Although the federal government announced that it would appeal the decision and other legal decisions regarding same-sex marriage, those appeals were later dropped on the recommendation of the House of Commons Justice Committee, which had held travelling hearings on same-sex marriage.

On January 26, 2004, Hendricks and LeBoeuf appealed against the decision of the court in their case, specifically the delay of two years, in view of the rulings that had implemented same-sex marriage immediately in Ontario and British Columbia during the summer of 2003. They were represented in the appeal by lawyers Colin Irving and Martha McCarthy.

On March 19, the Quebec Court of Appeal struck down the delay and ruled that same-sex marriage licences be issued immediately.

== Wedding ==
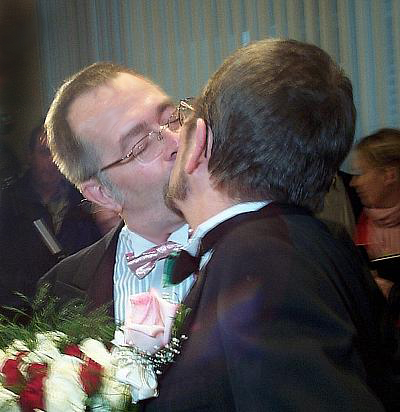
Michael Hendricks and René LeBoeuf marry on 1 April 2004

Hendricks and LeBoeuf immediately sought their licence. The usual 20-day waiting period required between the issuance of a licence and the wedding was waived, and the couple were wed at the Palais de justice de Montréal on April 1, 2004, exactly three years after the first legal same-sex marriage in the Netherlands. At the time of their wedding, they had been together for 31 years.

== Death ==
Hendricks died on July 18, 2026, after requesting medical assistance in dying subsequent to a pulmonary degenerative disease.

René Leboeuf (left) at Queering Wiki 2026 in Montreal.

== See also ==
- The Michaels
