= Common-law relationships in Canada =

Legally recognized cohabitation

Common-law relationships in Canada (conjoints de fait in Quebec) are cohabitation relationships which confer legal rights and obligations on couples who are not formally married. The relationships are recognised by provincial and federal law, for same-sex and different-sex unmarried couples. The scope of the rights and obligations varies from province to province, since these types of relationships are governed largely by provincial law.

Canada does not have the institution of common-law marriage, where a couple can be legally married by living together with an intention to be married, and without a formal ceremony.

However, informal cohabitation relationships are recognised for certain purposes in Canada, creating legal rights and obligations. The usual indicators are length of cohabitation, typically two years, or cohabitation with a child. In addition, some provinces have a formal registration system for cohabitation. These types of relationships are typically called "living common-law" in provinces other than Quebec, and "conjoints de fait" in Quebec, which does not use the common law.

Around one-fifth of Canadian couples are in common-law relationships, a three-fold increase from 1981, according to 2016 data from Statistics Canada.

== Constitutional and legal framework ==
Under the Constitution of Canada, jurisdiction over personal relationships is divided between the federal Parliament and the provincial legislatures. Parliament has exclusive legislative authority over marriage and divorce under section 91(26) of the Constitution Act, 1867, giving Parliament the power to regulate the formation and dissolution of marriages. Parliament has done so by enacting a number of federal laws, including the Civil Marriage Act. Parliament has also created offences under the Criminal Code relating to marriage.

The Constitution gives the provinces jurisdiction over most aspects of unmarried cohabitation relationships, which are often referred to as "common-law marriage" or "living common law". Since family law varies between provinces, there are differences between the provinces regarding the recognition of common-law relationships, such as the definition of "spouse" and the rights and obligations of marriage-like relationships. Most laws deal with relations that are romantic or sexual in nature, but some, such as adult interdependent relationships in Alberta, can apply to platonic relations, including relatives.

Federal and provincial laws relating to personal relationships are both subject to review under the Canadian Charter of Rights and Freedoms. In its decision in M. v. H. in 1999, the Supreme Court of Canada held that the equality provision of the Charter, section 15, required that provincial law treat unmarried same-sex couples in the same way as unmarried opposite-sex couples. Same-sex common-law couples therefore had the same rights and obligations as opposite-sex common-law couples under provincial family law relating to spousal support. However, in a later case, Nova Scotia (Attorney General) v. Walsh, the Supreme Court held that treating married couples differently from common-law couples, giving married couples greater rights and obligations on dissolution of the marriage, was not discriminatory under section 15.

== Federal ==
Common-law partners may be eligible for various federal government spousal benefits. Various federal laws include "common-law status", which automatically takes effect when two people (of any sex) have lived together in a conjugal relationship for a minimum period.

Canada Revenue Agency (CRA) states, as of 2007, "living common-law" means living with a person in a conjugal relationship without being married and at least one of the following is true:

1. the couple has been living in a conjugal relationship for at least 12 continuous months;
2. the couple are parents of a child by birth or adoption; or
3. one of the couple has custody and control of the other's child (or had custody and control immediately before the child turned 19 years of age) and the child is wholly dependent on that person for support.

Canada recognizes unmarried partners under certain circumstances for the purpose of immigration. Citizenship & Immigration Canada states that a common-law partner refers to a person who is living in a conjugal relationship with another person (opposite or same sex), and has done so continuously for a period of at least one year. A conjugal relationship exists when there is a significant degree of commitment between two people. This can be shown with evidence that the couple share the same home, that they support each other financially and emotionally, that they have children together, or that they present themselves in public as a couple. Common-law partners who are unable to live together or appear in public together because of legal restrictions in their home country or who have been separated for reasons beyond their control (for example, civil war or armed conflict) may still qualify and should be included on an application.

== British Columbia ==
The term "common-law marriage" does not appear in British Columbia (BC) law. A distinction is made between being a spouse and being married. Married couples include only those who have engaged in a legal marriage ceremony and have received a marriage licence. Spouses include married couples as well as those, of same or opposite sex, who satisfy criteria for being in a marriage-like relationship for a time period that depends on the law that is being considered. Hence the meaning of the term unmarried spouse in BC depends on the legal context. The criteria for a relationship being accepted as marriage-like include cohabitation for at least the specified period, unbroken by excessively long intervals that are unexplained by exigent circumstances. If dispute arises about whether the relationship was marriage-like, a court would consider a comprehensive set of further criteria including the domestic and financial arrangements, degree and nature of intimacy, and the sense of the relationship presented to friends and families (especially by each spouse to his/her own family). "Mere roommates will never qualify as unmarried spouses. There needs to be some other dimension to the relationship indicative of a commitment between the parties and their shared belief that they are in a special relationship with each other." The criteria do not exclude the existence of a previous marriage to a third person during the period of the marriage-like relationship of the unmarried spouses. Hence a person may have more than one spouse at the same time.

The implications of becoming an unmarried spouse include:

- Child support. A spouse is responsible for contributing towards support of a child and possibly the other spouse if he/she is a biological or adoptive parent, or has contributed to support of the child for at least one year during the "marriage-like relationship" with the child's parent and the parent applies to the court for continuing support after separation and within one year of the last support contribution. (The contribution towards child support expected from a non-parent is not as great as from a parent.)
- Financial support and division of property and debts after separation. If the "marriage-like relationship" has continued for two years, the laws that apply upon separation are the same as those that apply to married couples, according to the "Estate Administration Act". All property and debts acquired prior to the relationship are exempt. If no agreement between the partners about property and/or debts is written during or after the relationship, then the law specifies equal sharing of all acquired during the relationship, as well as any changes in the value of those brought into the relationship. (There is an exemption from equal sharing for certain categories, such as gifts and inheritances received by one spouse.) The degree of participation of each spouse in the acquisition of property or debt does not affect the sharing. Financial support may also be requested from the former spouse. A claim for financial support or the division of property and debt must be made within two years of the date of separation.
- Inheritance. A spouse is eligible for inheritance if the "marriage-like relationship" has existed for at least two years immediately prior to the death of the other spouse. All property and debts held in common are fully inherited automatically by the surviving spouse. Those brought into the relationship are subject to any existing valid will, which may be vulnerable to challenge if it does not provide for the surviving spouse and any children.
- Benefits from government programs. Access to benefits from government programs or policies can become more (or less) available upon becoming an unmarried spouse. In general, these become similar or identical to those of married couples, but the criteria for qualifying as unmarried spouses, such as longevity of the relationship, differ for the various programs. Social assistance is often immediately reduced when there is perceived to be a "spouse in the house", regardless of the nature of the relationship.

== Manitoba ==
Registration is voluntary; many of the laws apply automatically to any couple in the province after living together for several years.

In 2001, Manitoba enacted legislation extending the coverage of existing laws to same-sex couples, including changes to the following acts:

- Family Maintenance Act (non-divorce support)
- Dependants Relief Act (support from estates)
- Civil Service Superannuation Act (civil servant pensions)
- Legislative Assembly Act (pensions for MLAs—members of the Legislative Assembly)
- Pension Benefits Act (provincially regulated pensions)
- Teachers' Pension Act (teachers' pensions)
- Fatal Accidents Act (death benefits)
- Manitoba Public Insurance Corporation Act (death benefits)
- Workers Compensation Act (death benefits)
- Queen's Bench Act (the court that hears support applications)

In 2002, amendments were made to 56 Manitoba laws by the Charter Compliance Act (covering such things as adoption rights and conflict of interests requirements).

On June 30, 2004, the Common-Law Partners' Property and Related Amendments Act came into effect, changing the name of the Marital Property Act to the Family Property Act. The new act extended this and many other property laws to all common-law partners, whether same-sex or different-sex, who have either registered their relationship with the Vital Statistics Agency or who have lived together for a specified period of time, usually three years.

According to Manitoba Justice, "Common-law partners who have registered their common-law relationship with the Vital Statistics Agency, or lived together and have a child together, or lived together for at least three years if there are no children of the relationship have all the same rights under the Family Maintenance Act as legally married spouses, including the right to seek spousal support." Federal Criminal Code law against polygamy prohibits family court recognition of any form of marriage being a "subsequent and simultaneous" conjugal union, whilst either common law partner remains married to a legal spouse. While they are eligibly living together, each partner has significant rights and responsibilities in such areas as child custody, financial support and access to financial information about the partner, use of family assets, consent to sale or rental of the family home, and pension benefits under plans governed by Manitoba law (and in some cases, federal law).

According to the Vital Statistics Agency, "Once a relationship is registered, all the major property laws immediately apply to the couple in the same way they apply to married couples. Registration is voluntary, and couples are not required to register. However, even if a couple does not register, the property laws will apply to them after they have lived together, usually for three years. In some cases, though, it is less than three years; couples with concerns about property or other rights should seek legal advice." Furthermore, "if a common-law couple separates, each partner is entitled to half the value of the property acquired by the couple during the time they lived together, just like married couples. It also means that if one of the partners dies, the surviving common-law partner has a claim to his or her estate." Cohabitation as a "couple" does not grant either party recognition of family property rights or conjugal union status, whilst one or both cohabitants remain married to other(s). {s.293 Criminal Code of Canada}

Registration is done via filing a form with the Manitoba Vital Statistics Agency. Both parties must be 18 or older, living in a conjugal relationship in Manitoba, and not married or party to another common-law relationship. Proof of identity is required, as well as proof of the death of a former spouse or common-law partner, or the dissolution of a previous marriage or common-law relationship. Cohabitants who are married to another become eligible to start the Manitoba passage of time only after obtaining a divorce from previous partner(s).

According to the Vital Statistics Agency, "A registered common-law relationship can be terminated only by registering a dissolution, and only once the couple has lived apart for at least one year. If the relationship was never registered, it can be terminated only by living apart for a length of time, in many cases three years. The termination date affects some rights, such as the right to apply to court for a division of property. Either former partner has up to 60 days, after a dissolution is registered, to apply for an accounting and equalization of assets under the Family Property Act."

== New Brunswick ==
In New Brunswick, a couple must live together for three years or have a natural or adopted child together. They cannot have been married to another person during this time.

== Ontario ==
In Ontario, section 29 of the Family Law Act specifically recognizes unmarried spouses in dealing with spousal support issues. The definition is having cohabited continuously for not less than three years or "in a relationship of some permanence" if parents of a child. However, common-law spouses do not have automatic rights under the Family Law Act to their spouses' property (section 29 applies only to the support sections of the Act). Thus, common-law partners do not have a statutory right to divide property in a breakup, and must ask courts to look to concepts such as the constructive or resulting trust to divide property in an equitable manner between partners.

Married people may also have a recognized common-law spouse even before being divorced from the first spouse.

Another difference that distinguishes common-law spouses from married partners is that a common-law partner can be compelled to testify against his or her partner in a court of law.

== Quebec ==
The Civil Code of Quebec has never recognized a common-law partnership as a form of marriage. However, many laws in Quebec explicitly apply to common-law partners (called conjoints de fait) in "de facto unions" (marriages being "de jure unions") as they do to married spouses. Same-sex partners are also recognized as conjoints de fait in de facto unions, for the purpose of social benefit laws. However, common-law partners do not have any legal rights between them, such as alimony, family patrimony, compensatory allowance and matrimonial regime. The Quebec Court of Appeal ruled this restriction to be unconstitutional in 2010; but on January 25, 2013 the Supreme Court of Canada ruled that common-law couples do not have the same rights as married couples.

A 2002 amendment to the Civil Code recognizes a type of domestic partnership called a civil union that is similar to marriage and is likewise available to same-sex partners. No citizen of Quebec can be recognized under family law to be in both a civilly married state and a conjoint de fait within the same time frame. Divorce from one conjugal relationship must occur before another conjugal relationship may occur in family law.

Same-sex partners can also marry legally in Quebec, as elsewhere in Canada.

== Saskatchewan ==
In Saskatchewan, common-law relations are regulated by The Family Property Act and The Family Maintenance Act. Queen's Bench justices have sanctioned common-law relationships as simultaneously existing in family law while one or more of the spouses were also civilly married to others.

== See also ==
- Marriage à la façon du pays
- Same-sex marriage in Canada
- Same-sex marriage in Manitoba
