= Douglas Yard =

Douglas Dale Yard was appointed a judge of the Family Division of the Court of Queen's Bench of Manitoba on October 7, 1998. His appointment was effective on October 13, 1998. He replaced Madam Justice C.M. Bowman, who had chosen to become a supernumerary judge.

Yard graduated in law from the University of Manitoba in 1974 and was called to the Bar of Manitoba in 1975. Yard had been practising law with the Winnipeg law firm of Levine, Levene, Tadman, primarily in the areas of civil and criminal litigation, with an emphasis on family and child protection matters. Yard also served as counsel to The Children's Aid Society.

Yard has been a Bencher of the Law Society since 1992 and has lectured extensively on various subjects related to family law and child protection.
