= Same-sex marriage in Quebec =

Same-sex marriage has been legal in Quebec since March 19, 2004, following a ruling by the Quebec Court of Appeal, in Catholic Civil Rights League v. Hendricks, that the heterosexual definition of marriage violated the Canadian Charter of Rights and Freedoms. Quebec was the third Canadian province and the fifth jurisdiction in the world, after the Netherlands, Belgium, Ontario and British Columbia, to open marriage to same-sex couples.

Quebec has also recognised civil unions offering most of the rights and benefits of marriage since 24 June 2002.

== Court ruling ==
In 2000, Michael Hendricks and René Leboeuf applied for a marriage licence in Montreal, but were turned down by a clerk who cited sections of the law that defined marriage as being between "a man and a woman". Following the rejection, they filed a lawsuit against the Government of Quebec, arguing that its refusal to perform and recognise same-sex marriage violated the Canadian Charter of Rights and Freedoms (French: Charte canadienne des droits et libertés). Two conservative organisations, the Evangelical Fellowship of Canada and the Catholic Civil Rights League, were granted intervenor status in the case, Hendricks and Leboeuf v. Quebec. The lawsuit was heard in the Quebec Superior Court on 8, 9, 12, 13, 14, 15 and 16 November 2001. The provincial and federal governments had initially opposed the court bid; provincial Attorney General Paul Bégin argued that "gays and lesbians were not suffering any form of discrimination in [Quebec]", while federal Attorney General Anne McLellan argued that the definition of marriage was at the Parliament of Canada's discretion and not a matter for the courts to address.

A lawyer representing the conservative religious groups argued that if the court ruled in favor of same-sex marriage "[h]is heterosexual clients would no longer be able to marry. That is because, to them, marriage is a heterosexual institution." Daniel Cere, a Catholic professor at McGill University, who filed an affidavit for the court, said that same-sex marriage "would fracture the basis of shared religious and civil peace in the province". Rabbi David Novak also filed an affidavit, stating that same-sex marriage would "create a schism between Jews and the rest of society", and said that Judaism "expect[ed] them [gay people] to remain celibate for life". Other affidavits from religious groups included one from an anonymous Muslim imam stating that same-sex marriage "would invalidate Muslim beliefs, preventing Muslims from full participation in Canadian society", while one from a conservative Protestant professor at Regent College said that same-sex marriage "would drive a stake into the heart of Protestant beliefs".

Attorney Noël Saint-Pierre argued that denying marriage rights to same-sex couples constituted unfair discrimination, as they were unable to access legal benefits often taken for granted by married opposite-sex couples, such as alimony, immigration rights, child support, hospital visitation rights and protection from domestic violence, among others. Saint-Pierre also refuted the religious groups' claims, citing the Netherlands, where same-sex marriage has been legal since 2001: "The fears of the religious conservatives did not materialize. Christians did not stop marrying. Jews did not flee the country." Judge Louise Lemelin ruled in the couple's favour on September 6, 2002. The court gave the federal government two years in which to modify federal law to allow gays and lesbians to marry. A lawyer representing the plaintiff couple told the Montreal Gazette:

What makes the Quebec victory important for all of Canada is that [Judge Lemelin] had the chance to look at a civil-union law and to comment herself as to whether that would be enough of a solution for gay and lesbian couples. But Judge Lemelin said in very strong terms that a civil union, as wonderful as it is because of all the economic rights that it gives, is still not marriage.

The federal government appealed the decision of the Superior Court on September 9, 2002, but abandoned that appeal in 2003, the year same-sex marriage was legalized in Ontario and British Columbia. However, the case continued, with the religious groups still opposing the plaintiffs' claims. The groups argued that the legalisation of same-sex marriage was unconstitutional under the Constitution Act, 1867, would prevent heterosexual couples from marrying and would "weaken the meaning of marriage". On March 19, 2004, the Quebec Court of Appeal ruled similarly to the Ontario and British Columbia courts, upholding the case, now Catholic Civil Rights League v. Hendricks, in a unanimous 5–0 vote, and ordering that it take effect immediately. Hendricks and Leboeuf immediately sought a marriage licence; the usual 20-day waiting period was waived, and they were wed on April 1 at the Palais de justice in Montreal. Hendricks said, "The floodgates seem to be open and it looks like Canada is going to become the first North American country that has equal marriage... This is wonderful." Following the court decision, provincial Attorney General Marc Bellemare announced that the government would abide by the ruling. The Quebec decision meant that more than two-thirds of the Canadian population were living in provinces where same-sex marriage is legal. Subsequent cases, as well as federal legislation, have expanded this number to cover the entire country.

== Provincial legislation ==
=== Civil unions ===
On 7 June 2002, the National Assembly of Quebec passed a bill legalising civil unions (French: union civile, pronounced [ynjɔ̃ sivil]) for both same-sex and opposite-sex partners, offering many of the same rights, benefits and responsibilities as marriage, including the right to adopt children jointly. The legislation passed by a unanimous 82–0 vote, and went into force on 24 June 2002. Civil unions can be performed by court clerks, notaries, mayors, members of municipal councils or borough councils, municipal officials or authorised religious officiants. Once documents are signed by both partners and the witnesses, the union is formally registered with the Registrar of Civil Status. Quebec civil unions are not recognised in other parts of Canada or other countries.

7 June 2002 vote in the National Assembly
Party	Voted for	Voted against	Absent (Did not vote)
Parti Québécois	53: Maxime Arseneau; Diane Barbeau; Gilles Baril; Louise Beaudoin; François Beaulne; Yves Beaumier; Stéphane Bédard; Paul Bégin; Jean-Paul Bergeron; Rosaire Bertrand; Manon Blanchet; André Boisclair; Claude Boucher; André Boulerice; Marc Boulianne; Jocelyne Caron; Denise Carrier-Perreault; Jean-Pierre Charbonneau; Solange Charest; Claude Cousineau; Jacques Côté; Rémy Désilets; Rita Dionne-Marsolais; Danielle Doyer; Normand Duguay; Joseph Facal; François Gendron; Serge Geoffrion; Linda Goupil; Guy Julien; Normand Jutras; Gilles Labbé; Claude Lachance; Bernard Landry; Benoît Laprise; François Legault; Richard Legendre; Nicole Léger; Guy Lelièvre; Diane Lemieux; Agnès Maltais; Pauline Marois; Serge Ménard; Michel Morin; Sylvain Pagé; Lucie Papineau; Roger Paquin; Jean-Guy Paré; David Payne; Matthias Rioux; Jean Rochon; Jean-François Simard; Rémy Trudel	–	15: Jacques Baril; Roger Bertrand; Raymond Brouillet; David Cliche; Michel Côté; Léandre Dion; Serge Deslières; Robert Kieffer; Lyse Leduc; Michel Létourneau; Claude Pinard; Hélène Robert; Sylvain Simard; Jean-Claude St-André; Cécile Vermette
Quebec Liberal Party	28: Madeleine Bélanger; Robert Benoit; Michel Bissonnet; Julie Boulet; Jacques Chagnon; Jean Charest; Jean-Marc Fournier; Monique Gagnon-Tremblay; Henri-François Gautrin; Réal Gauvin; Jean-Claude Gobé; Monique Jérôme-Forget; Geoffrey Kelley; Michèle Lamquin-Éthier; Pierre-Étienne Laporte; Diane Leblanc; Anna Mancuso; Yvon Marcoux; Tom Mulcair; François Ouimet; Pierre Paradis; Benoît Pelletier; Normand Poulin; Christos Sirros; André Tranchemontagne; Yvon Vallières; Russell Williams	–	23: Line Beauchamp; Claude Béchard; Lawrence Bergman; Yvan Bordeleau; André Bourbeau; Bernard Brodeur; André Chenail; Roch Cholette; Russell Copeman; William Cusano; Margaret Delisle; Michel Després; Jacques Dupuis; Françoise Gauthier; Fatima Houda-Pepin; Réjean Lafrenière; Nicole Loiselle; Norman MacMillan; Pierre Marsan; Robert Middlemiss; Nathalie Normandeau; Nathalie Rochefort; Lise Thériault; David Whissell
Action démocratique du Québec	1: Mario Dumont	–	1: François Corriveau
Total (Note: The President of the National Assembly of Quebec, Louise Harel, votes only in case of a tied vote. Additionally, the Joliette, Lac-Saint-Jean and Vimont electoral districts were vacant.)	82	0	39
Total	67.8%	0.0%	32.2%

=== Marriage ===
The Constitution Act, 1867 is universally interpreted as giving provinces jurisdiction over only the solemnization of marriage, while all other aspects, including capacity to marry, are under federal jurisdiction. On this basis, the Parliament of Canada can legislate on the substantive law of marriage, as it did in 2005 with the Civil Marriage Act. Further, Section 15 of the Canadian Charter of Rights and Freedoms, which guarantees equality rights and was interpreted to prohibit discrimination on the basis of sexual orientation in Egan v Canada, was used by various provincial courts to find laws banning same-sex marriage unconstitutional. The Montreal Charter of Rights and Responsibilities (French: Charte montréalaise des droits et responsabilités; Mohawk: Tiohtià꞉ke Aoianerénhsera ne Iakoianerenhserá꞉wis tánon Iakoterihwaíen꞉nis) goes further in explicitling prohibiting discrimination based on sexual orientation: "Human dignity can only be preserved with a sustained and collective fight against poverty and all forms of discrimination, and in particular, those based on ethnic or national origin, race, age, social status, civil status, language, religion, sex, gender identity and expression, sexual orientation or disability." (Note: In some official and indigenous languages of Quebec: French: La dignité de l'être humain ne peut être sauvegardée sans que soient constamment et collectivement combattues la pauvreté ainsi que toutes les formes de discrimination, notamment celles fondées sur l'origine ethnique ou nationale, la couleur, l'âge, la condition sociale, l'état civil, la langue, la religion, le sexe, l'identité et l'expression de genre, l'orientation sexuelle ou le handicap.; Mohawk: Iah thaontókten ne ónkwe akorenhsaronhtshera tókaʼ eniakoioʼten tóhsaʼ aiakoténhton kwah tsik nitiotierá꞉ton tóhsaʼ ahonwatikén꞉ron sénha ne ákteʼ nithoné꞉non, tsi nihatiiaʼtó꞉ten, tsi naʼtehonohseriiá꞉kon, tsi nithonátte, tókaʼ ken rotiniá꞉kon, tsi nikawennó꞉ten rontá꞉ti, tsi nihotirihwiiostonhtsheró꞉ten, ónhkaʼ ne ronnónha (eʼksá꞉ʼa raksá꞉ʼa), tsi ní꞉ioht tsi ierákwas akénhake iakón꞉kwe taní rón꞉kwe, khóni ne iah akwah teiakotaʼkarí꞉te.)

In November 2004, the National Assembly enacted An Act to amend the Civil Code as regards marriage (French: Loi modifiant le Code civil relativement au mariage), amending the Civil Code of Quebec to replace references to "husband and wife" with the gender-neutral term "spouses" and permit civil unions to be converted to marriages. Quebec was the first province in Canada to bring its laws in line with the legalisation of same-sex marriage and add a gender-neutral definition of spouse in its marriage laws.

== First Nations ==
While the Indian Act (French: Loi sur les Indiens; Cree: ᐄᔨᔨᐤ ᐎᔨᔓᐙᐎᓐ, Iiyiyiu Wiyishuwaawin; Inuktitut: ᓄᓇᖃᖅᑳᖅᓯᒪᔪᑦ ᐱᖁᔭᖅ, Nunaqaqqaaqsimajut Piqujaq; Innu: Innu Tshishe-utshimau-mashinaikan; Algonquin: Anishinabe Tibakonagewin; Naskapi: ᐃᔪᐤ ᐎᓱᐛᐅᓐ, Iiyuw Wiisuwaaun) governs many aspects of life for First Nations in Canada, it does not directly govern marriage or provide a framework for conducting customary marriages. Instead, marriage laws are primarily governed by provincial and territorial legislation. However, the Indian Act has some indirect impacts on marriage, particularly regarding band membership and property rights on reserves. Traditional Indigenous law does not address same-sex unions. For instance, the Great Law of Peace (Mohawk: Kaianereʼkó꞉wa) is silent on the issue, only stating that members of the same clan are forbidden to marry.

While there are no records of same-sex marriages being performed in First Nations cultures in the way they are commonly defined in Western legal systems, many Indigenous communities recognize identities and relationships that may be placed on the LGBT spectrum. Among these are two-spirit individuals—people who embody both masculine and feminine qualities. In some cultures, two-spirit individuals assigned male at birth wear women's clothing and engage in household and artistic work associated with the feminine sphere. Historically, this identity sometimes allowed for unions between two people of the same biological sex. The Cree refer to two-spirit individuals as iskwaauhuu (ᐃᔅᐧᑳᐅᐦᐆ). They are regarded as "esteemed persons with special spiritual powers" and are "noted shamans", and it is likely that they could marry cisgender men. Other nations also have distinct terms and respected roles for two-spirit people. The Mohawk refer to them as onón꞉wat (pronounced [oˈnũ̌ːwat]), meaning "I have the pattern of two spirits inside my body."

== Marriage and civil union statistics ==
From 2004 to 2025, 11,946 same-sex marriages were performed in Quebec, representing about 2.5% of all marriages contracted during that time. There were also 1,301 same-sex civil unions performed between 2002 and 2025, representing about 26% of all civil unions.

Between 2004 and 2008, 17% of same-sex marriages were between couples from other provinces or territories, or from the United States. The following table shows the number of marriages and civil unions performed in Quebec as per data published by the Institut de la statistique du Québec. Figures for 2020 and 2021 are lower than previous years because of the restrictions in place due to the COVID-19 pandemic.

Number of marriages and civil unions performed in Quebec
Year	Same-sex marriages			Total marriages	% same-sex	Same-sex civil unions			Total unions	% same-sex
Year	Female	Male	Total	Total marriages	% same-sex	Female	Male	Total	Total unions	% same-sex
2002	–	–	–	–	–	69	87	156	166	94.0%
2003	–	–	–	–	–	134	140	274	342	80.1%
2004	97	148	245	21,279	1.15%	31	48	79	179	44.1%
2005	173	278	451	22,244	2.03%	24	35	59	172	34.3%
2006	272	349	621	21,956	2.83%	19	34	53	216	24.5%
2007	216	251	467	22,147	2.11%	17	26	43	241	17.8%
2008	186	262	448	22,053	2.03%	25	44	69	270	25.6%
2009	222	291	513	22,588	2.27%	26	28	54	239	22.6%
2010	234	281	515	23,199	2.22%	19	36	55	280	19.6%
2011	256	237	493	22,903	2.15%	27	32	59	240	24.6%
2012	259	255	514	23,504	2.19%	26	33	59	288	20.5%
2013	306	286	592	23,181	2.55%	23	27	50	290	17.2%
2014	291	286	577	22,429	2.57%	20	17	37	240	15.4%
2015	285	315	600	22,441	2.67%	15	22	37	228	16.2%
2016	317	343	660	21,958	3.01%	13	13	26	223	11.7%
2017	336	343	679	22,883	2.97%	17	22	39	219	17.8%
2018	385	323	708	22,841	3.10%	18	17	35	237	14.8%
2019	365	317	682	22,284	3.06%	13	20	33	207	16.4%
2020	192	206	398	11,326	3.51%	7	12	19	119	16.0%
2021	245	245	490	14,708	3.33%	5	8	13	117	11.1%
2022	371	331	704	22,908	3.07%	8	11	19	122	15.6%
2023	377	351	728	22,711	3.21%	6	8	14	108	13.0%
2024	382	362	744	23,066	3.23%	3	7	10	105	9.52%
2025	426	351	777	22,711	3.42%	4	5	9	83	10.8%

== Religious performance ==
Several dioceses of the Anglican Church of Canada allow their clergy to bless and perform same-sex marriages. In 2008, the synod of the Diocese of Montreal voted to allow its parishes to bless same-sex unions. The measure includes a freedom of conscience clause for clergy opposed to blessing same-sex unions. In July 2016, Bishop Mary Irwin-Gibson said she would allow clergy in the Diocese of Montreal to perform same-sex marriages. The Diocese of Ottawa, which encompasses parts of western Quebec, including the Outaouais region, has also allowed clergy to solemnise same-sex marriages since 2016. The Diocese of Quebec has allowed blessings of same-sex unions since 2012. Bishop Bruce Myers expressed disappointment in July 2019 when the Anglican Church of Canada narrowly rejected a motion to approve same-sex marriage. On 24 November 2019, the synod of the Diocese of Quebec voted 37–6 to request that Bishop Myers authorise the solemnisation of same-sex marriages. In response to the request, Myers said, "You'll here more from me, because… what this motion also expects is that I will come back to the diocese with some specifics around how such a request would be implemented, and being clear about things like safeguards for those who do not wish to exercise and offer this ministry." On the other hand, same-sex marriages are not performed in the Diocese of Moosonee, which encompasses the northwestern Eeyou Istchee communities. The marriage canon of the Anglican Church of Canada serves as the canon on marriage in the diocese. Similarly, the Diocese of The Arctic, encompassing the northern Nunavik region, does not allow its parishes to perform same-sex marriages.

Some other religious organisations also perform same-sex marriages in their places of worship, including the United Church of Canada, Quakers, the Evangelical Lutheran Church in Canada, and the Canadian Unitarian Council.

== Public opinion ==
A 2017 CROP poll showed that Quebec had the highest popular support for same-sex marriage in Canada, at 80%. Nationwide, 74% of Canadians found it "great that in Canada, two people of the same sex can get married", while 26% disagreed.

== See also ==
- Same-sex marriage in Canada
- LGBT rights in Canada
