= Adult interdependent relationship in Alberta =

Type of recognized partnership in province of Canada

Since 2003, adult interdependent relationships have been available to both same-sex and opposite-sex couples in the Canadian province of Alberta, imposing some but not all of the obligations of marriage and providing some but not all the rights and benefits thereof.

According to the Alberta Ministry of Agriculture, Food, and Rural Development, "adult interdependent partner is the new name in Alberta for a common-law spouse. However, the term encompasses more than heterosexual common-law relationships. It includes same-sex relationships, as well as two non-conjugal persons who live together in a relationship of interdependence. In some circumstances it could even include two members of the same family, or two friends who live together."

According to the Alberta Ministry of Justice, "The act covers a range of personal relationships that fall outside of marriage, including committed platonic relationships where two people agree to share emotional and economic responsibilities." Under the terms of the law, couples in a mutually dependent relationship, conjugal or not, are deemed to be adult interdependent partners after three years of living together, even without signing a partnership agreement.

== Legislative history ==
In 1999, the Supreme Court of Canada issued its landmark ruling in the case of M. v. H., which essentially required all provinces to extend the benefits of common-law marriage to same-sex couples, under the equality provisions of Section Fifteen of the Canadian Charter of Rights and Freedoms. Owing to the conservative political climate in the province, the government of Alberta was slow to respond, but in 2000 Alberta did amend the provincial Marriage Act to specifically limit marriage to different-sex couples.

In January 2002, the Alberta Law Reform Institute, funded in part by the provincial government, published its recommendations in a report, Recognition of Rights and Obligations in Same-Sex Relationships. Subsequently, Bill 30, establishing adult interdependent relationships, was introduced in the Legislative Assembly of Alberta in the spring session of 2002 but was not passed at that time. In the fall session, the bill was re-introduced as 30-2 and was passed with amendments as the Adult Interdependent Relationships Act (S.A. 2002, c. A-4.5) on December 4, 2002. The act was proclaimed in force on June 1, 2003.

The act did not amend the Marriage Act, but did amend 69 other Alberta laws, including:

- Alberta Evidence Act
- Assured Income for the Severely Handicapped Act
- Change of Name Act
- Dependent Adults Act
- Domestic Relations Act
- Employment Pensions Plan Act
- Family Relief Act
- Human Tissue Gift Act
- Intestate Succession Act
- Maintenance Enforcement Act
- Mental Health Act
- Matrimonial Property Act
- Metis Settlement Acts
- Municipal Government Act
- Protection Against Family Violence Act
- Protection for Persons in Care Act
- Personal Directives Act
- Power of Attorney Act
- Wills Act

However, provincial laws on personal income tax and employer pensions are required to follow the federal definition of "common-law partner," i.e., someone who has been in a conjugal relationship with the taxpayer for at least one year, or is the parent of a child of the taxpayer. Thus, these laws do not apply to those adult interdependent partners who do not meet the federal criteria.

== Judicial history ==
In the leading case, Medora v. Kohn (2003 ABQB 700), the first persons to be defined by the Alberta courts as "Adult Interdependent Partners" were Kimberley Anne Medora and Lenard George Kohn.

== Definition and eligibility ==
According to the Alberta Ministry of Justice, there are "two key elements" that define an adult interdependent relationship.

First, the two parties must:

- share one another's lives,
- be emotionally committed to one another, and
- function as an economic and domestic unit.
- not be in an ongoing marriage to another person at the same time.

A relationship where one party pays the other to provide care does not qualify as an adult interdependent relationship.

Second, the partners must be:

- living in an interdependent relationship for a minimum of three years,
- living in an interdependent relationship of some permanence where there is a child by birth or adoption, or
- living in or intend to live in an interdependent relationship and have entered into a written adult interdependent partnership agreement.

Persons 16 years and older may declare themselves adult interdependent partners, although those who are under 18 must also have their parents sign the agreement.

Persons related by blood or adoption must be over 18 and must enter into a written partnership agreement to become adult interdependent partners.

== Adult interdependent partnership agreement ==
An adult interdependent partnership agreement is a personal agreement between the two partners. It must follow the form prescribed in Alberta law, and be signed by both parties and by two witnesses. There is no central registry for such agreements.

== Obligations, rights and benefits ==
According to the Alberta Ministry of Justice, an adult interdependent relationship may result in the imposition of obligations and may affect eligibility for benefits under a variety of Alberta programs and laws, such as the following:

- partners are obligated to financially support one another.
- partners and their dependants will be able to register together for coverage under the Alberta Health Care Insurance Plan. Both partners' incomes will be considered when determining eligibility for premium assistance under the plan.
- partners will be eligible for insurance coverage (e.g. life, auto, property) currently available to spouses.
- a deceased partner's estate will be obligated to adequately provide for the surviving partner.
- a partner may access all or a portion of a deceased partner's estate should the partner die without a will.
- partners will have the ability to recover damages for the wrongful death of a partner.
- a partner may apply for a protection order if an adult interdependent partner has subjected them to violence or threat of violence.
- a public body may disclose personal information to the adult interdependent partner of an injured, ill or deceased individual, or so that the person's adult interdependent partner may be contacted.
- various conflict of interest provisions extended to married couples will also apply to adult interdependent partners.

The provisions of the Adult Interdependent Relationships Act can have surprising consequences for families who are unaware of its provisions. According to the Alberta Ministry of Agriculture, Food, and Rural Development, "If a person dies leaving a spouse and an adult interdependent partner, then under the Intestate Succession Act, the person who last lived with the deceased will take the spousal share. For example, if the adult interdependent partner last lived with the deceased, then the adult interdependent partner will take the first $40,000 plus one third. The spouse will take nothing, but is entitled to apply to the court for a share of the estate under the Dependants Relief Act. The court will then have to divide the estate between the spouse, adult interdependent partner and dependent children."

Furthermore, "Non-conjugal friends living together in a relationship of interdependence for a continuous period of not less than three years will become adult interdependent partners, whether or not they intend to. While it may be possible to contract out of some of the statutes amended by the Adult Interdependent Relationships Act," it is not possible to contract out of the Dependants Relief Act. Thus, if two elderly friends, same-sex or different-sex, live together in a platonic relationship for several years, when one dies, the other may be able to claim a larger share of the deceased's estate than any surviving children, even if the two friends never signed an adult interdependent partnership agreement.

== Termination ==
According to the Alberta Ministry of Justice, an adult interdependent partnership may be terminated in the following ways:

- The partners may sign a written agreement stating their intention to live separate and apart, without the possibility of reconciliation.
- The partners live separate and apart for more than one year and one or both partners intend that the adult interdependent relationship not continue.
- The partners marry each other or one of them marries or enters into an adult interdependent relationship with a third party.

== See also ==
- LGBT rights in Alberta
- Same-sex marriage in Alberta
