= Pastoral letter =

Open letter from a bishop to his clergy or laity

A pastoral letter, often simply called a pastoral, is an open letter addressed by a bishop to the clergy or laity of a diocese or to both, containing general admonition, instruction or consolation, or directions for behaviour in particular circumstances. In most episcopal church bodies, clerics are often required to read out pastoral letters of superior bishops to their congregations.

In the Catholic Church, such letters are also sent out regularly at particular ecclesiastical seasons, particularly at the beginning of fasts.

In the non-episcopal Protestant churches a pastoral letter is any open letter addressed by a pastor to his congregation, more especially to one customarily issued at certain seasons, for example, by the moderator of a Presbyterian assembly or the chairman of a Congregational or Baptist union.

The Armenian term for pastoral letter is kondak, also translated as encyclical, statement, or decree.
