= Same-sex marriage in Nunavut =

Same-sex marriage has been legal in Nunavut since 20 July 2005, when royal assent was granted to the federal Civil Marriage Act. This law legalised same-sex marriage in all the provinces and territories of Canada. Previously, in October 2003, Premier Paul Okalik had announced that same-sex marriages performed in other jurisdictions would be legally recognized in Nunavut.

== Background ==
On 30 October 2003, Premier Paul Okalik made the following statement on the issue of same-sex marriage:

If developments in the Parliament of Canada and the Supreme Court of Canada result in the definition of marriage being broadened, we will respect the law and comply with that. In the meantime, anyone in Nunavut who has been legally married anywhere will be recognized by the Government of Nunavut as married.

Okalik further suggested that the territory would perform same-sex divorces should the issue arise. He also succeeded in passing a territorial human rights code banning discrimination on the basis of sexual orientation. As well, Nancy Karetak-Lindell, Liberal MP for the riding of Nunavut, was re-elected in the 2006 election after having supported same-sex marriage; a stance for which she faced criticism from some residents of Coral Harbour. In the 2004 general election, Okalik's only opponent for the premiership, Tagak Curley, ran on the basis that he would repeal the territory's human rights legislation on sexual orientation, and would not recognize same-sex marriages. During the same general election, several candidates, including Patterk Netser, Rebekah Williams, and Manitok Thompson, also spoke out against same-sex marriage.

In 2005, a group of Inuit leaders called same-sex marriage "disruptive to traditional values" at a meeting of the Justice Committee of the House of Commons. Chris Trott, an associate professor at the University of Manitoba, said, "the elders are probably correct to say formal gay relationships are an example of southern influence. Practically speaking, liberation for Inuit homosexuals came in the form of the English language. In the encounter with the west, and in speaking English, they have a way of talking about that now. Once people find the vocabulary to articulate what they're feeling, then they say it. And I think that's what's going on now. Young people now have a way of speaking about it." Anglican and Pentecostal religious leaders were adamantly opposed to the legalization of same-sex marriage in Nunavut, often referring to it as "contrary to Inuit culture". A local in Iqaluit who was asked to comment for the Nunatsiaq News said "it's interesting to see religious leaders offering opinions on how Inuit should behave when Christianity itself is a southern import." The House of Commons passed the Civil Marriage Act in June 2005. It passed through the Canadian Senate on July 19 and received royal assent the next day on July 20, 2005, extending same-sex marriage rights across all of Canada.

== Territorial legislation ==
In October 2011, the Legislative Assembly of Nunavut amended the Marriage Act (Inuktitut: ᑲᑎᑎᓯᒪᔪᓕᕆᓂᕐᒧᑦ ᐱᖁᔭᖅ, Katitisimajulirinirmut Piqujaq; Inuinnaqtun: Katitiviliqinikkut Maligaq; French: Loi sur le mariage) and several other acts relating to family law. The bill passed by the Assembly replaced the expression "husband and wife" with the gender-neutral term "spouses", and amended the Adoption Act to allow same-sex couples to adopt children. The bill received royal assent by Commissioner Edna Elias on 31 October 2011.

Section 13 of the Marriage Act reads:

Where a marriage ceremony is performed by a marriage commissioner [...] (b) each of the parties to the marriage shall, in the presence of the marriage commissioner and the witnesses, say to the other party: I call upon these persons here present to witness that I, .................., do take thee, .................., to be my lawful wedded (husband, wife, or spouse). [RSNWT 1998, c M-4, s 13]

== Marriage statistics ==
From July 2005 to October 2006, only one same-sex couple married in Nunavut, the lowest among all of Canada's provinces and territories. The first same-sex marriage involving an Inuk man was performed in June 2017 in Iqaluit between Joe Kucharski and Dwayne Nowdlak. There had already been one marriage for an Inuk lesbian couple. The first same-sex marriage in Cambridge Bay was performed between Jason Koblogina and Kyle Mercer in August 2018.

The 2016 Canadian census showed that were 25 same-sex couples living in Nunavut, though it is unknown how many were married, in a common-law marriage or cohabiting.

== Religious performance ==
In July 2019, the synod of the Anglican Church of Canada narrowly rejected a motion to authorize same-sex marriage and allow clergy in the Church to officiate at such marriages. Instead, the church synod passed a resolution known as "A Word to the Church", allowing its dioceses to choose whether to bless and perform same-sex marriages. Clergy of the Diocese of The Arctic, including Bishop David Parsons, have been vocally opposed to the solemnization of same-sex marriages. Following the passage of the resolution, several dioceses, including those of Ottawa and Rupert's Land, announced they would permit their clergy to solemnize same-sex marriages in accordance with the new resolution passed by the church synod. The Diocese of The Arctic chose to distance itself from these dioceses, but, responding to concerns that it might be leaving the Anglican Church of Canada, it released a statement, "The Diocese of the Arctic remains a diocese within the Anglican Church of Canada, but must distance itself from those who violate the marriage canon. The implication of this is a state of 'impaired communion'."

Some other religious organizations perform same-sex marriages in their places of worship, including the United Church of Canada, Quakers, the Evangelical Lutheran Church in Canada, and the Canadian Unitarian Council.

== See also ==
- LGBT rights in Canada
- Same-sex marriage in Canada
- Sipiniq (ᓯᐱᓂᖅ), person in Inuit culture who is believed to have changed their physical sex as an infant
- Two Soft Things, Two Hard Things, a film exploring the Inuit LGBT community in Nunavut
