= Outline of LGBTQ topics =

LGBTQ means lesbian, gay, bisexual, transgender, and queer

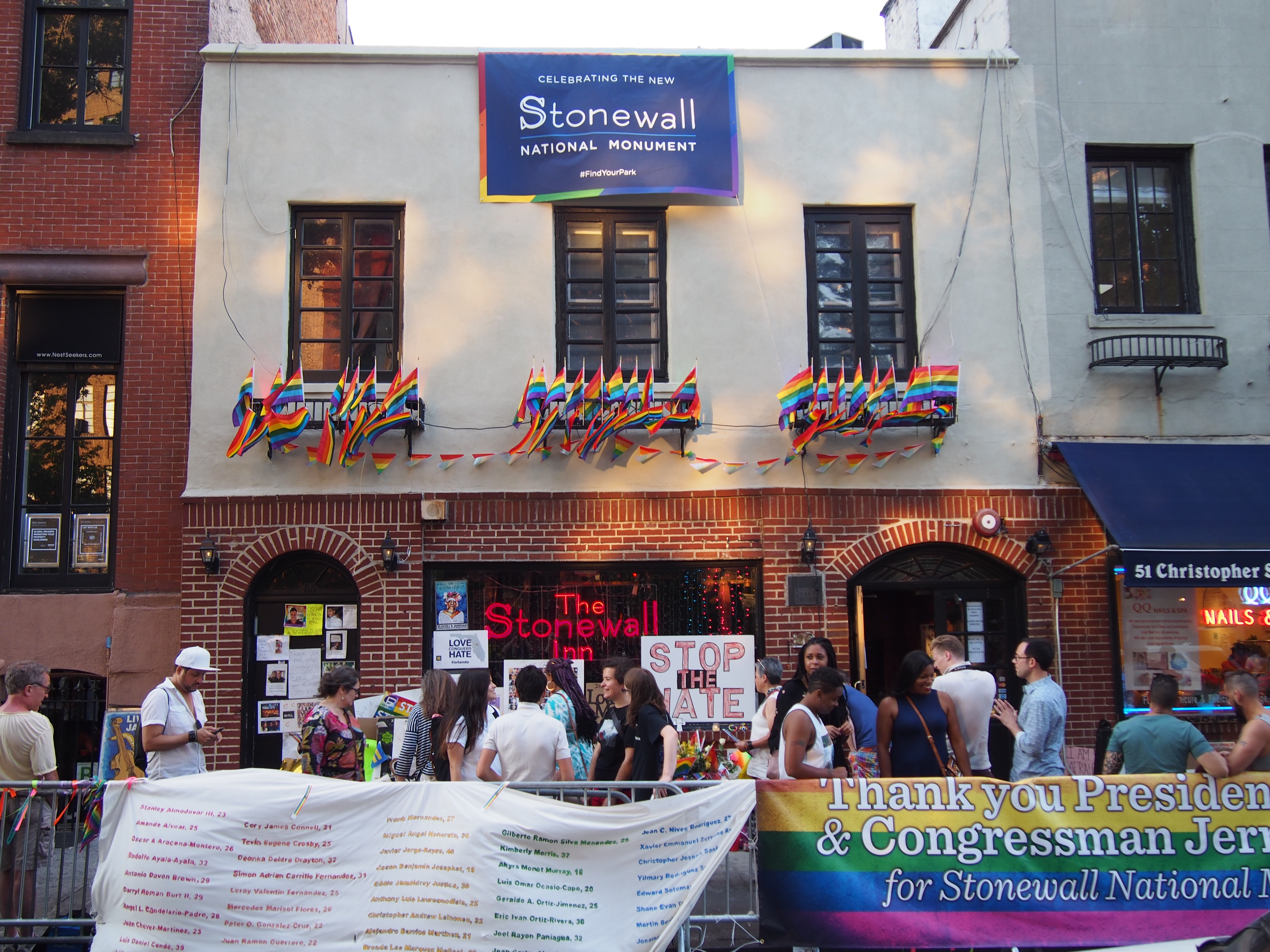
The Stonewall Inn in the gay village of Greenwich Village, Manhattan, site of the June 1969 Stonewall riots, the cradle of the modern LGBTQ rights movement and an icon of LGBTQ culture, is adorned with rainbow pride flags.

The following outline offers an overview and guide to topics about LGBTQ people.

The initialism LGBTQ stands for "lesbian, gay, bisexual, transgender, and queer". It may refer to anyone who is non-heterosexual, non-heteroromantic, and/or non-cisgender, instead of exclusively to people who are lesbian, gay, bisexual, or transgender.

== Sexuality ==
- Human sexuality
  - Sexology
    - Sexology (magazine)
  - Sexual diversity
  - Gendered sexuality
    - Gender variance
    - Human male sexuality
    - Human female sexuality
    - Transgender sexuality
- Sexual attraction
  - Androphilia and gynephilia
  - Attraction to transgender people
  - Achillean
  - Sapphism
  - Split attraction model
- Sexual orientation

=== Sexual orientation types ===
- Monosexuality
  - Homosexuality
- Plurisexuality
  - Bisexuality
    - Pansexuality
- Asexuality
  - Gray asexuality
    - Aceflux
    - Autosexuality
    - Fictosexuality
    - Demisexuality
    - Fraysexuality

=== Topics ===
- Ego-dystonic sexual orientation
- Environment and sexual orientation
- Biology and sexual orientation
  - Neuroscience and sexual orientation
  - Prenatal hormones and sexual orientation
  - Handedness and sexual orientation
  - Epigenetic theories of homosexuality
  - Fraternal birth order and male sexual orientation
- Demographics of sexual orientation
- Timeline of sexual orientation and medicine
- Scales of sexual orientation
- Sexual fluidity
  - Bi-curiosity
  - Heteroflexibility
- Gray asexuality

=== By region ===
- Sexuality in Africa
- Sexuality in Bangladesh
- Sexuality in China
- Sexuality in India
- Sexuality in Japan
- Sexuality in Somalia
- Sexuality in South America
- Sexuality in South Korea
- Sexuality in the Philippines
- Sexuality in the United States

=== By culture ===
- Sexuality in Christian demonology
- Sexuality in Islam
- Sexuality in Star Trek
- Sexuality in The Lord of the Rings
- Sexuality in ancient Rome
- Sexuality in music videos
- Sexuality in older age

== Identities ==
- Queer
- Questioning

=== Sexual identity topics ===
- Sexual orientation identities
  - Non-heterosexual
    - LGBTQ psychology
    - Heteroflexible
    - Homosexual
      - Lesbian
      - Gay
      - Gay men
    - Bisexual
    - Pansexual
    - Bi-curious
    - Asexual
- Romantic orientation
  - Aromantic

=== Gender identity topics ===
- Gender
  - Androgyne
  - Cisgender
  - Intersex
  - Transgender
    - Identitites
      - Trans men
      - Trans women
      - Non-binary
    - History
    - People
    - Rights
      - Discrimination
    - Health care
      - Gender dysphoria
      - Gender-affirming hormone therapy
      - Gender-affirming surgery
      - Legal status
      - Misinformation
- Gender identity
  - Man
  - Woman
  - Non-binary
  - Third gender
    - Androgynos
    - Akava'ine
    - Apwint
    - Bakla
    - Bugis genders
    - Chibados
    - Enaree
    - Eunuch
    - Fa'afafine
    - Fakaleitī
    - Femminiello
    - Galli
    - Güevedoce
    - Hijra
    - Kathoey
    - Khanith
    - Köçek
    - Koekchuch
    - Lhamana
    - Māhū
    - Mak nyah
    - Mukhannathun
    - Muxe
    - Nádleehi
    - Nullo
    - Rae-rae
    - Sipiniq
    - Sworn virgin
    - Takatāpui
    - Travesti
    - Tumtum
    - Two-spirit
    - Winkte
- Transgender inequality
- Transgender rights movement

== Sex and physiology ==
- Male
- Female
- Endosex
- Intersex

== Romance ==
- Cross-sex relationships involving LGBTQ people
- Same-sex relationship
  - LGBTQ romance
  - Boys' love
    - Shōnen Ai no Bigaku
    - Yaoi
      - Yaoi fandom
- Romantic orientation
  - Aromanticism
  - Same gender loving
- Split attraction model

== Expression ==
- Camp
- Coming out
- Passing (gender)
- Cross-dressing
  - Drag (clothing)
    - Drag pageantry
    - Drag king
    - Drag queen
    - Female queen (drag)
  - Transvestism
- Gender roles
  - Manhood
  - Womanhood
  - Gender roles in non-heterosexual communities
- Gender expression
  - Masculinity
  - Femininity
  - Epicenity
  - Androgyny
- Homoeroticism
- Effeminacy
- Butch and femme

== Practices ==
- Men who have sex with men
  - Gay beat
  - Gay bathhouse
- Women who have sex with women
- Sexual practices between men
- Sexual practices between women

== Society ==
- Education and the LGBTQ community
  - LGBTQ student movement
  - LGBTQ student center
  - GLSEN
  - Gay–straight alliance
  - LGBTQ bullying
  - LGBTQ sex education
  - Safe Schools Coalition Australia
  - Gay and Lesbian Teachers and Students Association

=== Homosexuality ===
- Decriminalization of same-sex sexual practices
- Societal attitudes towards homosexuality
- Homosexuality in society
  - Homosexuality in American football
  - Homosexuality in Australian rules football
  - Homosexuality in China
  - Decriminalization of homosexuality in Ecuador
  - Homosexuality in English football
  - Homosexuality in India
  - Homosexuality in Indonesia
  - Homosexuality in Japan
  - Homosexuality in Mexico
  - Homosexuality in Sri Lanka
  - Homosexuality in ancient Egypt
  - Homosexuality in ancient Greece
  - Homosexuality in ancient Rome
  - Homosexuality in association football
  - Homosexuality in college sports
  - Homosexuality in football
  - Homosexuality in medieval Europe
  - Homosexuality in modern sports
  - Homosexuality in pre-Columbian Peru
  - Homosexuality in society
  - Homosexuality in sports in the United States
  - Homosexuality in the Batman franchise
  - Homosexuality in the DSM
  - Homosexuality in the Hebrew Bible
  - Homosexuality in the New Testament
  - Homosexuality in the militaries of ancient Greece

==== Lesbianism ====
- Lesbians in Francoist Spain
- Lesbianism in Gibraltar
- Lesbians in Nazi Germany
- Lesbians in pre-modern Spain
- Lesbians in the Spanish Second Republic
- Lesbians in the Spanish democratic transition period
- Lesbianism in Sri Lanka

=== Adoption, parenting, and same-sex marriage ===
- Same-sex adoption
- Same-sex parenting
  - LGBTQ adoption and parenting in Australia
  - LGBTQ parenting in Canada
  - Same-sex adoption in Brazil
  - Same-sex adoption in Europe
  - Same-sex adoption in the United Kingdom
  - Same-sex adoption in the United States
- Same-sex marriage
  - Same-sex marriage and Judaism
  - Same-sex marriage and the family

=== Same-sex marriage (SSM) by region ===
- Same-sex marriage in Andorra
- Same-sex marriage in Argentina
- Same-sex marriage in Aruba, Curaçao and Sint Maarten
- Same-sex marriage in Australia
- Same-sex marriage in Austria
  - Same-sex marriage in the Australian Capital Territory
- Same-sex marriage in Belgium
- Same-sex marriage in Brazil
  - Same-sex marriage in Alagoas
  - Same-sex marriage in Santa Catarina
- Same-sex marriage in Chile
- Same-sex marriage in Colombia
- Same-sex marriage in Costa Rica
- Same-sex marriage in Cuba
- Same-sex marriage in Denmark
  - Same-sex marriage in the Faroe Islands
- Same-sex marriage in Ecuador
- Same-sex marriage in Estonia
- Same-sex marriage in Finland
- Same-sex marriage in France
- Same-sex marriage in Georgia
- Same-sex marriage in Germany
- Same-sex marriage in Greece
- Same-sex marriage in Greenland
- Same-sex marriage in Iceland
- Same-sex marriage in Liechtenstein
- Same-sex marriage in Luxembourg
- Same-sex marriage in Malta
- Same-sex marriage in Nepal
- Same-sex marriage in New Zealand
- Same-sex marriage in Norway
- Same-sex marriage in Portugal
- Same-sex marriage in Slovenia
- Same-sex marriage in South Africa
- Same-sex marriage in Spain
- Same-sex marriage in Sweden
- Same-sex marriage in Switzerland
- Same-sex marriage in Taiwan
- Same-sex marriage in Thailand
- Same-sex marriage in Uruguay
- Same-sex marriage in the Netherlands
  - Same-sex marriage in Bonaire, Sint Eustatius and Saba
- Same-sex marriage in the Republic of Ireland

==== SSM in Canada ====
- Same-sex marriage in Canada
  - Same-sex marriage in Alberta
  - Same-sex marriage in British Columbia
  - Same-sex marriage in Manitoba
  - Same-sex marriage in New Brunswick
  - Same-sex marriage in Newfoundland and Labrador
  - Same-sex marriage in the Northwest Territories
  - Same-sex marriage in Nova Scotia
  - Same-sex marriage in Nunavut
  - Same-sex marriage in Ontario
  - Same-sex marriage in Prince Edward Island
  - Same-sex marriage in Quebec
  - Same-sex marriage in Saskatchewan
  - Same-sex marriage in Yukon

==== SSM in Mexico ====
- Same-sex marriage in Mexico
  - Same-sex marriage in Aguascalientes
  - Same-sex marriage in Baja California
  - Same-sex marriage in Baja California Sur
  - Same-sex marriage in Campeche
  - Same-sex marriage in Coahuila
  - Same-sex marriage in Colima
  - Same-sex marriage in Chiapas
  - Same-sex marriage in Chihuahua
  - Same-sex marriage in Durango
  - Same-sex marriage in Guerrero
  - Same-sex marriage in Guanajuato
  - Same-sex marriage in Hidalgo
  - Same-sex marriage in Jalisco
  - Same-sex marriage in the State of Mexico
  - Same-sex marriage in Mexico City
  - Same-sex marriage in Michoacán
  - Same-sex marriage in Morelos
  - Same-sex marriage in Nayarit
  - Same-sex marriage in Nuevo León
  - Same-sex marriage in Oaxaca
  - Same-sex marriage in Puebla
  - Same-sex marriage in Querétaro
  - Same-sex marriage in Quintana Roo
  - Same-sex marriage in San Luis Potosí
  - Same-sex marriage in Sinaloa
  - Same-sex marriage in Sonora
  - Same-sex marriage in Tamaulipas
  - Same-sex marriage in Tabasco
  - Same-sex marriage in Tlaxcala
  - Same-sex marriage in Veracruz
  - Same-sex marriage in Yucatán
  - Same-sex marriage in Zacatecas

==== SSM in the UK ====
- Same-sex marriage in the United Kingdom
  - Same-sex marriage in Akrotiri and Dhekelia
  - Same-sex marriage in Bermuda
  - Same-sex marriage in the Cayman Islands
  - Same-sex marriage in Guernsey
  - Same-sex marriage in Gibraltar
  - Same-sex marriage in Jersey
  - Same-sex marriage in Northern Ireland
  - Same-sex marriage in Scotland
  - Same-sex marriage in the Isle of Man
  - Same-sex marriage in the Falkland Islands
  - Same-sex marriage in the Pitcairn Islands
  - Same-sex marriage in the British Antarctic Territory
  - Same-sex marriage in the British Indian Ocean Territory
  - Same-sex marriage in South Georgia and the South Sandwich Islands
  - Same-sex marriage in Saint Helena, Ascension and Tristan da Cunha

==== SSM in the US ====
- Same-sex marriage in the United States
  - Same-sex unions in the United States
  - Same-sex marriage in tribal nations in the United States
  - Same-sex marriage law in the United States by state
    - Same-sex marriage in Alabama
    - Same-sex marriage in Alaska
    - Same-sex marriage in Arizona
    - Same-sex marriage in Arkansas
    - Same-sex marriage in California
    - Same-sex marriage in Colorado
    - Same-sex marriage in Connecticut
    - Same-sex marriage in Delaware
    - Same-sex marriage in Florida
    - Same-sex marriage in Georgia (U.S. state)
    - Same-sex marriage in Hawaii
    - Same-sex marriage in Idaho
    - Same-sex marriage in Illinois
    - Same-sex marriage in Indiana
    - Same-sex marriage in Iowa
    - Same-sex marriage in Kansas
    - Same-sex marriage in Kentucky
    - Same-sex marriage in Louisiana
    - Same-sex marriage in Maine
    - Same-sex marriage in Maryland
    - Same-sex marriage in Massachusetts
    - Same-sex marriage in Michigan
    - Same-sex marriage in Minnesota
    - Same-sex marriage in Mississippi
    - Same-sex marriage in Missouri
    - Same-sex marriage in Montana
    - Same-sex marriage in Nebraska
    - Same-sex marriage in Nevada
    - Same-sex marriage in New Hampshire
    - Same-sex marriage in New Jersey
    - Same-sex marriage in New Mexico
    - Same-sex marriage in New York
    - Same-sex marriage in North Carolina
    - Same-sex marriage in North Dakota
    - Same-sex marriage in Ohio
    - Same-sex marriage in Oklahoma
    - Same-sex marriage in Oregon
    - Same-sex marriage in Pennsylvania
    - Same-sex marriage in Rhode Island
    - Same-sex marriage in South Carolina
    - Same-sex marriage in South Dakota
    - Same-sex marriage in Tennessee
    - Same-sex marriage in Texas
    - Same-sex marriage in Utah
    - Same-sex marriage in Vermont
    - Same-sex marriage in Virginia
    - Same-sex marriage in Washington (state)
    - Same-sex marriage in West Virginia
    - Same-sex marriage in Wisconsin
    - Same-sex marriage in Wyoming
    - Same-sex marriage in the District of Columbia
  - Same-sex marriage law in the United States by territory
    - Same-sex marriage in American Samoa
    - Same-sex marriage in Guam
    - Same-sex marriage in the Northern Mariana Islands
    - Same-sex marriage in Puerto Rico
    - Same-sex marriage in the United States Virgin Islands
  - Same-sex marriage legislation in the United States

=== Same-sex partnerships, and immigration ===
- Civil union
  - Unregistered cohabitation in Israel
  - Civil union in New Zealand
  - De facto union in Portugal
  - Civil unions in Quebec
  - Civil partnership in South Africa
  - Civil partnership in the United Kingdom
- Same-sex immigration policy in Brazil
- Same-sex immigration policy of the United States

=== People topics ===
- LGBTQ people in Australia
- LGBTQ people in Brazil
- LGBTQ people in Canada
- LGBTQ topics in Chile
- LGBTQ people in Colombia
- LGBTQ in Guatemala
- LGBTQ people in Mexico
- LGBTQ people in New Zealand
- LGBTQ in Puerto Rico
- LGBTQ people in prison
- LGBTQ people in the Russo-Ukrainian War
- LGBTQ people in science
- LGBTQ topics in the United States
  - LGBTQ people in the United States

=== Themes ===
- LGBTQ themes in African diasporic mythologies
- LGBTQ themes in American mainstream comics
- LGBTQ themes in anime and manga
- LGBTQ themes in Chinese mythology
- LGBTQ themes in Hindu mythology
- LGBTQ themes in horror fiction
- LGBTQ themes in comics
- LGBTQ themes in mythology
- LGBTQ themes in speculative fiction
- LGBTQ themes in video games
- LGBTQ themes in Western animation

== Language ==
- Gay male speech
- Gayle language
- IsiNgqumo
- LGBTQ acronyms
- LGBTQ linguistics
- LGBTQ linguistic profiling
- LGBTQ slang
  - Down-low (sexual slang)
- Polari
- Swardspeak
- Terminology of homosexuality

== Culture ==
- LGBTQ culture
- Queer art
  - LGBTQ art in Singapore
  - List of LGBTQ art exhibitions in Britain
- List of LGBTQ-related films
  - LGBTQ cinema in Latin America
- LGBTQ community
  - African-American LGBTQ community
  - Bi community
  - Trans community
- LGBTQ movements
  - Homophile Movement
  - Gay liberation movement
  - Lesbian feminism
  - LGBTQ movements in the United States
- LGBTQ symbols
  - Pride flag
- Gay bar
- Lesbian bar
- Gay Games
- Gay icons
- Gay pride
  - Black gay pride
  - WorldPride
- LGBTQ pride events in Singapore
- Gay village
- Gaydar
- Queer art
- LGBTQ music
- LGBTQ slogans
- Queer nationalism
- Pinkwashing (LGBTQ)

=== By country ===
- LGBTQ culture in Argentina
- LGBTQ culture in Hong Kong
- LGBTQ culture in India
- LGBTQ culture in Ireland
- LGBTQ culture in Japan
- LGBTQ culture in Mexico
- LGBTQ culture in Russia
- LGBTQ culture in Singapore
- LGBTQ culture in the Philippines

=== By city ===
- LGBTQ culture in Bangalore
- LGBTQ culture in Beijing
- LGBTQ culture in Berlin
- LGBTQ culture in Brighton and Hove
- LGBTQ culture in Cardiff
- LGBTQ culture in Chengdu
- LGBTQ culture in Chennai
- LGBTQ culture in Hyderabad
- LGBTQ culture in Istanbul
- LGBTQ culture in Leeds
- LGBTQ culture in Liverpool
- LGBTQ culture in London
- LGBTQ culture in Paris
- LGBTQ culture in Prague
- LGBTQ culture in Puerto Vallarta
- LGBTQ culture in Shanghai
- LGBTQ culture in Sydney
- LGBTQ culture in Tokyo
- LGBTQ culture in Vancouver
- LGBTQ culture in Vienna

==== By US region ====
- LGBTQ culture in Austin, Texas
- LGBTQ culture in Boston
- LGBTQ culture in Baltimore
- LGBTQ culture in Chicago
- LGBTQ culture in Dallas–Fort Worth
- LGBTQ culture in Eugene, Oregon
- LGBTQ culture in Houston
- LGBTQ culture in Los Angeles
- LGBTQ culture in Metro Detroit
- LGBTQ culture in Miami
- LGBTQ culture in Nashville
- LGBTQ culture in New York City
- LGBTQ culture in Philadelphia
- LGBTQ culture in Portland, Oregon
- LGBTQ culture in San Antonio
- LGBTQ culture in San Francisco
- LGBTQ culture in Seattle
- LGBTQ culture in St. Louis
- LGBTQ culture in Washington, D.C.
- Queer culture in the Southern United States

=== LGBTQ media ===
- LGBTQ media

==== Print ====
- The Gay News-Telegraph
- Gay News
- Queer Zine Archive Project
- Shōnen Ai no Bigaku

==== Moving image ====
- Gay News and Views
- New Queer Cinema
- Gay pornography
- Lesbian erotica
- Bisexual pornography
- Transgender pornography
- Queer pornography
- GayVN Awards
- Media portrayal of LGBTQ people
  - LGBTQ representation in children's television
  - LGBTQ representation in hip hop music
  - LGBTQ representation in South Korean film and television
  - LGBTQ representation in The Simpsons
  - Intersex representation in film
  - Intersex representation in television

== History ==
- LGBTQ history
  - First homosexual movement
  - Gay Liberation
  - History of male homosexuality
  - History of lesbianism
  - History of same-sex unions
  - History of bisexuality
  - Stonewall riots
  - Transgender history
  - Timeline of asexual history

=== By country ===
- LGBTQ history in Australia
- LGBTQ history in Argentina
- LGBTQ history in Bangladesh
- LGBTQ history in Belgium
- LGBTQ history in Brazil
- LGBTQ history in Canada
- LGBTQ history in Chile
- LGBTQ history in China
- LGBTQ history in the Czech Republic
- LGBTQ people in the Dominican Republic
- LGBTQ history in Finland
- LGBTQ history in France
- LGBTQ history in Georgia
- LGBTQ history in Greece
- LGBTQ history in Honduras
- LGBTQ history in Hungary
- LGBTQ history in India
- LGBTQ history in Iran
- LGBTQ history in Ireland
- LGBTQ history in Italy
- LGBTQ history in Israel
- LGBTQ history in Kenya
- LGBTQ history in Latvia
- LGBTQ history in Mexico
- LGBTQ history in Nauru
- LGBTQ history in the Netherlands
- LGBTQ history in North Dakota
- LGBTQ history in Norway
- LGBTQ history in Pakistan
- LGBTQ history in Peru
- LGBTQ history in Poland
- LGBTQ history in Portugal
- LGBTQ history in Romania
- LGBTQ history in Russia
- LGBTQ history in Serbia
- LGBTQ history in Singapore
- LGBTQ history in South Korea
- LGBTQ history in Spain
- LGBTQ history in Sudan
- LGBTQ history in Sweden
- LGBTQ history in Switzerland
- LGBTQ history in Taiwan
- LGBTQ history in Thailand
- LGBTQ history in Turkey
- LGBTQ history in Uganda
- LGBTQ history in Yugoslavia
- LGBTQ history in the Soviet Union

==== In the US ====
- LGBTQ history in the United States
  - LGBTQ historic places in the United States
  - Lesbian American history
  - Gay men in American history
  - Bisexual American history
  - Transgender American history
  - LGBTQ history in Atlantic City, New Jersey
  - LGBTQ history in California
  - LGBTQ history in Chinatown, San Francisco
  - LGBTQ history in Connecticut
  - LGBTQ history in Florida
  - LGBTQ history in Georgia (U.S. state)
  - LGBTQ history in Hawaii
  - LGBTQ history in Illinois
  - LGBTQ history in Louisiana
  - LGBTQ history in Massachusetts
  - LGBTQ history in Michigan
  - LGBTQ history in New York
  - LGBTQ history in Rhode Island
  - LGBTQ history in South Dakota
  - LGBTQ history in Texas
  - LGBTQ history in Vermont

=== Timelines ===
- Timeline of LGBTQ history, 20th century
- Timeline of LGBTQ history, 21st century
- Timeline of African and diasporic LGBTQ history
- Timeline of Asian and Pacific Islander diasporic LGBTQ history
- Timeline of LGBTQ history in Canada
- Timeline of LGBTQ history in Ecuador
- Timeline of LGBTQ history in Germany
- Timeline of LGBTQ history in South Africa
- Timeline of South Asian and diasporic LGBTQ history
- Timeline of LGBTQ history in the United Kingdom
  - Timeline of LGBTQ history in Manchester
- Timeline of LGBTQ history in the United States
  - Timeline of LGBTQ history in New York City
- Timeline of LGBTQ journalism
- Timeline of LGBTQ Jewish history
- Timeline of LGBTQ Mormon history
- Timeline of transgender history
- Timeline of intersex history
- Timeline of asexual history
- Timeline of sexual orientation and medicine

== Religion ==
- Queer theology
- Religion and LGBTQ people
  - Islam and LGBTQ people
  - Hinduism and LGBTQ people
  - Modern paganism and LGBTQ people
  - Unitarian Universalism and LGBTQ people
  - Pope Francis and LGBTQ people
- Religion and homosexuality
  - Christianity and homosexuality
    - The Bible and homosexuality
    - Baptist churches and homosexuality
    - Catholicism and homosexuality
    - LDS Church and homosexuality
    - Lutheranism and homosexuality
    - Methodism and homosexuality
    - Pentecostalism and homosexuality
    - Presbyterianism and homosexuality
    - Quakerism and homosexuality
    - Seventh-day Adventism and homosexuality
  - Taoism and homosexuality
  - Baháʼí Faith and homosexuality
  - Buddhism and homosexuality
  - Hare Krishna movement and homosexuality
  - Haitian Vodou and homosexuality
  - Judaism and homosexuality
    - Conservative Judaism and homosexuality
  - Sikhism and homosexuality
  - Scientology and homosexuality
  - Zoroastrianism and homosexuality
- Religion and transgender people
  - LDS Church and transgender people
- Religion and intersex people
- Mythology and LGBTQ themes
  - Hindu mythology and LGBTQ themes
  - African diasporic mythologies and LGBTQ themes
  - Classical European mythology and LGBTQ themes
  - Chinese mythology and LGBTQ themes

== Rights ==
- UN declaration on sexual orientation and gender identity
- Yogyakarta Principles
- Declaration of Montreal
- Freedom of expression
- LGBTQ rights at the United Nations
- Gender self-identification
- Legal status of transgender people
  - Legal recognition of non-binary gender
- Intersex human rights
  - Intersex Human Rights Australia
  - Legal recognition of intersex people
- Right to personal identity
- Sexual and reproductive health and rights

=== By major region ===
- LGBTQ rights by country or territory
  - LGBTQ rights in Africa
  - LGBTQ rights in the Americas
  - LGBTQ rights in Antarctica
  - LGBTQ rights in Asia
  - LGBTQ rights in Europe
  - LGBTQ rights in Oceania

=== By area ===
- Abkhazia
- Aceh
- Acre
- Afghanistan
- Akita Prefecture
- Akrotiri and Dhekelia
- Alabama
- Alagoas
- Alaska
- Albania
- Algeria
- Amazonas
- Amapá
- American Samoa
- Andorra
- Angola
- Anguilla
- Antigua and Barbuda
- Argentina
- Arizona
- Arkansas
- Armenia
- Aruba
- Australia
- Austria
- Azerbaijan
- Bahia
- Bahrain
- Bangladesh
- Barbados
- Belarus
- Belgium
- Belize
- Benin
- Bermuda
- Bhutan
- Bolivia
- Bonaire
- Bosnia and Herzegovina
- Botswana
- Brazil
- Brunei
- Bulgaria
- Burkina Faso
- Burundi
- California
- Cambodia
- Cameroon
- Canada
- Cape Verde
- Ceará
- Chad
- Chechnya
- Chile
- China
- Colombia
- Colorado
- Connecticut
- Costa Rica
- Croatia
- Cuba
- Curaçao
- Cyprus
- Delaware
- Denmark
- Djibouti
- Dominica
- Ecuador
- Egypt
- El Salvador
- Equatorial Guinea
- Eritrea
- Espírito Santo
- Estonia
- Eswatini
- Ethiopia
- Fiji
- Finland
- Florida
- France
- Gabon
- Georgia (country)
- Georgia (U.S. state)
- Germany
- Ghana
- Gibraltar
- Goiás
- Greece
- Greenland
- Grenada
- Guam
- Guatemala
- Guernsey
- Guinea
- Guinea-Bissau
- Guyana
- Haiti
- Hawaii
- Honduras
- Hong Kong
- Hungary
- Ibaraki Prefecture
- Iceland
- Idaho
- Illinois
- India
- Indiana
- Indonesia
- Iowa
- Iran
- Iraq
- Israel
- Italy
- Jamaica
- Japan
- Jersey
- Jordan
- Kansas
- Kazakhstan
- Kentucky
- Kenya
- Kerala
- Kiribati
- Kosovo
- Kurdistan
- Kuwait
- Kyrgyzstan
- La Francophonie
- Laos
- Latvia
- Lebanon
- Lesotho
- Liberia
- Libya
- Liechtenstein
- Lithuania
- Louisiana
- Luxembourg
- Macau
- Madagascar
- Maine
- Malawi
- Malaysia
- Mali
- Malta
- Maranhão
- Maryland
- Massachusetts
- Mato Grosso
- Mato Grosso do Sul
- Mauritania
- Mauritius
- Mexico
- Mexico City
- Michigan
- Minnesota
- Minas Gerais
- Mississippi
- Missouri
- Moldova
- Monaco
- Mongolia
- Montana
- Montenegro
- Montserrat
- Morocco
- Mozambique
- Myanmar
- Namibia
- Nauru
- Nebraska
- Nepal
- Nevada
- New Hampshire
- New Jersey
- New Mexico
- New South Wales
- New York
- New Zealand
- Nicaragua
- Niger
- Nigeria
- Niue
- North Carolina
- North Dakota
- North Korea
- North Macedonia
- Northern Cyprus
- Northern Ireland
- Northern Nigeria
- Norway
- Ohio
- Oklahoma
- Oman
- Oregon
- Pakistan
- Palau
- Panama
- Papua New Guinea
- Paraguay
- Paraná
- Pará
- Pennsylvania
- Peru
- Piauí
- Poland
- Portugal
- Puerto Rico
- Qatar
- Queensland
- Rhode Island
- Rio Grande do Norte
- Rio Grande do Sul
- Rio de Janeiro (state)
- Romania
- Rondônia
- Roraima
- Russia
- Rwanda
- Saba
- Saint Helena, Ascension and Tristan da Cunha
- Saint Kitts and Nevis
- Saint Lucia
- Saint Vincent and the Grenadines
- Samoa
- San Marino
- Santa Catarina
- Saudi Arabia
- Scotland
- Senegal
- Serbia
- Sergipe
- Seychelles
- Sierra Leone
- Singapore
- Sint Eustatius
- Sint Maarten
- Slovakia
- Slovenia
- Solomon Islands
- Somalia
- Somaliland
- South Africa
- South Australia
- South Carolina
- South Dakota
- South Korea
- South Ossetia
- South Sudan
- Spain
- Sri Lanka
- Sudan
- Suriname
- Sweden
- Switzerland
- Syria
- São Paulo (state)
- São Tomé and Príncipe
- Taiwan
- Tajikistan
- Tamil Nadu
- Tanzania
- Tasmania
- Tennessee
- Texas
- Thailand
- Tibet
- Timor-Leste
- Togo
- Tokelau
- Tokyo
- Tonga
- Transnistria
- Trinidad and Tobago
- Tunisia
- Turkey
- Turkmenistan
- Tuvalu
- Uganda
- Ukraine
- Uruguay
- Utah
- Uzbekistan
- Vanuatu
- Vatican City
- Venezuela
- Vermont
- Victoria
- Vietnam
- Virginia
- Washington (state)
- West Virginia
- Western Australia
- Wisconsin
- Wyoming
- Yemen
- Zambia
- Zimbabwe
- the 18th century
- the 19th century
- the Australian Capital Territory
- the Bahamas
- the British Virgin Islands
- the Caribbean
- the Cayman Islands
- the Central African Republic
- the Commonwealth of Nations
- the Comoros
- the Cook Islands
- the Czech Republic
- the Democratic Republic of the Congo
- the District of Columbia
- the Dominican Republic
- the European Union
- the Falkland Islands
- the Faroe Islands
- the Federal District (Brazil)
- the Federated States of Micronesia
- the Gambia
- the German Democratic Republic
- the Isle of Man
- the Ivory Coast
- the Maldives
- the Marshall Islands
- the Middle East
- the Navajo Nation
- the Netherlands
- the Northern Mariana Islands
- the Northern Territory
- the Philippines
- the Pitcairn Islands
- the Republic of Ireland
- the Republic of the Congo
- the Sahrawi Arab Democratic Republic
- the Sovereign Military Order of Malta
- the State of Palestine
- the Turks and Caicos Islands
- the United Arab Emirates
- the United Kingdom
- the United States
- the United States Virgin Islands
- the post-Soviet states

=== Ideology ===
- Socialism and LGBTQ rights
- Communism and LGBTQ rights
- Libertarian perspectives on LGBTQ rights

== Bibliography ==
- LGBTQ literature
- Bisexual literature
- Gay literature
  - Gay New York
  - G-men (magazine)
- Lesbian literature
- LGBTQ themes in comics
  - LGBTQ themes in anime and manga
    - Bara (genre)
    - Yaoi
      - Shotacon
    - Yuri (genre)
- LGBTQ themes in speculative fiction
- Slash fiction
  - Femslash
- Transgender literature
- LGBTQ literature in Argentina
- LGBTQ literature in Colombia
- LGBTQ literature in Ecuador
- LGBTQ literature in El Salvador
- LGBTQ literature in Iceland
- LGBTQ literature in Mexico
- LGBTQ literature in Singapore
- LGBTQ literature in Spain
- LGBTQ literature in the Dutch-language area
- Black lesbian literature in the United States

== Lists ==
- Lists of LGBTQ people
  - LGB people
    - Bisexual people
    - Pansexual people
  - Transgender people
    - Non-binary people
  - Intersex people
  - Aromantic people
  - Asexual people
  - LGBTQ writers
  - Cross-dressers
  - Lists of LGBTQ politicians
    - List of LGBTQ holders of political offices in Australia
  - List of LGBTQ Jews
- LGBTQ-related films
- LGBTQ characters in graphic arts
  - LGBTQ-related webcomics
  - List of gay characters in anime
  - List of yaoi anime and manga
- Lists of LGBTQ figures in fiction and myth
  - List of BL dramas
- List of LGBTQ-related awards
- List of gender identities
- LGBTQ community centers in the US
- LGBTQ events
- LGBTQ holidays
- List of LGBTQ periodicals
- Years in LGBTQ rights
- List of LGBTQ rights articles by region
- Healthcare and the LGBTQ community
- List of LGBTQ-related organizations and conferences
  - List of LGBTQ rights organizations
  - List of LGBTQ organizations that affiliate with political parties
  - List of LGBTQ medical organizations
  - List of bisexuality-related organizations

=== Lists of LGBTQ fictional characters ===
  - List of fictional lesbian characters
  - List of fictional gay characters
  - List of fictional bisexual characters
  - List of fictional pansexual characters
  - List of fictional trans characters
  - List of fictional non-binary characters
  - List of fictional intersex characters
  - List of fictional aromantic characters
  - List of fictional asexual characters

== Anti-LGBTQ topics ==
- AIDS stigma – prejudice against people with HIV+ and AIDS
- Amatonormativity – is the set of societal assumptions that everyone prospers with an exclusive romantic relationship
- Anti-LGBTQ hate groups
- Anti-homosexual attitudes – societal attitudes against homosexuality
- Anti-LGBTQ rhetoric – themes, catchphrases, and slogans which have been used to condemn or demean LGBTQ people
  - Homophobic propaganda – propaganda based on negative and homophobia towards homosexual, putatively homosexual and sometimes other non-heterosexual or non-cisgender people
  - LGBTQ grooming conspiracy theory - far-right conspiracy theory that those in the LGBTQ community and allies are either grooming children or enabling grooming
  - Rapid-onset gender dysphoria - the scientifically unsupported hypothesis that adolescents identity as transgender or experience gender dysphoria due to social contagion.
- Cairo 52 – in Egypt, fifty-two men charged with "habitual practice of debauchery" and "obscene behaviour" under Article 9c of Law No. 10 of 1961
- Cissexism or cisnormativity– bias in favor of people who identify with the gender assigned to them at birth
  - Transphobia – antipathy toward transgender people
  - Anti-gender movement – movement which seeks to discredit gender in favor of assigned sex
  - Anti-transgender movement in the United Kingdom
  - TERF – acronym for Trans-exclusionary radical feminism
  - Trans-exclusionary radical feminism or Gender-critical feminism, anti-trans movement
  - Transmisogyny – antipathy toward trans women
  - Trans panic defense – a legal strategy in which a defendant claims they acted in a state of violent, temporary insanity
- Criminalization of homosexuality
- Criminalization of transgender people
- Criminalization of gender-affirming care
- Discrimination against gay men
- Discrimination against LGBTQ people
- Discrimination against intersex people
- Discrimination against lesbians
- Discrimination against non-binary gender people
- Drag panic - a moral panic that drag is harmful to minors
- Ego-dystonic sexual orientation – mental disorder of having a sexual orientation or an attraction that is at odds with one's idealized self-image
- Ex-gay movement – people who once identified as homosexual or bisexual, but who no longer assert that identity
- Heteronormativity – lifestyle norms that holds that people fall into distinct and complementary genders with natural roles in life
- Heterosexism – attitudes, bias, and discrimination in favor of heterosexuality or heterosexual people
  - Homophobia – antipathy toward homosexual people
  - Lesbophobia – antipathy toward lesbians
  - Biphobia – antipathy toward bisexual people
  - Panphobia – Dislike or prejudice against pansexuality or pansexual people.
  - Acephobia – antipathy toward asexual people
  - Arophobia - antipathy toward aromantic people.
- Intersex medical intervention human rights issues
- Intersex infanticide
- Queer erasure – tendency to intentionally or unintentionally remove LGBTQ groups or people from record, or downplay their significance
  - Conversion therapy – pseudoscientific practice of attempting to change an individual's sexual orientation or gender identity.
  - Censorship of LGBTQ issues
  - Anti-LGBTQ curriculum laws in the U.S. - laws limiting the inclusion of LGBTQ subjects in public schools.
  - Book bans due to LGBTQ content in the U.S.
  - Intersex erasure
  - Lesbian erasure
  - Bisexual erasure
  - Straightwashing – portraying LGB or otherwise queer characters in fiction as heterosexual
  - Capital punishment for homosexuality
  - Gay gang murders – a series of suspected anti-LGBTQ hate crimes perpetrated by large gangs of youths in Sydney, between 1970 and 2010
  - Anti-gay purges in Chechnya – forced disappearances, secret abductions, imprisonment, torture and extrajudicial killing by authorities targeting persons based on their perceived sexual orientation
- LGBTQ rights opposition – opposition to legal rights for LGBTQ people
  - LGBTQ-free zone
  - 2020s anti-LGBTQ movement in the United States
    - Persecution of transgender people under the second Trump administration
  - 21st-century anti-trans movement in the United Kingdom
- LGBTQ stereotypes
- Violence against LGBTQ people – violence motivated by sexuality or gender identity
  - Corrective rape - rape motivated against the victim's perceived sexual orientation or gender non-conformity; it is often intended make the victim heterosexual
  - Gay bashing – verbal or physical abuse against a person who is perceived by the aggressor to be gay, lesbian, or bisexual
  - Gay panic defense – a legal defence for assault or homicide alleging a sexual advance by the victim against the assailant
  - List of people killed for being transgender
  - Trans bashing – the act of victimizing a person physically, sexually, or verbally because they are transgender or transsexual

== Other topics ==
- LGBTQ conservatism
  - LGBTQ conservatism in the United States
- LGBTQ demographics of the United States
- LGBTQ employment discrimination in the United States
- LGBTQ refugees and asylum seekers in Canada
- LGBTQ retirement issues in the United States
- LGBTQ tourism
  - LGBTQ tourism in Brazil
- LGBTQ visibility in the Eurovision Song Contest
- Queer advocacy in the Gaza war

== See also ==
- Outline of transgender topics
- Bibliography of works on the United States military and LGBTQ topics
- Gay-friendly
- Healthcare and the LGBTQ community
  - LGBTQ health
  - LGBTQ health in South Korea
  - LGBTQ healthcare in the United States Veterans Health Administration
- Hermaphrodite
- Homosexuality and psychology
- LGBTQ youth vulnerability
- LGBTQ psychology
- Mental disorders and gender
- Mental health of LGBTQ people
- Suicide among LGBTQ people
  - List of suicides of LGBTQ people
  - Sexual orientation and suicide
  - Sex and gender in suicide
- Transgender youth
- Neuroqueer theory
