= Homosexuality and Pentecostalism =

Pentecostal denominations' views on homosexuality

Pentecostal viewpoints concerning homosexuality are varied worldwide, since there is no one organization that represents all Pentecostals. However, most Pentecostal denominations condemn homosexuality as going against scriptural teachings, though there are some affirming Pentecostal denominations.

== History ==
The movement to create gay-affirming churches began in 1968 with the founding of the Metropolitan Community Church.

Affirming Oneness Pentecostals first began to organize separately from mainline Oneness Pentecostal churches in 1980 in Schenectady, New York. Trinitarian Pentecostal churches, like those in The Covenant Network, were also established.

== Views by denomination ==
=== Holiness Pentecostalism ===
==== Apostolic Faith Church ====
The Apostolic Faith Church, a Holiness Pentecostal denomination founded in founded in 1907, states in its manual that homosexuality is specifically mentioned in the New Testament as a sin.

==== Church of God (Cleveland) ====
The Church of God (Cleveland) states in a 2004 resolution entitled Family that "the Church of God unequivocally affirms that marriage is a covenant relationship between a man and woman and rejects all attempts to redefine marriage in terms of same-sex unions and behavior."

==== Church of God in Christ ====
The Church of God in Christ (COGIC) reaffirmed its stance on homosexuality in a 2014 resolution at its General Assembly Holy Convocation. The statement states that it "unequivocally" affirms marriage as between one man and one woman and that it "strongly opposes any legal sanction of marriage outside of its biblical context."

==== International Pentecostal Holiness Church ====
The International Pentecostal Holiness Church (IPHC) states that "the teaching of the Bible that sexual immorality, including homosexuality, is sinful." The stance was reaffirmed during its 2022 General Conference.

==== Redeemed Christian Church of God ====
The Redeemed Christian Church of God believes that lesbianism and homosexuality are sinful. Its Sunday School Teaching Manual states that homosexuality is forbidden and considered an abomination by God.

=== Finished Work Pentecostalism ===
==== Trinitarian ====
===== Apostolic Church of Pentecost =====
The Apostolic Church of Pentecost statement of belief says that marriage is a "lifelong exclusive commitment between one man and one woman."

===== Assemblies of God =====
The Assemblies of God, the largest Pentecostal organization, states in a 2014 position paper that "there is absolutely no affirmation of homosexual activity, same-sex marriage, or changes in sexual identity found anywhere in Scripture" and that homosexual behavior is a sin.

===== Foursquare Church =====
The Foursquare Church stated in a 1993 denominational statement that marriage is "exclusively within the context of male-female relationship" and that "the Scriptures identify the practice of homosexuality as a sin."

===== Open Bible Churches =====
Open Bible Churches states in a 1980 resolution (later updated in 1984) that "the Holy Scriptures condemn practicing homosexuality and give no basis for approving this as an acceptable lifestyle."

===== Pentecostal Church of God =====
The Pentecostal Church of God affirms in its bylaws that marriage is between one man and one woman, and states that "homosexuality is not compatible with Christian ministry."

===== The Covenant Network =====
The Covenant Network is an LGBTQ-affirming organization founded in 2000 by Randy and Johnny Layton-Morgan of New Covenant Church in Atlanta, Georgia. They state that "all people regardless of age, race, gender identity, sexual orientation + identity, social status, etc. can receive the born-again experience through Jesus Christ." According to a denomination census released in 2023, it has 18 churches in 3 countries.

===== The Fellowship =====
The Fellowship (FGFCMI) states in its beliefs that "any form of homosexuality, lesbianism, bisexuality, bestiality, incest, fornication, adultery, and pornography are sinful perversions of God’s gift of sex."

==== Oneness ====
===== Affirming Pentecostal Church International =====
The Affirming Pentecostal Church International is an LGBTQ-affirming organization with 32 churches in the US and ministries in 24 countries. Its statement of belief says, "We believe that God is no respecter of persons in the forming of marriages. We believe that God's ideal for sexual expression is that it be only between two people, both of lawful age, both fully consenting, unrelated, and united by love in partnership."

===== Apostolic Assembly of the Faith in Christ Jesus =====
The Apostolic Assembly of the Faith in Christ Jesus' Constitution states that "the only legitimate marriage is the joining of one man and one woman" and that homosexuality is a "[perversion] of God’s gift of sex."

===== Assemblies of the Lord Jesus Christ =====
The Assemblies of the Lord Jesus Christ states in its Constitution that homosexuality is both "sinful and offensive to God" and that marriage is exclusively a "covenantal union before God of one man and one woman for life."

===== IEANJESUS =====
The Iglesia Evangelica Apostolica del Nombre de Jesus (IEANJESUS) states that homosexual relations are always immoral and that the Bible expressly forbids same-sex relationships.

===== New Journey Ministries =====
New Journey Ministries (formerly the Global Alliance of Affirming Apostolic Pentecostals, or GAAAP) is an LGBTQ-affirming organization formed in 2007 in Tampa, Florida that currently has ministries in four countries. It describes itself as one of the first "welcoming and affirming, LGBTQ+ communities of faith."

===== Pentecostal Assemblies of the World =====
The Pentecostal Assemblies of the World reaffirmed its stance in an official release from August 2018 that marriage is solely between one man and one woman.

===== Reconciling Pentecostals International =====
Reconciling Pentecostals International (RPI) is an LGBTQ-affirming organization founded in 1998 in Little Rock, Arkansas with a meeting of five Apostolic ministers who were interested in forming an affirming Pentecostal ministry. Following a second meeting in Fall 1999 in Tampa, Florida, two of the ministers, Douglas E. Clanton and Robert L. Morgan, officially organized the RPI in Tampa in June 2000. The RPI is affiliated with seven churches in the U.S. and the Philippines. Its denominal beliefs state that "same-sex relationships are held to exactly the same Biblical standard as heterosexual relationships in the sight of God."

===== United Pentecostal Church International =====
The United Pentecostal Church International (UPCI), in a position paper from 2015, states that homosexuality is contrary to biblical teaching and states that God's plan is "heterosexuality, with definite boundaries between sexes in both appearance and behavior."
