= Lists of LGBTQ figures in fiction and myth =

The large amount of lists of LGBTQ characters and media within the scope of "fiction and myth" has been divided into the following:

== Lists ==
=== Characters ===
==== By medium ====
- List of animated series with LGBTQ characters
  - LGBT representation in animated web series
  - List of gay characters in animation
  - List of lesbian characters in animation
  - List of non-binary characters in animation
- List of LGBTQ-related films
  - List of feature films with bisexual characters
  - List of feature films with gay characters
  - List of feature films with intersex characters
  - List of feature films with lesbian characters
  - List of feature films with transgender characters
  - List of film franchises with LGBT characters
  - List of made-for-television films with LGBTQ characters
- List of graphic art works with LGBTQ characters
- List of LGBTQ characters in modern written fiction
- List of LGBTQ characters in radio and podcasts
- List of LGBTQ characters in soap operas
- Lists of television programs with LGBTQ characters
  - List of bisexual characters in television
  - List of gay characters in television
  - List of lesbian characters in television
  - List of transgender characters in television
- List of video games with LGBTQ characters
- List of webcomics with LGBTQ characters

==== By type ====
- List of fictional aromantic characters
- List of fictional asexual characters
- List of fictional bisexual characters
- List of fictional gay characters
- List of fictional intersex characters
- List of fictional lesbian characters
- List of fictional non-binary characters
- List of fictional pansexual characters
- List of fictional polyamorous characters
- List of fictional trans characters

=== Themes ===
- LGBTQ themes in comics
  - LGBTQ themes in American mainstream comics
- LGBTQ themes in horror fiction
- LGBTQ themes in mythology
  - LGBTQ themes in African diasporic mythologies
  - LGBTQ themes in Chinese mythology
  - Homoerotic themes in Greek and Roman mythology
  - LGBTQ themes in Hindu mythology
- List of LGBTQ-themed speculative fiction
- LGBTQ themes in video games

== See also ==
- Disney and LGBTQ representation in animation
- Sexuality in The Lord of the Rings
- Sexuality in Star Trek
