= Homosexuality in football =

Homosexuality in football may refer to:

- Homosexuality and bisexuality in American football
- Homosexuality in association football
- Homosexuality in Australian rules football
- Homosexuality in English football

== See also ==
- Homosexuality in sports
