= LGBTQ history in Vermont =

LGBTQ communities have been present in the American state of Vermont since the 1970s. Local legislation has granted protections to LGBT residents since the 1980s, and the state's first Pride parade was held in the state's largest city, Burlington, in June 1983.

== 19th century ==
In the first half of the 19th century, Weybridge residents Charity Bryant and Sylvia Drake were treated as a married couple by the community following their years of commitment to each other. The two were buried together in the town and shared a single headstone.

== 20th century ==
Between the 1960s and 1980s, LGBTQ life in Vermont was fairly decentralized. LGBTQ residents would often travel to events out of state, in locales such as Boston, Montreal, or New York City.

=== 1970s ===
Andrews Inn in Bellows Falls has been cited as the state's first gay bar. Local resident John Moises, an openly gay man, opened the inn in 1973 in a building that had been owned by his family. In addition to being a meeting place for local LGBT residents, the inn also served as a stopover point for LGBT travelers going to and from Montreal and Boston. However, the family sold the business to new owners in the late 1970s, after which the bar faced more scrutiny and backlash from the local community. It closed in 1984.

The early 1970s also saw lesbian and feminist activism in the state. Daughters, Inc., a women-owned publishing press in Plainfield, published the lesbian novel Rubyfruit Jungle in 1973. Barbara Gittings visited the state to speak with local lesbian groups. In the mid-1970s, lesbian and feminist groups founded Women Against Rape in Burlington. In 1977, around 50 lesbians from Burlington attended the 2nd Michigan Womyn’s Music Festival. The decade also saw a number of small lesbian collectives in the state.

In 1976, the Gay Student Union was founded at the University of Vermont by Wilda White. The group advocated for LGBT rights in the state and hosted social events such as dances and conferences. Coordinated homophobic activism against gays and lesbians in Vermont trailed behind local LGBT groups, some of whom were able to speak at high schools and colleges about their experiences.

Two LGBT publications were released in the state during the decade: Gay in Vermont, beginning in 1972, and Commonwoman, beginning in 1978. Gay in Vermont primarily functioned to spread word about social events, while Commonwoman focused on women's issues and lesbian feminism.

=== 1980s ===
1983 saw the first Pride parade held in the state on June 25. The event, held at City Hall Park in Burlington, was organized by lesbian feminist group Commonwoman and a gay men's group and partially funded by the Boston-based Haymarket People’s Fund. Around 300 people attended. The event was publicly backed by the city's mayor, Bernie Sanders, then in his first term. Several local businesses also supported the rally, although overall support was mixed, with several negative letters being sent to newspapers in the lead-up to June 25.

Beginning in 1983, Burlington was home to Pearl’s, a gay bar also frequented by some LGBTQ women. The bar remained open until June 2006.

In 1984, Vermonters for Lesbian and Gay Rights was founded.

In 1985, Sanders put a city ordinance into place which prohibited housing discrimination against the "gay community...welfare recipients, the elderly, and the handicapped".

In 1986, the LGBT newspaper Out in the Mountains was founded.

=== 1990s ===
In the 1990s, Vermont gained popularity as a skiing destination for LGBTQ travelers. In December 1993, Out & About rated Vermont as the most LGBTQ-friendly ski destination.

In 1999, RU12? (Are you one too?) Center was founded, which would later be renamed to Pride Center of Vermont.

In December 1999, the Vermont Supreme Court ruled that gay and lesbian couples were entitled to the same benefits under law that were given to married heterosexual couples.

== 21st century ==
=== 2000s ===
Following the December 1999 ruling by the Vermont Supreme Court that gay and lesbian couples were entitled to the same benefits under law as married heterosexual couples, Vermont became the first state in the United States to legalize civil unions.

Same-sex marriage was legalized in the state in 2009.

=== 2010s ===
In 2018, Christine Hallquist won the primary election for Vermont governor, making her the first transgender person to do so.

=== 2020s ===
The 2020s have seen a number of LGBTQ Vermont residents be elected to positions of power within the state.

In 2020, Taylor Small was elected to the Vermont House of Representatives, becoming the state's first openly trans legislator.

In 2021, Becca Balint became the Vermont Senate's President pro tempore, making her the first woman and first openly LGBTQ person to hold the position. In November 2022, Balint was elected to the federal House of Representatives, making her the first openly LGBTQ congressperson and first congresswoman from Vermont.

In 2022, Michael Pieciak became the first openly LGBTQ person to hold the role of Vermont treasurer.

In 2024, Burlington elected Emma Mulvaney-Stanak as mayor, making her the city's first woman mayor and first openly LGBTQ mayor.

== See also ==
- LGBTQ rights in Vermont
