= LGBTQ rights in Tokyo =

LGBTQ rights in the capital of Japan

- Legal status: Legal since 1880
- Gender identity: Change of legal sex allowed since 2004, following sex reassignment surgery
- Discrimination protections: Sexual orientation and gender identity protected

Family rights
- Recognition of relationships: Registered partnerships metropolis-wide since 2022, in several wards and cities since 2015
- Adoption: Ambiguous; second-parent registration allowed through partnership registry since 2022

Tokyo is one of Japan's leading jurisdictions when it comes to civil rights for lesbian, gay, bisexual, and transgender (LGBTQ) people. Jurisdictions in Tokyo were among the first to establish partnership registries for same-sex couples, and Tokyo became the tenth prefecture-level government to establish a registry in November 2022. Previously in 2018, Tokyo became the first prefecture-level government to enact an LGBT-inclusive human rights law protecting against discrimination and hate speech.

== Recognition of same-sex unions ==
=== National recognition ===
Since March 19, 2021, the Supreme Court of Japan has held that common-law marriages may exist between same-sex couples. On March 26, 2024, the Supreme Court overturned a lower-court decision, finding that a man whose same-sex partner was murdered was entitled to the same benefits granted to bereaved family members and classifying the relationship as a common-law marriage.

On June 11, 2024, following the Supreme Court's decision, the Parliamentary League for Considering LGBT Issues petitioned the cabinet to administratively apply provisions in statute regarding common-law marriages to same-sex couples. In January 2025, Minister Junko Mihara announced that 24 national laws regarding common-law marriages would be applied to same-sex couples, while 131 others would be subject to further review. On October 3, nine further laws regarding common-law marriages were extended to same-sex couples, while excluding 120 others.

=== Municipal partnership registries ===
On April 1, 2015, Shibuya in central Tokyo announced it would offer same-sex couples special "partnership certificates" ((Japanese: パートナーシップ宣誓制度, pātonāshippu sensei seido, pronounced [paːtonaːɕi̥ppɯ seɰ̃seː seꜜːdo]), also known as "partnership certification system" (パートナーシップ証明制度, pātonāshippu shōmei seido)). While these licenses are not legally recognized as marriage certificates, they may be used in civil matters such as hospital visitation rights and housing. The Shibuya city office began accepting applications on 28 October 2015. In response to this action by the Shibuya city office, the "Special Committee to Protect Family Ties" (家族の絆を守る特命委員会, kazoku no kizuna wo mamoru tokumei iinkai) of the federal ruling Liberal Democratic Party was formed in March 2015 to discuss the matter. An officer from the Ministry of Justice who was invited to comment stated that the action by Shibuya is legal because the certificate issued is not a marriage certificate and the current Japanese legal code does not prohibit the "partnership" of same-sex couples. In July 2015, Setagaya announced it would be joining Shibuya in issuing partnership certificates from 5 November.

in May 2021, 12 municipalities in Tokyo, Adachi, Bunkyō, Edogawa, Fuchū, Koganei, Kokubunji, Kunitachi, Minato, Nakano, Setagaya, Shibuya and Toshima, agreed to mutually recognize each other's partnership certificates. Other wards, including Tama, Kita, Musashino and Arakawa, have established registries since, with the city of Machida set to launch a registry in March 2023.

On June 21, 2023, the Special Wards Personnel and Welfare Affairs Association, which coordinates the salary system of Tokyo's 23 wards, directed the ward governments to treat same-sex partners of ward employees as "spouses", in line with the Tokyo metropolitan government's policy for their own employees.

==== List of wards and municipalities ====
Cities are bolded:

- Shibuya (28 October 2015)
- Setagaya (5 November 2015)
- Nakano (20 August 2018)
- Edogawa (1 April 2019)
- **Fuchū** (1 April 2019)
- Toshima (1 April 2019)
- Bunkyō (1 April 2020)
- Minato (1 April 2020)
- **Koganei** (20 October 2020)
- **Kokubunji** (15 November 2020)
- Adachi (1 April 2021)
- **Kunitachi** (1 April 2021)
- **Tama** (1 February 2022)
- Kita (1 April 2022)
- Musashino (1 April 2022)
- Arakawa (25 April 2022)
- **Chōfu** (15 March 2023)
- **Hino** (1 April 2023)
- **Machida** (1 April 2023)
- Sumida (1 April 2023)
- Suginami (24 April 2023)
- Itabashi (1 November 2023)
- **Mitaka** (1 April 2024)
- Kōtō (1 July 2025)
- **Tachikawa*** (1 April 2026)

Measures to allow partnership certificates have been proposed in several other administrative wards in Tokyo, such as Chiyoda, Chūō, Katsushika, Nerima, Shinjuku, and Taitō, as well as the city of Higashimurayama.

=== Prefectural-level partnership registry ===
On 7 June 2021, the General Affairs Committee of the Tokyo Metropolitan Assembly unanimously accepted a petition, launched by LGBT activists and signed by 18,000 people, to establish a partnership system in Tokyo Metropolis. Governor Yuriko Koike expressed her support for the move, stating it would "respect the human rights of sexual minorities and promote the understanding of Tokyo citizens regarding diversity". The bill, establishing the "Tokyo Partnership Oath System" (Japanese: 東京都パートナーシップ宣誓制度, romanized: tōkyō to pātonāshippu sensei seido) was enacted by the Metropolitan Assembly on 15 June 2022. It calls on businesses and other entities to treat same-sex partnerships as equal to married couples, allowing couples to access family-use housing, the right to visit their partners in hospital, and to respect children designated as members of the household. In addition, same-sex partners of metropolitan government employees were extended employee allowances and nursing care leave. At least one partner must be resident in Tokyo or a commuter for work. It came into force on 1 November, with applications being accepted from 10 October, making Tokyo the tenth and most-populous prefecture to do so. The Metropolitan Government also completed a mutual recognition agreement with those cities and wards in Tokyo which had already established their own registries since 2015, ensuring that partnerships registered by these cities since would be recognized and affirmed throughout all of Tokyo's cities and wards. On 30 March 2023, this mutual recognition was extended to the city of Chōfu and the wards of Sumida, Suginami, Machida and Hino.

The registry also accepts opposite-sex couples in common-law marriages. On 31 March, 2025, Tokyo Metropolitan Government signed a mutual recognition agreement with Gunma Prefecture, the first agreement signed by the prefecture with a government outside of the metropolis. Another was signed with Ibaraki Prefecture on 14 April. Such mutual recognition allows for simplifying procedures for relocation and expanding the private services accessible through registered partnerships between jurisdictions.

=== Same-sex marriage litigation ===
==== 2020 Tokyo High Court ruling ====
A lawsuit was filed by a Tokyo couple on 14 February (Valentine's Day), 2019, and was among several such lawsuits filed that day in other jurisdictions. The plaintiffs, Chizuka Oe and Yoko Ogawa, a couple for 25 years, argued that banning same-sex marriage violates articles 13 and 14 of the Constitution.

On 4 March 2020, the Tokyo High Court ruled that cohabiting same-sex couples should be entitled to the same legal benefits as those granted to cohabiting heterosexual couples. This ruling provided legitimacy to the plaintiff's same-sex relationship, allowing the plaintiff to sue her lesbian partner of seven years for infidelity, a move that was previously restricted to heterosexual partners. The decision was upheld by the Supreme Court of Japan on 18 March 2021.

=== Statistics ===
As of June 2022, 604 same-sex partnerships had been registered within Tokyo's cities and wards. By 31 December 2022, 407 certificates had been issued by the metropolitan government. By 30 November 2023, the number of metropolitan-issued certificates had grown to 994 certificates.

== Adoption and family planning ==
Same-sex couples are not allowed to legally adopt in Japan. Lesbian couples and single women are unable to access IVF and artificial insemination.

In April 2021, Adachi became the first ward in Tokyo to establish a "partnership family system" (パートナーシップ・ファミリーシップ制度, pātonāshippu famirīshippu seido), an extension of the partnership oath system which also recognises the children of same-sex couples, and allows partners to make medical decisions for their child, and to pick up their children at schools and kindergartens (whereas previously only the biological parent was allowed to pick up the child). Setagaya reformed their existing partnership system in November 2022 to include the designation of partners' children.

Tokyo's prefectural partnership certificates were designed from the outset to allow the inclusion of the names of children within the partnerships, becoming the first prefecture-level registry to do so. The range of same-sex partners' rights and responsibilities for children in the family has yet to be formally determined.

== Discrimination protections and hate crime law ==
In October 2018, the Tokyo Metropolitan Assembly passed a law prohibiting all discrimination on the basis of sexual orientation and gender identity, including in employment. The law, which took effect in April 2019, also commits the Metropolitan Government to raise awareness of LGBT people and "conduct measures needed to make sure human rights values are rooted in all corners of the city". The law outlaws expressing hateful rhetoric in public. Prior to this, the wards of Shibuya and Setagaya (March 2018) had already passed explicit protections for LGBT people.

In 1990, the group OCCUR (Japan Association for the Lesbian and Gay Movement) won a court case against a Tokyo government policy that barred gay and lesbian youth from using the "Metropolitan House for Youth". While the court ruling does not seem to have extended to other areas of government-sponsored discrimination, it is cited by the courts as a civil rights case.

== LGBT life ==
=== Politics ===
Several milestones in LGBT political history have taken place in Tokyo Metropolis.

In 2003, Aya Kamikawa became the first openly transgender politician to be elected to public office in Japan, winning a seat on the Setagaya Ward Assembly. She initially ran as an independent but expressed support for the now-defunct Rainbow and Greens party and later unsuccessfully ran for the National Parliament as a member of the Democratic Party of Japan.

In 2010, Tokyo Governor Shintaro Ishihara faced international criticism for controversial comments he made, in which he said that gays and lesbians were "deficient somehow. It may be attributed to something genetic. I feel sorry for them being a minority."

In 2011, Taiga Ishikawa became one of the first two openly-gay men elected to office in Japan, winning a seat in the local assembly of Toshima Ward. He came out publicly in his book Where Is My Boyfriend (2002), and started a non-profit organization that sponsors social events for gay men in Japan. Wataru Ishizaka, also openly gay, was elected in the same election to the Nakano ward council in Tokyo.

At the 2019 House of Councillors election, Ishikawa won a seat in the House of Councillors as a member of the CDP, the first openly gay man to do so. After his election, he vowed to legalize same-sex marriage and enact anti-discrimination laws within the six years of his term.

During the country's 2017 general election, Tokyo Governor Yuriko Koike's newly launched Party of Hope pledged the elimination of LGBT discrimination in its manifesto.

== See also ==
- LGBT culture in Tokyo
- LGBT rights in Japan
- Recognition of same-sex unions in Japan
