= LGBTQ rights in Ibaraki Prefecture =

LGBTQ rights in a prefecture of Japan

Ibaraki Prefecture was the first prefecture of Japan and in the Kantō region to introduce a partnership registry for same-sex couples, as well as the second in the country to pass LGBT-inclusive nondiscrimination protections.

== Recognition of same-sex relationships and families ==
=== National recognition ===
Since March 19, 2021, the Supreme Court of Japan has held that common-law marriages may exist between same-sex couples. On March 26, 2024, the Supreme Court overturned a lower-court decision, finding that a man whose same-sex partner was murdered was entitled to the same benefits granted to bereaved family members and classifying the relationship as a common-law marriage.

On June 11, 2024, following the Supreme Court's decision, the Parliamentary League for Considering LGBT Issues petitioned the cabinet to administratively apply provisions in statute regarding common-law marriages to same-sex couples. In January 2025, Minister Junko Mihara announced that 24 national laws regarding common-law marriages would be applied to same-sex couples, while 131 others would be subject to further review. On October 3, nine further laws regarding common-law marriages were extended to same-sex couples, while excluding 120 others.

=== Prefectural recognition ===
In January 2019, the Government of Ibaraki Prefecture announced it was considering introducing a partnership system for same-sex couples in April 2019. In March 2019, Governor Kazuhiko Ōigawa expressed his personal support for the introduction of such a scheme. The Ibaraki Prefectural Assembly began examining legislation to this effect in June 2019. The prefecture has offered partnership certificates since July 1, 2019, which made it the first prefecture to do so. As of June 2022, at least 71 partnerships were registered in Ibaraki Prefecture.

On 18 August 2022, the Ibaraki prefectural government announced they would recognize Saga Prefecture's partnership certificates, becoming the first prefectures to do so. Similar agreements were signed by Ibaraki with Tochigi and Gunma on 20 December, Mie on 31 January 2023, and Toyama.on September 4, 2023. An agreement was signed by the prefecture with the city of Saitama in Saitama Prefecture on October 30, 2023. On October 23, 2024, the prefectural government announced its accession to the Partnership System Inter-Municipality Collaboration Network to mutually recognize the registries of 18 other prefectures and 150 municipalities.

== Discrimination protections ==
In March 2019, legislation banning discrimination against "sexual minorities" was passed in Ibaraki Prefecture.
