= LGBTQ rights in Akita Prefecture =

LGBTQ rights in a prefecture of Japan

Akita Prefecture was the seventh prefecture to create a registry for same-sex partnerships and the third prefecture to prohibit employment discrimination on the basis of sexual orientation and gender identity.

== Recognition of same-sex relationships and families ==
=== National recognition ===
Since March 19, 2021, the Supreme Court of Japan has held that common-law marriages may exist between same-sex couples. On March 26, 2024, the Supreme Court overturned a lower-court decision, finding that a man whose same-sex partner was murdered was entitled to the same benefits granted to bereaved family members and classifying the relationship as a common-law marriage.

On June 11, 2024, following the Supreme Court's decision, the Parliamentary League for Considering LGBT Issues petitioned the cabinet to administratively apply provisions in statute regarding common-law marriages to same-sex couples. In January 2025, Minister Junko Mihara announced that 24 national laws regarding common-law marriages would be applied to same-sex couples, while 131 others would be subject to further review. On October 3, nine further laws regarding common-law marriages were extended to same-sex couples, while excluding 120 others.

=== Prefectural and municipal recognition ===
A partnership oath system has also been in effect in Akita Prefecture since 1 April 2022. In addition, Akita City also passed a partnership registry in April 2022. On October 23, 2024, Akita Prefecture joined the Partnership System Inter-Municipality Collaboration Network.

== Discrimination protections ==
In April 2022, legislation prohibiting discrimination among others sexual orientation and gender identity came into operation in Akita Prefecture.
