= Guede Nibo =

Leader of the spirits of the dead in Haitian Vodou

Gede Nibo
- Gravestones, cemeteries
- Venerated in: Haitian Vodou, Folk Catholicism
- Attributes: Black coat, top hat, staff, cigar, rum, skull, obscenities

Gede Nibo (Note: Alternative spellings and variations include Guédé Nibo, Guédé-Nibo, Guede-Nibo, Ghede Nibo, Gédé Nibo, Gédé Nibbo, Gédé Nibho, Guede Nibho, Guede Nibbho, Guede Ni-Bo, and Ti Puce.) (Haitian Creole: Gede Nibo) is a lwa who is leader of the spirits of the dead in Haitian Vodou. Formerly human, Gede Nibo was a handsome young man who was killed violently. After death, he was adopted as a lwa by Baron Samedi and Maman Brigitte. He is envisioned as an effeminate, nasal dandy. Nibo wears a black riding coat or drag. When he inhabits humans, they are inspired to lascivious sexuality of all kinds.

== Function and depiction ==
Gede Nibo is a rada lwa who is considered to be a great healer. He is seen carrying a bottle of white rum infused with medicinal herbs, and often carries a staff and smokes a cigar. Nibo is the special patron of those who die young, and as such is often conflated with the Catholic saint Gerard Majella, who is depicted with a skull. Nibo is the guardian of the graves of those who died prematurely, particularly those whose final resting place is unknown. He is a psychopomp, an intermediary between the living and the dead. He gives voice to the dead spirits that have not been reclaimed from (The Lower World) or in Vodou terms "below the waters", and his chwals ("horses", possessed devotees) can give voice to the dead spirits whose bodies have not been found.

== Service ==
Purple is considered his sacred color, and usual offerings include black goats, black roosters, calabash, cigars, coconut, fried plantains, pistachios, smoked herrings, sweet sesame balls, and white rum spiced with African bird pepper.

Until recently, Haitian farmers would perform a praise song to Guede Nibo each November. It involved phallic thrusts and other erotic gestures and was named "Massissi", a Haitian term for a "homoerotically inclined male".

== In popular culture ==
- The Disney villain character Dr. Facilier in the animated film The Princess and the Frog is loosely modeled on Guede Nibo.
- Baron Samedi (as the head of the Guede family of loa) is mentioned in the second novel in Ian Fleming's James Bond series of stories Live and Let Die.

== See also ==
- LGBT themes in African diasporic mythologies
