= LGBTQ topics in the United States =

LGBTQ in the United States may refer to:

- LGBTQ history in the United States
  - Timeline of LGBTQ history in the United States
- LGBTQ rights in the United States
- LGBTQ people in the United States
- LGBTQ movements in the United States
- LGBTQ demographics of the United States
- LGBT adoption in the United States
- LGBT historic places in the United States
- LGBTQ conservatism in the United States
- LGBT employment discrimination in the United States
- LGBT retirement issues in the United States
- Homosexuality in sports in the United States
- Same-sex marriage in the United States
- Same-sex marriage law in the United States by state
- Same-sex marriage law in the United States by territory
- Same-sex marriage legislation in the United States
- Same-sex unions in the United States
- Same-sex immigration policy of the United States
