= Timeline of LGBTQ history in Norway =

Notable events in LGBT history in Norway include:

== 17th Century ==
- 1674 - A military officer in the Norwegian Army was accused of forcing his subordinate soldiers to perform homosexual acts. He fled the country, his wife got a divorce, and the case was dropped.
- 1693 - Aron Åsulsen was convicted of sodomy, in Kragerø. The only known person convicted for homosexuality in Norwegian history before 1842. He was sentenced to whipping, branding, and banishment from Kragerø.

== 20th Century and 21st Century ==
- 1965 - Kim Friele was the first gay Norwegian to publicly acknowledge and advocate for her sexuality, in June 1965.
- 1968 - The penal code's paragraph 213 was the order for the punishment (straffebud) of homosexual men. In June 1968 then minister of justice said that "it is not stated, if the paragraph should be lifted [or removed]". A different government came to power in 1969.
- 1970 - A question was registered for interpellation in Parliament, by representative Arne Kielland. The Borten Government had no intent to answer the interpellation, but forwarded a law proposal about the age of sexual consent for gay males—18 years, while the age limit for all others was 16 years. A different government came to power in March 1971.
- 1972 - Homosexuality in Norway was decriminalised in 1972.
- 1993 - Same-sex civil unions were accepted by Norwegian law in 1993.
- 2009 - The law legalizing same-sex marriage in Norway took effect on 1 January 2009.
