= IEANJESUS =

Iglesia Evangélica Apostólica del Nombre de Jesús
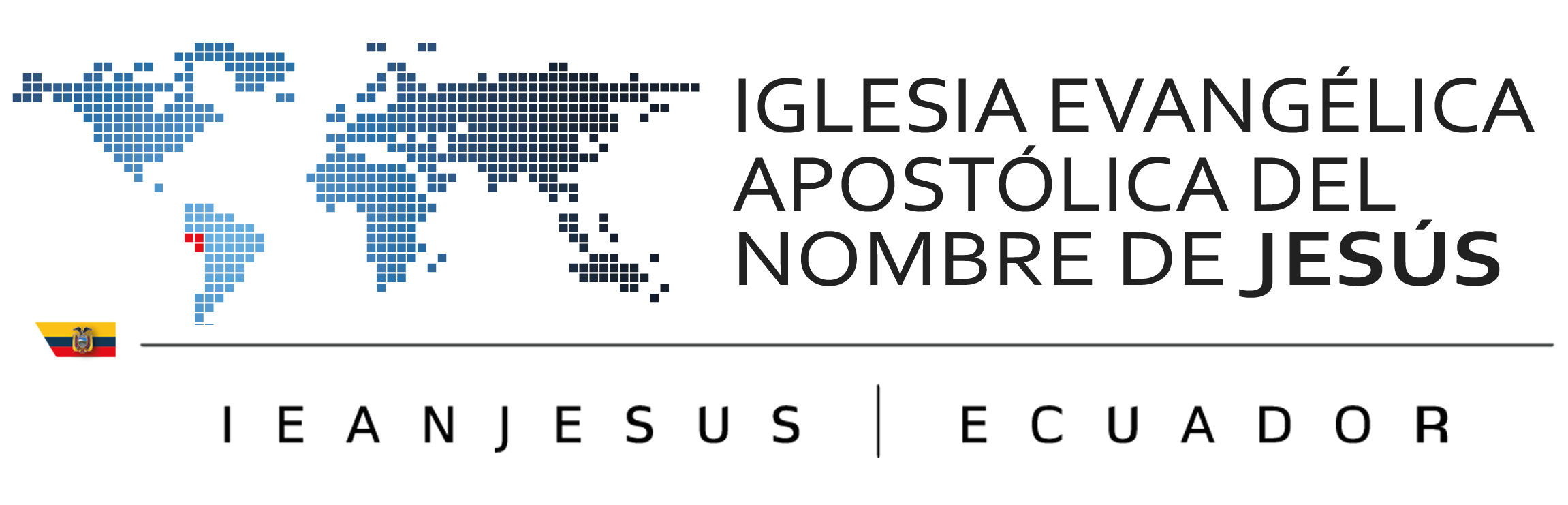
- Logo
- Abbreviation: IEANJESUS
- Classification: Western Christian
- Orientation: Pentecostal
- Theology: Oneness Pentecostalism
- Origin: 1959; Quito, Ecuador
- Separated from: Iglesia Pentecostal Unida de Colombia
- Congregations: 1,059
- Members: 350,000
- Other name: Igreja Evangelica Apostolica do Nome de Jesus Chiesa Evangelica Apostolica nel Nome di Gesù
- Official website: https://www.ieanjesus.org.ec

The Iglesia Evangélica Apostólica del Nombre de Jesús, also known as IEANJESUS (English: Evangelical Apostolic Church of the Name of Jesus), is the largest Ecuadorian and Peruvian Oneness Pentecostal denomination. The church was founded in 1959 in Quito.
