= LGBTQ history in Honduras =

LGBT in Honduras

Homosexuality in Honduras was decriminalised in 1899. However, the Honduran Penal Code was only reformed in 2013 to include punishment for people who discriminated by sexual orientation. While a small (but persecuted) gay-rights-oriented culture exists in Honduras, certain lower socio-economic barrios (neighborhoods) have seen the persistence of an older social construction of same-sex eroticism (roughly similar to that which existed in much of the U.S. before WWII) whereby masculine "hombres" (young, unmarried men 15-25) play the penetrative role with "locas" (effeminate but non-cross-dressing/non-transgender, older males), usually for some type of remuneration but occasionally also for friendship and mutual assistance. For the "hombres", these acts do not carry the stigma of being seen as "homosexual" (though some taboo exists about open discussion of such relationships); the young men consider themselves fully heterosexual and almost always marry by their mid-twenties, limiting their sexual activity thereafter to women.

Shortly after the 2009 Honduran coup d'état the average yearly murders of LGBT people increased from two to 31. Prominent gay rights activist, Walter Tróchez, was murdered in December 2009 and four years later Walter's friend Germán Mendoza was charged with his murder. The number of LGBT deaths in Honduras from the year 1994 to 2018 has been 323 and only 68 of these murder cases have been prosecuted.

== HIV-based discrimination ==
Employers used HIV status, positive or negative, as a way to determine sexual orientation because in the year 2005 13% of the people with AIDS in Honduras were MSM (men who have sex with men). Honduras had the largest population of people affected by HIV/AIDS in the year 1998 with 50% of the 17% of the AIDS population in Central America coming from Honduras.
