= Scales of sexual orientation =

Classification schemes of different sexual orientations

Scales of sexual orientation are classification schemes of different sexual orientations. Definitions of the term sexual orientation normally include two components: the "psychological" and the "behavioral" component, but definitions of the two components vary between researchers and across time. Those difficulties motivate researchers to define scales to measure and describe sexual orientation. Most sexual behavior and sexual orientation scales are motivated by the view that sexual orientation is a continuum. The Kinsey scale works from a continuum viewpoint and is the most prevalent sexual orientation scale.

== Hirschfeld Scale ==
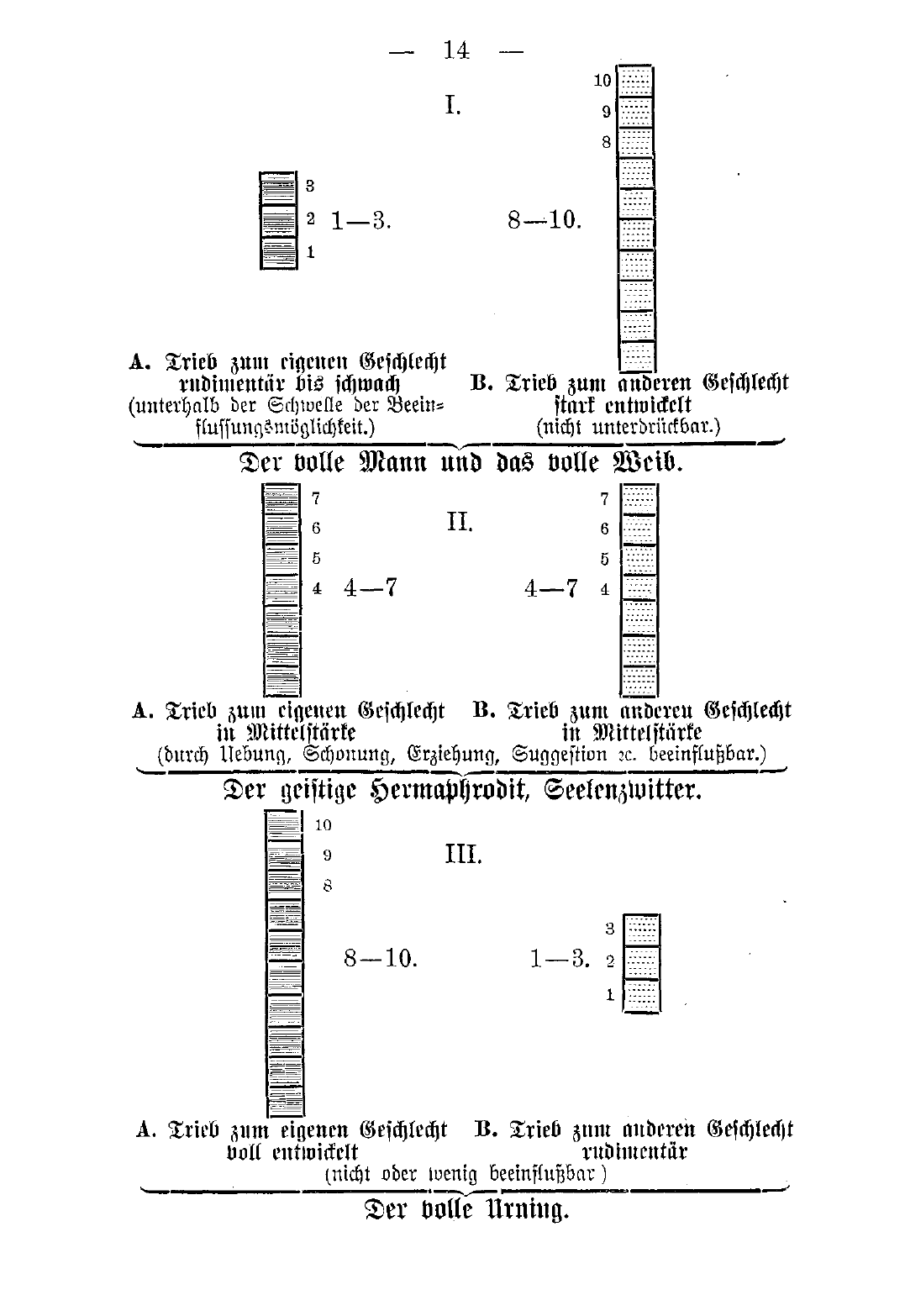
The sexual orientation scale developed by Magnus Hirschfeld in Sappho und Sokrates (1896).

Possibly the first scale that evaluated sexual orientation of a person on a continuum was presented by the German sexologist Magnus Hirschfeld in his 1896 work Sappho und Sokrates.

This scale involved two bars that corresponded to the same and the opposite sex (bars A and B, respectively). The bars could be rated from 1 to 10, with 1 being complete indifference to that sex and 10 being tremendous sexual interest. Hirschfeld suggested that typical heterosexuals (which he called "full man and women") would have scores of A:1-3 / B:8-10; typical bisexuals (which he called "spiritual/mental hermaphrodites") would have graph scores of around 5 for both; and typical homosexuals (which he called "Urnings") would have scores of A:8-10 / B:1-3. Hirschfeld also recognized the existence of people that would score very low on both of these axes, under the label "anesthesia sexualis" (a term coined by Richard von Krafft-Ebing).

Hirschfeld argued that since during early developmental stages of the fetus, the genitalia were undetermined, so were the cerebral "center" that determined sexual orientation; and thus, he considered all humans at this stage both externally hermaphroditic and internally bisexual. He suggested that during fetal (and later pubertal) development, as external sexual characteristics developed, so did orientation towards the other sex grow stronger and suppress the orientation towards the same sex. Thus, Hirschfeld considered bisexuals and homosexuals to have deviations in their cerebral development that led to poorer suppression of the drive for one's own sex and/or lack of growth in the drive for the other sex. Based on this premise, he also argued that fighting against one's own developmental nature was a fruitless task and that their sexual orientations should be accepted as they are.

== Kinsey scale ==
Kinsey scale of sexual responses, indicating degrees of sexual orientation

"The living world is a continuum in each and every one of its aspects. The sooner we learn this concerning human sexual behavior the sooner we shall reach a sound understanding of the realities of sex."

— Kinsey et al., 1948

The Kinsey scale (also Kinsey homosexual-heterosexual scale) was first presented by Alfred Kinsey in his two influential books Sexual Behavior in the Human Male (1948) and Sexual Behavior in the Human Female (1953). The two books are often referred to as "the Kinsey Reports". The scale was used to classify and quantify homosexual and heterosexual behaviour across the American population. It assesses both overt sexual behaviour as well as sexual fantasies.

=== Categories ===
Kinsey used seven categories (0–6) to classify sexual orientation as a continuum plus an additional category labeled X (no socio-sexual contacts or reactions). Equal intervals were assumed between the single categories, except for X. The measurement for sexual behaviour was relative to the subject's full number of sexual encounters, rather than an absolute number of sexual encounters with the same sex.

Rating	Description
0	Exclusively heterosexual
1	Predominantly heterosexual/incidentally homosexual
2	Predominantly heterosexual but more than incidentally homosexual
3	Equally heterosexual and homosexual
4	Predominantly homosexual but more than incidentally heterosexual
5	Predominantly homosexual/only incidentally heterosexual
6	Exclusively homosexual
X	No socio-sexual contacts or reactions

=== Testing method ===
Subject sexual orientation was assessed in a structured personal interview. This interview included around 300-500 questions. Depending on the subject's answers there could be a different order and number of questions. The wording was also not rigidly fixed, but could be adapted to e.g. the subject's level of education. In the interview, it was assumed that participants had tried different kinds of sexual acts, until explicitly negated.

=== Evaluation ===
The Kinsey Reports and the developed scale had a big impact on the perception of human sexuality in general and homosexuality and bisexuality in particular. Before Kinsey, sexual orientation was conceptualized as only three categories: homosexual, heterosexual and bisexual, and homosexual contacts were regarded as rather rare. In his reports Kinsey showed the big variance in sexual orientation in the American population and claimed that homosexual encounters and fantasies were much more common than previously believed.

However, the Kinsey scale also has some shortcomings. The assessment involves the subjective rating of the interviewer. This can have various consequences. Depending on the behaviour and reactions of the interviewer, subjects may or not be willing to disclose their full sexual history. It is also the interviewer who has to define whether the subjects gave honest answers or when to ask further questions. A small number of trained researchers were able to get an insight into sexual behaviour in the American population using the scale, but comparing different studies using the Kinsey scale becomes difficult. Sell finds three shortcomings of the Kinsey scale:

- A single number represents the multidimensional phenomenon of sexual orientation
- Individuals with very different sexual histories and frequencies of sexual contact with the same or opposite sex would be classified with the same number
- Homosexuality and heterosexuality are conceptualized as two ends of the same spectrum. Sell argues to think of both as two different dimensions.

Kinsey acknowledged that sexual orientation is more than sexual attraction or behaviour alone. By evaluating sexual behaviour and fantasy, his scale already took into account more than one dimension, although combined to a single measure, but did not take into account other aspects such as varying sexual orientation during life or emotional preference.

Hansen and Charles criticized that while the scale is successful in categorizing people at both ends of the continuum (exclusively homosexual/heterosexual) its categorization of bisexuals is driven by a negative definition of bisexuality. Bisexuality should be considered a discrete entity not an intermediate step between homosexuality and heterosexuality.

== Klein Sexual Orientation Grid (KSOG) ==
The Klein Sexual Orientation Grid (KSOG) was proposed by Fritz Klein as an alternative to the Kinsey Scale. It was first explained in Forum magazine, in which Klein described the scale and asked readers to fill out the given grid and send him their answers.

It was designed as a further development of the Kinsey Scale. It does not yield one number as in the Kinsey scale but 21, three different numbers (representing past, present and ideal) for each of the seven variables assessed

(A) Sexual Attraction
(B) Sexual Behaviour
(C) Sexual Fantasies
(D) Emotional Preference
(E) Social Preference
(F) Self Identification
(G) Heterosexual-/Gay Lifestyle

=== Testing method ===
Participants are asked to rate themselves regarding these seven variables, giving three numbers for each to rate past, present and ideal.

Variable	Questions	past	present (the past year)	ideal
A	To whom are you sexually attracted?			
B	With whom have you had sex?			
C	About whom are your sexual fantasies?			
D	Who do you feel more drawn to or close to emotionally?			
E	Which gender do you socialize with?			
F	In which community do you like to spend your time? In which do you feel most comfortable?			
G	How do you label or identify yourself?			

For questions A–E the numbers corresponded to:

1	2	3	4	5	6	7
other sex only	other sex mostly	other sex somewhat more	both sexes equally	same sex somewhat more	same sex mostly	same sex only

For questions F and G the numbers corresponded to:

1	2	3	4	5	6	7
heterosexual only	heterosexual mostly	heterosexual somewhat more	heterosexual/homosexual equally	homosexual somewhat more	homosexual mostly	homosexual only

=== Evaluation ===
The KSOG adds more dimensions to the Kinsey scale and is a more fine-grained measure. It also takes into account changes in all seven variables over time. Due to its standardized written form, studies using the KSOG are less dependent on the experimenter and more easily comparable.

Weinrich et al. performed a factor analysis of KSOG scores and noted that one factor loaded substantially on all 21 scores. It might therefore be legitimate to use a scale with fewer dimensions while still accurately measuring sexual orientations.

Ratings in the KSOG are based on the self-assessment of the subjects. If there is a different interpretation of the questions, this will influence the subject's response. Lovelock reported such a confusion regarding emotional preference since Klein made no distinction between love and friendship.

== Sell Assessment of Sexual Orientation (SASO) ==
The Sell Assessment of Sexual Orientation proposed by Randall L. Sell is an attempt to improve on the Kinsey scale by addressing three main concerns about the latter scale:

1. measuring multiple attributes (sexual attraction, sexual orientation identity and sexual behaviour) separately
2. reporting the extent of sexual attraction, orientation identity and behavior
3. assessing homosexuality and heterosexuality separately

The Sell Assessment of Sexual Orientation is designed to achieve a more detailed account of sexual orientation which may be more suitable to the specific nature of research.

=== Testing method ===
The Sell Assessment contains 6 matching pairs of questions, three evaluating sexual attractions, two evaluating sexual contacts and one evaluating sexual identity. The pairs consist each of one question assessing homosexuality and one question assessing heterosexuality. All of those questions and answers provide a profile of a subject's sexual orientation. To only access certain parts of this profile one of the four sets of summaries of the Sell Assessment may be used.

=== Summaries ===
==== Homosexuality and heterosexuality summary ====
To create a summary of the Sell Assessment the following standardized responses are assigned to each question: “not at all homosexual”, “slightly homosexual”, “moderately homosexual”, “very homosexual”. As a second step, the questions regarding sexual attraction and sexual contact are summarized to one value by taking the highest score from each set of questions. Finally, the summary results in a single measure for sexual attraction, sexual contact and sexual identity regarding homosexuality. The same procedure is then performed to assess the heterosexuality measures.

==== Bisexuality and asexuality summary ====
Taking into account the interactions of the six question pairs assessing homosexuality and heterosexuality, a subject's bisexuality and asexuality can be measured. In the case of bisexuality, subjects are classified as “not at all bisexual”, “slightly bisexual”, “moderately bisexual” or “very bisexual” depending on their answers to each question pair. As explained above, these standardized responses can be summarized to a single measure for sexual attraction, sexual contact and sexual identity. The Asexuality Summary differs from the other three summaries since it is measured dichotomously - a subject can either be “asexual” or “not at all asexual”. A subject is only classified as “asexual” in the domain of sexual attraction if the subject's answers report no sexual attraction in any of the six questions evaluating sexual attraction. The same holds for sexual contact and sexual identity.

=== Reliability and validity ===
Reliability of the Sell Assessment was measured via a test-retest procedure. Two weeks after their first participation, subjects were asked to complete the questionnaire again. The correlation of the results was used as a measure of test reliability. All test-retest correlations were extremely high with values above 0.93 which was the lowest value for the correlation between heterosexual identity in the test and pretest. This strongly indicates the reliability of the Sell Assessment.

Construct validity was assessed by correlating the results of the Kinsey Summary with the results Kinsey-type questions of sexual attraction, sexual contact and sexual identity included in the questionnaire. The Kinsey Summary refers to a classification of the subjects into the 7 categories of the Kinsey scale based on their results in the Sell Assessment. Results show correlations upwards from 0.85 which indicate the construct validity of Sell's scale.

=== Evaluation ===
As shown above, the Sell Assessment addresses all issues reported with regard to the Kinsey Scale: the separate measurement of multiple dimensions of sexual orientation, the integration of different degrees of homosexuality and heterosexuality and the independent measurement of homosexuality and heterosexuality.

The advantages of the Sell Assessment become visible when examining the variability found in the Sell Assessment between subjects with identical Kinsey scores. For example, the portion of subjects classified as “not homosexual” varies across the domains of sexual attraction, sexual contact and sexual identity (37,3% for sexual attraction, 53,1% for sexual contact and 44,6% for sexual identity). Therefore, it provides a more detailed and accurate assessment of sexual orientation compared to the Kinsey Scale. Especially, the Sell Assessment can make distinctions between subjects based on their sexual orientation which cannot be made using the Kinsey Scale.

However, the Sell Assessment was tested on internet users. On the one hand, this opens up the possibility to test subjects from every section of the population. On the other hand, one cannot rely on the subject's sincerity as one could during an interview since the experimenter never gets to know the subjects to form an opinion about their personality. Apart from that, the Sell Assessment remains largely untested and is eventually too complicated for average research studies.

== Multidimensional Scale of Sexuality (MSS) ==
The Multidimensional Scale of Sexuality (MSS) was developed by Berkey et al. in 1990 and motivated by criticism of already-existing and commonly used scales. Criticism was aimed at four basic points:

1. Assumption of sexual orientation being uni-dimensional and bipolar (heterosexual - homosexual) is inaccurate
2. Assumption of sexual orientation being static over the whole lifetime of an individual is inaccurate
3. Bisexuality is not properly accounted for or not included at all
4. Sexual behaviour is not the same as sexual orientation, behaviour alone cannot capture all there is to sexual orientation

The MSS assumes that sexual orientation is multidimensional, including the factors of time, behaviour, cognitive/affective ratings and a broader view on bisexuality.

=== Categories ===
There are nine MSS categories. The complexity of bisexuality is captured using six of these nine categories. The categories are:

1. Heterosexual
2. Heterosexual with some homosexuality
3. Concurrent bisexual
4. Sequential bisexual
5. Homosexual with some heterosexuality
6. Past heterosexual, currently homosexual
7. Past homosexual, currently heterosexual
8. Homosexual
9. Asexual

=== Testing method ===
The test includes the MSS itself and a questionnaire about the subject's background information.

The MSS questionnaire consists of a self description where the subject is asked to select one out of nine possible descriptions/statements which they think describes their sexual orientation best. These descriptions/statements match the nine MSS categories.

For all nine categories, there is one item included regarding sexual behaviour, sexual attraction, arousal to erotic material, emotional factors and sexual dreams and fantasies. All the items (for all nine categories) have to be answered with either “true” or “false”. Answers regarding sexual behaviour from all categories make up the behavioural subscore. The mean of the other four makes up the cognitive/affective subscore.

== Challenges ==
Researchers intending to measure sexual orientation can use different scales and measurements but as stated above, there is no scale which is fully satisfactory. Problems arise because the scales are based on the subject's answers and opinions about themselves, which could be biased. It is difficult to get a sincere answer from all participants.
