= LGBTQ history in Sudan =

Homosexuality in Sudan was criminalised in 1899.

== Nuba tribal society in the 1930s ==
Siegfried Frederick Nadel wrote about the Nuba tribes in the late 1930s.

He noted that among the Otoro, a special transvestitic role existed whereby men dressed and lived as women. Transvestitic homosexuality also existed amongst the Moru, Nyima, and Tira people, and reported marriages of Korongo londo and Mesakin tubele for the bride price of one goat.

In the Korongo and Mesakin tribes, Nadel reported a common reluctance among men to abandon the pleasure of all-male camp life for the fetters of permanent settlement.

Both tribes feel strongly that marriage and sex life are inimical to physical strength. ... Young married men ... will spend four or five nights with their wives in the village and then return for a fortnight or month to the cattle camp.... They would tell you that they "dislike living in the village". I have even met men of forty and fifty who spent most of their nights with the young folk in the cattle camps rather that at home in the village. ... Behind this grudging submission to marital and adult life in general, behind the secondary sentiments of fondness of camp life and male company, we discover the primary, and quite open, fear of sex as the destroyer of virility. Not sex in the ephemeral, physical sense - the adolescent incontinence of these tribes precludes this - but sex transformed into a permanent fetter, spiritual (as love) and social (as marriage). We will not probe the psychological depth of this antagonism. Let me only point out two things: first, that it occurs in a matrilineal society, that is, a society in which the fruits of procreation are not the man's. And, secondly, that it is accompanied, not only on the strong emphasis on male companionship, but also, in the domain of the abnormal, by widespread homosexuality and transvesticism.
