= LGBTQ history in Kenya =

LGBT history in Kenya has been characterized by religious and colonial influences. Interactions with traders along the Indian Oceanic coastline introduced Islamic religious doctrine against homosexuality. European explorers and British colonial rule incorporated the influence of Christianity. After gaining independence in 1963, the Kenyan government has remained hostile to the LGBT community. But in the 21st century, LGBT organizations advocacy organizations have formed.

== Pre-independence ==
In the centuries after the advent of Islam in the 7th century in Arabia, religious doctrines against homosexuality were likely trafficked by Arab and Persian traders the Indian oceanic coastline, and later the Omani and Portuguese settlers along the coastline up until the 19th century. With the arrival of European missionaries and explorers into the interior in the mid-19th century, the anti-homosexual doctrine of Christianity began to be disseminated among the various ethnic groups in the region.

Moreover, during the colonial rule of British East Africa by the British from 1895 to 1963, anti-sodomy laws were promulgated, a phenomenon encouraged by European Christian missionaries who expanded popular adherence to Christian religion in the colony.

== Post-independence era (1963–2000) ==
The anti-sodomy laws were kept by the post-independence government under Jomo Kenyatta, who, according to Wanjira Kiama:

[...]once claimed that there is no African word for homosexuality. This proves, he argues, that homosexuality is foreign and totally unAfrican. According to President Moi, "Kenya has no room or time for homosexuals and lesbians. Homosexuality is against African norms and traditions, and even in religion it is considered a great sin". Kenyatta’s and Moi’s opinions reflect a disapproval of men who have sex with men that runs broad and deep in Kenyan society.

This hostility continued under the presidency of Daniel arap Moi, even as HIV/AIDS took a heavy toll on the Kenyan population, across sexual orientation boundaries.

== Kibaki and after ==
Under President Mwai Kibaki, in the midst of a rise of hostile anti-LGBT rhetoric, a number of pro-LGBT organizations were established, with the largest group being the Gay and Lesbian Coalition of Kenya in 2006.

On 26 June 2012, the United States embassy in Nairobi held what was believed to be the first ever LGBT pride event in Kenya. A public affairs officer at the embassy said, "The U.S. government for its part has made it clear that the advancement of human rights for LGBT people is central to our human rights policies around the world and to the realization of our foreign policy goals". Similar events were held at other U.S. embassies around the world.

== See also ==
- LGBT rights in Africa
