= Assemblies of the Lord Jesus Christ =

Christian denomination formed in 1952

- Abbreviation: ALJC
- Classification: Western Christian
- Orientation: Pentecostal
- Theology: Oneness Pentecostalism
- General Superintendent: Kenneth Carpenter
- Origin: 1952; 74 years ago
- Merger of: Assemblies of Jesus Christ, Church of the Lord Jesus Christ, and Jesus Only Church of God
- Congregations: 400
- Ministers: 1,500
- Missionaries: 20
- Publications: Apostolic Witness
- Official website: aljc.org

The Assemblies of the Lord Jesus Christ (ALJC) is a Oneness Pentecostal Christian denomination formed in 1952 by the merger of the Assemblies of the Church of Jesus Christ, the Jesus Only Apostolic Church of God, and the Church of the Lord Jesus Christ.

== Statistics ==
The Assemblies of the Lord Jesus Christ claims approximately 420 churches in North America with over 1500 licensed ministers. Internationally, the organization claims to support 20 missionaries who are overseeing works in 17 different nations and regions, as well as numerous indigenous organizations which are affiliated with the ALJC in North America, South America and Africa. The ALJC is primarily centered in Indiana, Ohio, Louisiana, Mississippi, Tennessee, Georgia, North Carolina, and Texas.
