= Shōnen Ai no Bigaku =

Japanese manga magazine

- Issue 17
- Categories: Seinen manga, Adult, Shotacon
- Frequency: Bimonthly
- Publisher: AV Comics
- First issue: June 2003
- Final issue: November 2008
- Company: Shobukan
- Country: Japan
- Language: Japanese

Shōnen Ai no Bigaku (少年愛の美学), literally The Esthetics of Boy Love, was a bimonthly manga compilation authored by shotacon artists in Japan. The title mimics that of a philosophical work on sexuality and homosexuality by Inagaki Taruho. The first volume was published in 2003 by AV Comics, the adult product branch of Shobukan, with the intention of reviving the market for shotacon magazines. Each issue of the seventeen volume series follows a theme such as cross-dressing, omorashi, field trip, or incest.

== Artists ==
Shōnen Ai no Bigaku published a number of recurring manga artists.

- Akio Takami (秋緒たかみ)
- Chiyu 12 Sai (ちゆ12歳)
- Dohi Kensuke (土肥けんすけ)
- Ebi Chiriko (海老知里子)
- Hoshiai Hiro (星逢ひろ)
- Inaba Cozy (稲葉COZY)
- Inumaru (犬丸)
- Kawada Shōgo (かわだ章吾)
- Mitsui Jun (三井純)
- Po-Ju (ぽ～じゅ)
- Sakamoto Hayato (坂本ハヤト)
- Sasorigatame (さそりがため)
- Tsuduki Mayoi (ツヅキ真宵)
- Yamano Kitsune (矢間野狐)
- Yokoyama Chicha (よこやまちちゃ)

== Issues ==
#	Issue Title	Kanji	Date of Publication
1	The Boy in Girl Clothes	The 女装少年	15 June 2003
2	The Mischievous Boy	The やんちゃ少年	15 August 2003
3	The Crybaby Boy	The 泣き虫少年	15 October 2003
4	The Spoiled Boy	The 甘えんぼ少年	15 December 2003
5	The Experienced	The 精通	15 February 2004
6	The Costume Boy	The 制服少年	15 April 2004
7	The Prank Boy	The 悪戯っ子	15 June 2004
8	The Our Summer Vacation	The ぼくらの夏休み	15 August 2004
9	The Our Sports Festival	The ぼくらの運動会	25 October 2004
10	The Morning Erection	The 朝立ち	25 December 2004
11	The Glasses Boy	The メがネ少年	25 February 2005
12	The Little Brother	The 弟	25 April 2005
13	The Wetting Boy	The おもらし少年	25 June 2005
14	The Contest Boy	The くらべっこ	25 August 2005
15	The Boy in Girl Clothes: Underwear Edition	The 女装少年～下着編～	25 October 2005
16	The Our Trip	The ぼくらの遠足	25 December 2005
17	The Naughty Boy	The わんぱく少年	25 February 2006
EX	Boy in Girl Clothes	女装少年	27 May 2008
EX2	Phimosis	包茎	27 November 2008

== See also ==
- Shotacon
