= Sexuality in Somalia =

Literature on sexuality in Somalia has various focuses, from courtship, the motives behind FGM, extended singleness, marriage and the relationship between the sexes. It usually has a heterosexual focus, and norms surrounding sexuality can differ between each national depending on levels of religiosity, conservatism, location, as well as other factors, although a common Somali culture exists.

== Committal ==
=== Calmasho ===
Calmasho is a more serious form of courtship and typically involves a view towards marriage. The calmasho process may place a greater level of encumbrance upon the male than the female due to the meher stipulation whereby money is exchanged from man to woman, whereby the woman can set any price; or for introverted men, the doonasho, soo doonis or geedh fadhiisi process, whereby a man is required to inquire about his courtee to her male relative, usually her father. A common tradition is for a senior elder from the groom's side to act on behalf of the groom. Once an agreement exists, another occasion is set for this to be formalised during the nikah procession, wherein instead a "male guardian" or imam enacts the giving away of the bride. This is often followed by a process called sooriyo wherein cash is placed within a keffiyeh and then split in half to be shared among the bride and grooms elders (or other family). If the groom confirms his commitment, then the "male guardian" or imam confirms the marriage and the attendees are informed by the following mashxarad (ululation) that is enacted by the women, which is followed by congratulating. The final ceremony involves the aroos (wedding), which depending on the specific community, may occur during a later time of the day.

== Terminology ==
More liberal or non-religious Somalis may use terms such as "isku biir" or "isku biirasho", which mean "to connect" or "making connections" respectively. Such terminology is intentionally unpretentious and is used in order to reduce pressure and provide for a less formal atmosphere, as the terms aren't necessarily romance-oriented, and as such leave options open for a platonic, transcendent, vocational, or intellectual relationship. More religious Somalis may inculcate religious terminology, such as hunna libaasullakum (Q2:187), or the Somalized equivalent weydaarsiga dharka, both roughly meaning exchanging clothes, which is Islamic terminology to describe forming an attachment to a spouse. There are many terms for a pair of spouses, including labada isqaba, afoyaal, or saygayaasha. A more flirty term of endearment is gacaliso meaning my beloved. Those who view the Somali dating process as impersonal may refer to it as shucuur la'aan, roughly meaning stoic or unsentimental.

An in-law is referred to as dumaashi, soddog or in second person, soddog-aydi (my in-law'). During a divorce, the utterance of furitaan (divorce) is uttered thrice.

Platonic terms of endearment used between male and female associates may include words such as wehel (friend), jaale (comrade), jaar (neighbour) or lammaane (partner). A term of endearment between confidants includes huuno meaning dear. The term for marriage in Somali is guur, which also means to travel. This is in reference to the traditional associated marital practise of aqal gal (literally room entrance), which in practise meant the couple moved into a house. However, some religiously observant Somalis may substitute for terms that eschew materialism and favor forbearing ordinances such as "marry the unmarried among you ... If they should be poor, Allah will enrich them from His bounty" (Q24:32), however, parents often insist on financial stability from male suitors.

A derogatory term for a person (usually a woman) who ostensibly has no prospects for marriage or is past the typical marrying age is guumeeys which in another sense means owl, and roughly translates to English as spinster or femcel. In the South West dialects, the words zawaj or aroos are used to describe a marriage.

== Tradition ==
There are various Somali-specific cultural practises which have varying degrees of currency among Somalis. These include masaafo, which is the Somali term for elopement. Masaafo is carried out for two very different reasons; the first may be in order for a woman to avoid an arranged marriage, a practise which some religious leaders have referred to as "religious syncretism" or "bid'ah" (religious innovation). The other motive for masaafo is that it is, by its nature, spontaneous, and as such exacerbates romanticism. Another Somali cultural practise pertaining to courtship is heerin, whereby a single woman enters a random village whereupon she informs a local about her lovelornness; thereby this local is required to gather male eligible bachelors in the village whereupon she chooses her spouse on the spot on the same day. The colonial era scholar and administrator stated that Somali males are nonsentimental creatures, stating:

The Somali is not a sentimental creature and has not much more regard for a woman, once safely married to her, than he has for his camel.

The most common marital practises among Somalis which are universal among both southern maamuls (provinces) i.e. konfuur galbeed or Jubaland, or northern such as Puntland, include the following four stipulations: (a) markhaati (witnesses, usually relatives), (b) hadiyad (a gift), (c) ogolaanshada (consent), (d) warfaafin waqaf ah (public declaration).

=== Baatilnimo ===
Baatilnimo is derivative of the Arabic word Baatil, used by some Somalis to describe controversial, or religiously void and incorrect practises. One such controversial practise is xeedho-fur, a custom which is more common in the north which includes xeedho-fur, a type of container (usually containing odkac) roped in an awkward manner which is then unroped by the groom's relative. Due to the more adversarial nature of some participants, especially when the groom's family fails to unrope, xeedho-fur can be seen as controversial or backwards. The most controversial Somali cultural practice pertaining to romantic coaxing is arguably dhabargaraac, a bridenapping practise which is similar to Ala kachuu in Kyrgyzstan.

== Views ==
=== Haasaawe ===
The terms shukaansi and haasaawe have overlapping meanings, and both refer to the initial courtship process. When haasaawe does not have a serious or committed end-goal in mind, it is sometimes viewed among Somalis as promiscuous, and as such, may not be done openly. However, the Hantiwadaag (socialist) period of Somali history, from 1969 until 1991, had a more lax attitude towards dating, as the government had an averse perception of an overtly strenuous form of religiosity. Nonetheless, since the formation of various regional states, especially when at the helm of a comparatively progressive regional president, there has been an increasing predilection towards freemixing, which may be seen in city centers.

=== Faasiqnimo ===
The term faasiqnimo is the uncountable noun form of the agent noun faasiq, which describes a corrupt or impious person, or a venial sinner. Each era has seen incremental changes in the Somali view of sexuality, from the pre-modern until well into the post-independence era wherein cross-clan relationships were encouraged to nurture tribal bond. In the contemporary era, the charge of faasiqnimo is sometimes levelled at those engaging in qabyaalad, i.e. mahrams refusing to officiate or arrange a marriage due to being from different clans or regional states. The rejections faced by suitors have at times led to an increase in tensions, friction, antagonism and distrust between Somali clans. Besides clan frictions, such additional dating criteria and expansions of requirements for eligibility have been blamed for an increase in late marriages or life-long celibacy among Somalis, due to the narrowing of the dating pool.

=== Makrux and xeer ===
Makrux or makruh is a word used by some Somalis to describe an act whose legal or religious ruling is uncertain, but is nonetheless taboo, disapproved or detestable. Xeer on the other hand describes the traditional legal system of Somalia. Since xeer can be based on arbitrary traditional views some of which may date back to pre-Islamic proto-Somali systems such as Waaqism, ambivalent circumstances can often create friction between the two schools of thought. However, the subsequent collapse of legal services in the midst of the collapse of the Hantiwadaag government in 1991 made many in the country default to most prevalent and best-funded legal system at the time, which was the petro-dollar-funded Gulf Arabian form of Islam imported from the Gulf States, as xeer the traditional Somali system wasn't as prominent, nor was it funded. At least until the formation of the federal government, this resulted in a more conservative exterior outlook.

=== Ahlul hawa ===
The predominant religious strand in Somalia is Sunnism, which, in many local paradigms or standards, is practised with the Shafi'i madhab. However, many other denominations are practised too, including Ibadism, Shi'ism, Sufism, Salafism/Zahirism, non-denominational Islam, as well as a proportion of non-practising cultural Muslims. There is also a very small proportion of Somali Christians, Somali Waaqists and Somali deists. Nonetheless, there is a prevailing current in Somali society against promiscuity, due to both religious mores and due to the fact that offspring that may occur from such convenances leaves populations outside the Somali clan framework. The Islamic terminology that is sometimes inculcated into Somali society to defer such sentiments include ahlul-hawa, which literally means people of base desires, and usually implies a conceited combination of being both hedonistic and nihilistic. A religious trope deriving from 4802 of Al-Bukhaari which has permeated into Somali culture outlines four particularly desirable traits to seek in a partner, consisting of (a) wealth status, (b) kinship status, (c) degree of attractiveness or unattractiveness, (d) levels of religiosity; although the actual hadith prioritizes the last trait.

Some Islamists have used the proclivity among Somalis against the ahlul-hawa archetype or benchmark to push for a puritanical form of Islamism in rural parts of the country. In rural areas of parts of South West State of Somalia, there has been activity by the group called al-Shabaab. Its predecessors have existed since the 1990s, however al-Shabaab itself has operated in the naughts decade and the 2010s. During its peak, it publicly carried out stonings of those in extramarital relationships.
