= LGBTQ topics in Chile =

LGBTQ topics in Chile include:

- LGBTQ people in Chile
- LGBTQ rights in Chile
- LGBT history in Chile
- Chilean LGBT+ cinema
- Same-sex marriage in Chile
- Intersex rights in Chile
