= LGBTQ culture in Chengdu =

There is an active LGBTQ community in Chengdu, Sichuan, China.

Chengdu is one of the most economically developed cities in China. Located in the southwest of China, Chengdu is far away from the capital Beijing and its regulatory sighting. In order to boost the economy, consumerism has given rise to many entertainment venues in Chengdu. There are many different subcultures and lifestyles, providing LGBTQ people with more opportunities to meet like-minded friends and partners. Chengdu has both lesbian and gay male clubs and it has a higher percentage of self-identified LGBTQ people than some of the country's more populous cities. There are over 30 gay bars in Chengdu. LGBTQ groups socialize and keep their community together in those spots.

Some millennials, as of 2017, used the name "Gaydu" to refer to Chengdu. It is sometimes referred to as the "gay capital" of China.

== Background ==
In China, traditional culture values surround continuing the family line and carrying on the family name. Chinese adults have the responsibility and carry the expectations from the elders to get married and have offspring in their 20's and 30's.

LGBTQ populations have been discriminated against in China in different ways. LGBT-related programs are censored by the State Administration of Press, Publication, Radio, Film and Television of China, sorting them as inappropriate contents. Although homosexuality and bisexuality were removed from mental disorders in China in 2000, there are still large numbers of people who view them as mental health problems and need to be treated. In sexual orientation conversion efforts (SOCE), electroshock therapy are believed to be treatments of correcting one's sexual orientation.

As the new generation is more liberal-minded, society is slowly getting better at accepting LGBTQ communities.

== Events ==
In 2010, the wedding of Zheng Anquan and Pan Wenjie was held in Chengdu. It was the first same-sex wedding ceremony that was widely reported in China, though same-sex marriages are not legally recognised in the country.

In 2016, the first lesbian open wedding ceremony took place in Chengdu and drew great attention in the country. Besides reports and articles, there were 150,000 people who watched live and a related short film that reached over 5 million viewers in China. The couple, Michelle Zhang and Pat Tietgens, met in a lesbian bar named Moonflower in Chengdu.

In 2016, LGBTQ advocacy groups argued that Chengdu had the same level of LGBTQ tolerance seen in Beijing and Shanghai.

In 2020, the authorities forced a nightclub called MC Club to close after photographs of events with sexual undertones surfaced. Local media linked HIV infection risks with the closure of the club.

In 2021, in light of the Chinese Communist Party (CCP) putting restrictions on activities by LGBTQ groups, an activist with Chengdu Rainbow (a non-governmental organization) stated that LGBTQ people in the city focus on minor steps rather than large steps, and that "There is some tacit acceptance by the authorities, but it is very delicate".

== LGBTQ culture in Chengdu teahouses ==
Going to teahouses is an important culture in the city of Chengdu. It is the most common local social venue in Chengdu and frequently visited by local residents. Regardless of people's economic status, drinking tea in a teahouse is a popular way of leisure for all classes of local people. People enjoy freedom inside the teahouse with little interference.

LGBTQ people in Chengdu build connections and develop their social relations in teahouses, and also to provide a convenient channel for newcomers to integrate into the local circle.

LGBTQ people in Chengdu teahouses have three particularly salient features. First, they appear in public without hiding themselves. They appear in groups and in the open space in front of the rest of the people. In this scene, expressions of homosexuality were overt rather than "underground". The formation of public space and the construction of LGBTQ identity were closely tied to this local custom. Second, LGBTQ people are integrated with society at large in teahouses. Surrounded by other teahouse visitors, LGBTQ people are very open about their identity. Third, many interviewees believe that Chengdu's local culture is particularly tolerant of homosexuality, which is an important reason for the formation of a gay public space where the general public and LGBTQ coexist in harmony, represented by teahouses. Local culture also plays a significant role in the formation of gay public space. The local custom of drinking tea in Chengdu and the relatively free atmosphere of the teahouses allow LGBTQ people to be able to live together in the public space and have their characters to be openly expressed.

== Bars and clubs ==
LGBTQ bars and nightclubs in Chengdu include MAX bar, Hunk Sky, Moonflower, and AMO.
