= LGBTQ themes in African diasporic mythologies =

LGBTQ themes have been found in different African diasporic mythologies, primarily evidenced in mythologies from Vodoun (Vodou, Vudu, Voodoo), Santeria, and Candomblé.

== Haitian Vodoun and Louisiana Voodoo ==
A large number of spirits or deities exist in Haitian and Louisiana Voodoo called lwa. These lwa may be regarded as families of individuals or as a singular entity with distinct aspects, with links to particular areas of life.

Some lwa have particular links with magic, ancestor worship, or death, such as the Gede and Bawon. A number of these are further particularly associated with gender non-conformity or same-sex interactions. These include Ghede Nibo, a spirit caring for those who die young. He is sometimes depicted as an effeminate drag queen and inspires those he inhabits to lascivious sexuality of all kinds, especially gender non-conforming or lesbian behaviour in women. Gede Nibo's parents are Baron Samedi and Maman Brigitte; Baron Samedi is the leader of the Gede and Barons and is depicted as a bisexual dandy or occasionally as transgender, wearing a top hat and frock coat along with women's skirts and shoes. Samedi has a tendency toward "lascivious movements" that cross gender boundaries and also imply a lust for anal sex.

Other barons displaying gay behaviour are Baron Lundy and Baron Limba, who are lovers and teach a type of homoerotic nude wrestling at their school, believed to increase magical potency. Baron Oua Oua, who often manifests with a childlike aspect, has been called the baron "most closely linked to homosexuality" by Vodou practitioners.

Another lwa, Erzulie, is associated with love, sensuality and beauty. Erzulie can manifest aspects that are LGBT-related, including transgender or amazonian traits, in addition to traditionally feminine guises. When inhabiting men, these aspects can result in gender non-conforming or homoerotic behaviour, whereas they may result in lesbianism or anti-male sentiment in women. Erzulie Freda is seen as the protector of gay men, and Erzulie Dantor is associated with lesbians.

== LGBTQ+ themes in Santería and Candomblé ==
Santería and Candomblé are syncretic religions derived from Yoruba diasporic beliefs and Catholicism, most prevalent in South Americas, including Cuba and Brazil. Their mythologies have many similarities to that of Yoruba, and contain a pantheon of Orishas (spirits), comparable to (and often identified with) the loa of Voodoo. During the Atlantic Slave Trade, Roman Catholicism was the main religion emphasized by Spanish rule. This power imbalance and criminalization of African religious practices in the Americas led to the syncretization of Yoruba deities and Catholic saints. The pair most commonly referenced is the Orisha of Thunder Shango (Chango) and Santa Barbara due to their similar color scheme, the presence of cups in Santa Barbara, along with the sword she carries, and most notably, their warrior personalities or associations. Shango is often characterized by his hypermasculinity, seen through his strength and flirtatiousness (and also his three wives), while Santa Barbara, as a female deity, incites a cross-gender portrayal of their syncretic relationship.

=== Gender diversity In Santeria ===
==== Logun Ede ====
Folklorist Ysamur Pena has documented the myth of Logun Ede as an example of queerness within Santeria myth. Pena's article, published in the Western Folklore Journal, explains that Logun Ede was the child of Ochún and Ochosi and was said to have all of the traits of their parents. Ochosi and Ochún wished to hide Logun Ede due to the many traits they possessed. Meaning that for six months out of the year, Logun Ede was a beautiful woman who lived with their mother, Ochún, and for the other six months Logun Ede was a handsome man who lived with their father Ochosi. The story narrates how a man named Orumila, an Ifa practitioner, met a beautiful woman at the beach and wed her. Six months later, she disappeared, while searching for her, Orumila met a strong warrior whom he convinced to join Ifa divination. During initiation, Logun Ede's identity became public, which embarrassed Orumila, who consequently forbade the initiation of those without a “clear and defined gender.”

This myth provides evidence of gender representation beyond binaries in Santeria. Anthropologist Andrea Allen has argued that Logun Ede's myth has been representative of gender diversity in Santeria mythology. Though Logun Ede's myth is relatively less popular compared to other myths in Santeria, some practitioners find it queer-affirming, while other practitioners have used it to exclude the incorporation of queer practitioners into Santeria.

==== Inle and Abata ====
Inle (also known as Erinle) and Abata (Abbata) are the sons of Yemaha (Yemoja, Yemaya). Inle is a divine hunter, fisher, and healer god who is also referred to as the patron of homosexuals.Inle is most commonly characterized by their androgyny and fluidity. Folkorist Solimar Otero writes that Inle's gender fluidity increases their fishing/hunting and healing abilities due to their ability to connect to others. There are also stories that cite Inle's close relationship with Abata (Orisha of marshes and swamps), another semi-androgynous orisha. In one story, Yemaha took away Inle's ability to speak by cutting out their tongue so that they could not share Yemaya's secrets. In different versions of the story, the catalyst for Inle's cut out tongue fluctuates from Yemaha being tricked into incestuous sex with her son Shango to Yemaha's love for Inle leading her to rape them, cutting their tongue to stop them from speaking of it. In another story, Abata was a lover of Yemaha, and Yemaha took away Abata's ability to hear so that he could not hear those asking for her secrets. In both stories (and their fluctuating versions) Inle and Abata were cast out into the bottom of the ocean by Yemaha, as a result of their isolation and loneliness, Inle and Abata become passionate friends and then lovers, able to communicate emphatically. This pataki is used to explain the origin of incest, muteness, and deafness in addition to homosexuality.

== See also ==
- LGBTQ themes in mythology
- LGBTQ topics and Afro-Americans in the Americas
- Queer theology
- Religion and homosexuality
- Religion and transgenderism
