= LGBTQ themes in Chinese mythology =

Chinese mythology has been described as "rich in stories about homosexuality", reflecting ancient Chinese perspectives toward variance in sexuality and gender, rather than modern views. Chinese myths and traditional folk tales are greatly influenced by religious beliefs, particularly Taoist, Confucian, and Buddhist teachings.

Myths include instances of changing gender and sexual activity between members of the same sex, or between humans and supernatural creatures that assume a form of the same sex.

== Sexuality in Chinese myths ==
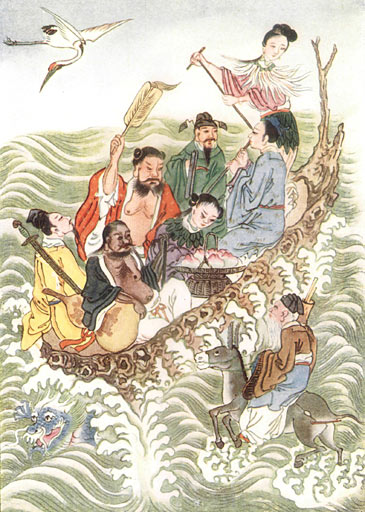
"The Eight Immortals Crossing the Sea", from Myths and Legends of China, 1922, E.T.C. Werner

Homosexuality in Chinese myths or folk tales may involve explicit physical contact, but may also be represented by more "profound emotions and feelings", making it difficult to unambiguously differentiate a homoerotic relationship from other social relationships, such as a friendship or rivalry. Sexual activity in Chinese myth is often described metaphorically, for example, in military terms. This leads some readers to interpret scenes of combat figuratively, as sexual metaphors. Popular folk stories are generally more explicit about same-sex romantic encounters than later literary re-tellings. Male and female homosexuality were considered to be unrelated in ancient China, and there are very few descriptions of lesbianism in traditional Chinese texts.

The pre-Taoist, pre-Confucian tradition of China was predominantly shamanistic, with the majority of shamans being female. Male same-sex love was believed to have originated in the mythical south, thus homosexuality is sometimes still called "Southern wind". From this period, numerous spirits or deities were associated with homosexuality, bisexuality and transness. These include Chou Wang, Lan Caihe – one of the Eight Immortals, Shan Gu, and Yu the Great, and Gun.

Religious Taoism is generally considered to be polytheistic. Its many deities, although unified by the idea and practice of Tao, are often pictured as part of a heavenly hierarchy that mirrors the bureaucracy of Imperial China. According to the beliefs of Religious Taoism, Chinese deities may be promoted or demoted for their actions. Some deities are also simply exalted humans, such as Guan Yu, the god of honor and piety. The particular deities worshipped vary according to geographical regions and historical periods in China, though the general pattern of worship is more constant.

Sexual abstinence is seen as virtuous if it results from self-denial, allowing greater attention to spiritual or heroic matters. This is not the case if abstinence is the result of castration. Eunuchs in Chinese myths are usually portrayed as "greedy, temperamental and cowardly", with a similar lack of self-discipline as women.

== Mythical lands ==
Women's Kingdom (or Women's Country) is a country situated in Southern Tibet or on an isolated Island. The island is believed to be inaccessible to normal travel due to its being surrounded by water of less-than-usual density, causing ships to sink. Occasional travellers have found themselves transported to the island by whirlwinds and reported that it is inhabited solely by women. These women have a fully functional community without men, and the only relationships are therefore between women. These women reproduce themselves by sleeping outdoors, where they become pregnant through the action of the southern wind blowing across their bodies, or by bathing in pools of water. Any male babies that are born die before the age of three.

Another Women's Kingdom exists in folklore. This is a mythical land, in which men and women have their social roles reversed. Men are called women, and run the household while wearing traditional women's clothes. Conversely, women dress in men's boots and hats and are in charge of public affairs. The folk belief in this Women's Kingdom is best known from the eighteenth-century novel Romance of the Flowers in the Mirror.

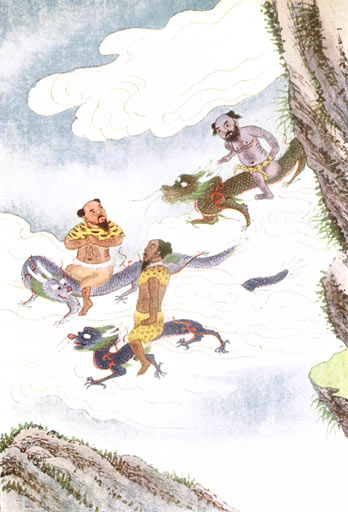
Dragon-gods, from Myths and Legends of China, 1922 by E. T. C. Werner. Dragons sometimes sexually assaulted older men.

== Supernatural encounters ==
Homosexual encounters are common in Chinese folk stories. The Xian (animal spirits or fairies) often choose same-sex partners, usually young men or boys. Some stories show Xian asking the Lord of the Fairies permission to stay with their male lovers for some time, which could be as long as years, due to time's passing differently in the fairy realm. If the Lord of the Fairies remembers, he may cut the relationship short, hence such relationships are often brief, with melancholic endings as the human participant is abandoned. A Xian-human relationship is seen in the tale of "The Scholar and the Flower Spirit".

One exception to the age preference for younger men is shown by the dragon, a powerful mythological beast, and a phallic symbol of male potency. According to Xiaomingxiong, Chinese dragons "consistently enjoy sexual relationships with older men", one example being in the tale of "Old Farmer and a Dragon", in which a sixty-year-old farmer is forcibly sodomised by a passing dragon, resulting in wounds from penetration and bites that require medical attention.

Other stories that feature homoerotic interactions or transgender figures include "The Farmer and the Pig" and "Fox Fairy and a Scholar".

== Legendary figures and deities ==
Guan Yu, the deified military leader, is described in legend as "unmoved by beautiful women". This has been read as denoting asexuality by most commentators, rather than a homosexual subtext, but in folklore his relationships with his (not blood-related) brothers are assumed to have a homoerotic component.

Although the literature of some taoist schools included homosexuality as one of the forms of sexual misconduct, Tu Er Shen is a deity in Chinese folklore who is popularly said to manage the love and sex between homosexual men. His name literally means "rabbit deity". According to "The Tale of the Rabbit God" in the Zi Bu Yu, Tu Er Shen was originally a man called Hu Tianbao, who fell in love with a handsome young imperial inspector of the Fujian Province. One day Hu Tianbao was caught peeping on the inspector, at which point he confessed his reluctant affections for the other man. The imperial inspector had Hu Tianbao sentenced to death by beating. Since his crime was one of love, underworld officials decided to right the injustice by delegating Hu Tianbao as the god and safeguarder of homosexual affections. In order to cater to the needs of modern homosexuals, worship of the Rabbit God has been resuscitated in Taiwan: a temple was founded in Yonghe City by a gay Taoist priest.

== See also ==
- LGBT themes in mythology
- LGBT themes in speculative fiction
- LGBT literature
- LGBT history
- Transgender people in China
- Homosexuality in China
- Religion and homosexuality
- Religion and transgenderism
