= Homosexuality in Australian rules football =

While many sports have historically had homophobia run deep within them at many levels, Australian rules football has been a particular point of scrutiny by LGBT advocates. Despite the Australian Football League (AFL) running over more than a century of elite competition, and at least 16,885 players in the VFL and AFL, there is only one retired player to publicly identify as bisexual, former West Coast Eagles player Mitch Brown, and only one current or retired player has publicly identified as gay, although multiple players at an amateur level or semi-professional level have come out.

In March 2026, former Brisbane Lions player Leigh Ryswyk announced during an interview on radio station Joy 94.9 that he was gay, becoming the first AFL player to come out publicly. Many players in AFLW have come out as gay or bisexual.

Players at non-professional level have come out, including Jason Ball, and he launched a campaign to tackle homophobia in Australian rules football. However, the first player to come out to the public was a man named Matt Hall, who contracted HIV in 1996 and was banned from the Victorian Amateur Football Association due to his diagnosis. Hall came out in 2002 and actively worked to fight the stigma until his sudden death in 2023.

Prior to any gay or bisexual professional players coming out, former AFL coach and premiership player Danielle Laidley (formerly known as Dean Laidley) was outed without her permission by a police officer in May 2020 for being transgender; the police officer in question was stood down.

Besides members of the LGBT community, controversy has arisen as former players such as Jason Akermanis controversially advised in a 2006 article that gay and bisexual players should keep their sexual orientation secret, which ended his career at the Brisbane Lions; he doubled down on this stance in 2023.

In more recent times, the AFL has taken a strong stance against homophobia, including publicly supporting the Yes vote for marriage equality, including temporarily changing its logo to "YES" in support. The survey was ultimately successful in overturning Australia's marriage laws, with more than 61% of respondents voting in the affirmative.

The AFL took a particularly strong stance against homophobic slurs in the 2024 AFL season, handing out significant suspensions to players who have used such language. Gold Coast Suns defender Wil Powell was suspended for five games after making a homophobic slur against a Brisbane player in round eight. This came just a month after Port Adelaide's Jeremy Finlayson received a three game ban for a similar incident against Essendon. The AFL escalated the penalty for Powell to send a clear message that homophobic language will not be tolerated, with general counsel Stephen Meade stating: "homophobia has no place in our game, nor in society."

Melbourne captain Max Gawn called it "embarrassing to call yourself an AFL player" in 2024 after multiple incidents in the year, supporting the league's tough stance. The AFL Players Association, however, criticised what it sees as inconsistent sanctions and called for a review of the process. Earlier in the 2024 season, North Melbourne coach Alastair Clarkson was fined $20,000 for an alleged homophobic comment towards two St Kilda players. The incidents have highlighted the AFL's efforts to create a welcoming environment for the LGBT community. Clubs have condemned the language and vowed to provide education to players.

On 16 August 2025, during the Crows' victory over Collingwood in round 23, Rankine purportedly used a homophobic slur against a Collingwood player. The incident prompted an investigation and for him to be suspended by the AFL, possibly for the rest of the season (including the finals) despite opposition to such a harsh punishment from the Crows. While Rankine said he is remorseful for his actions, the incident sparked a broader discussion about homophobia and toxic masculinity in the sport.

Less than two weeks later, former West Coast Eagles player Mitch Brown came out as bisexual, becoming the AFL's first openly bisexual past or present player in the AFL's 129-year history. Before his coming out, the AFL was the only major professional men's sport league worldwide to have never had an openly bisexual or gay past or present player.

Isaac Quaynor, who was the victim of the previous homophobic slur was booed three weeks later when Collingwood went up against Adelaide.

== See also ==
- Homosexuality in association football
- Homosexuality in American football
- Homosexuality in modern sports
