= LGBTQ rights in Vermont =

- Vermont (US)
- Legal status: Legal since 1977
- Gender identity: Transgender persons allowed to change gender without surgery
- Discrimination protections: Protections for both sexual orientation and gender identity

Family rights
- Recognition of relationships: Same-sex marriage since 2009
- Adoption: Both joint and stepchild adoption

Vermont is seen as one of the most liberal states in the U.S. in regard to lesbian, gay, bisexual, transgender, and queer (LGBTQ) rights, with most progress in jurisprudence having occurred in the late 20th and the early 21st centuries. Vermont was one of 37 U.S. states, along with the District of Columbia, that issued marriage licenses to same-sex couples prior to the landmark Supreme Court ruling of Obergefell v. Hodges, establishing equal marriage rights for same-sex couples nationwide.

Moreover, discrimination on the basis of sexual orientation and gender identity in employment, housing and public accommodations is prohibited. In terms of criminal justice, the use of conversion therapy on minors is legally banned since 2016 and since 2021 the common-law "gay and/or trans panic defence" was abolished and repealed. Vermont is often regarded as one of the most LGBTQ-friendly states in the country. It was the first state to legally recognize same-sex unions, when it established civil unions for same-sex couples in 2000. Same-sex marriage was legalized in 2009, with opinion polls showing large popular support.

== History and legality of same-sex sexual activity ==
In 1782, a statute was passed recognizing common law crimes including the "buggery" law. In 1861, Vermont reduced the penalty for sodomy from capital punishment to life imprisonment. In the 1899 case of State v. LaForrest, the Vermont Supreme Court unanimously confirmed that the common law statute made sodomy a criminal offense. The court stated that the punishment, whether fines or imprisonment, would be entirely up to the discretion of the trial court.

Vermont never enacted a specific sodomy statute, leaving the penalty and the definition of what constituted the act to the trial court or jury. However, in 1937, the state passed a law forbidding oral sex, reading: [a]ny person participating in the act of copulating the mouth of one person with the sexual organ of another shall be imprisoned in the state prison not less than one year nor more than five years." The law applied to both heterosexual and homosexual activity. In 1943, Vermont enacted a psychopathic offender law, under which those imprisoned for "gross immorality conduct" would remain in prison until they were no longer "considered dangerous to public welfare." The law was repealed in 1968.

The oral sex statute was repealed in April 1977. The common law reception statute technically remains in force, but ruling in Lawrence v. Texas the U.S. Supreme Court held that criminal laws against adult, private, consensual and noncommercial sodomy were unconstitutional and cannot be enforced.

== Recognition of same-sex relationships ==
Same-sex marriage has been legal in Vermont since September 1, 2009. It was the first state in which same-sex marriage became legal through the action of the legislature and governor rather than as a result of a court decision.

In 1999, the Vermont Supreme Court ruled that the state must provide equal marriage benefits to same-sex couples, whether in the form of marriage or an equivalent. As a result, Vermont introduced civil unions in July 2000, the first state to provide a status identical to marriage. Legislators in favor of civil unions received particularly high amounts of "threats, intimidation and vile language", mostly from out-of-state, and especially directed at Governor Howard Dean and openly gay legislator Bill Lippert.

Vermont has provided benefits to same-sex partners of state employees since 1994.

== Adoption and parenting ==
Vermont law permits single LGBT individuals and same-sex couples to petition to adopt. In addition, lesbian couples have access to in vitro fertilization, and state law recognizes the non-genetic, non-gestational mother as a legal parent to a child born via donor insemination, irrespective of the marital status of the parents.

Surrogacy is neither expressly prohibited nor permitted in Vermont. However, courts are generally favorable to surrogacy, which means both the surrogate and the intended parents, including same-sex couples, can pursue a surrogacy arrangement in the state.

In June 1993, the Vermont Supreme Court ruled in favor of a lesbian woman who sought to adopt her partner's two biological sons.

== Discrimination protections ==
Vermont law bans discrimination based on both sexual orientation and gender identity in employment, public accommodations, education, housing, credit, insurance and union practices.

The discrimination protections based on sexual orientation were added in 1992. In 2006, the Vermont General Assembly passed a bill adding gender identity to the state's non-discrimination law, but it was vetoed by Governor Jim Douglas on May 17, 2006. It was passed again in 2007 with a large majority, and was then signed into law by Governor Douglas on May 22, 2007. It took effect on July 1, 2007.

Moreover, the state's anti-bullying law prohibits bullying on the basis of race, color, religion, creed, national origin, marital status, sex, sexual orientation, gender identity and disability. The law also explicitly includes cyberbullying and harassment, and applies to all educational institutions in the state.

== Criminal justice ==
=== Hate crime law ===
Vermont enacted hate crime legislation in 1990, one of the first states to do so, that included sexual orientation. Most of the testimony and statistics that supported its passage related to the gay and lesbian community and one incident of anti-gay violence helped secure its passage. Gender identity was added in 1999. The law provides additional penalties for a crime committed based on the victim's sexual orientation or gender identity, among other categories.

=== Gay or trans panic defense ===
In January 2021, legislation to repeal the gay and trans panic defense was introduced to the Vermont General Assembly with 26 co-sponsors. In March 2021, the Vermont House of Representatives passed the bill by a vote of 144–1. The Vermont Senate unanimously, by 29 votes to 0, passed the bill in April 2021 with some amendments. The amended bill was approved by the House a few days later. On the 5th May, 2021 Governor Phil Scott signed the bill into law - legally effective since July 1.

== Conversion therapy ==
On March 17, 2016, the Vermont Senate unanimously approved a bill banning the use of conversion therapy on LGBT minors. On April 26, the Vermont House of Representatives approved the bill with amendments. The Senate accepted the amended version on April 29. Governor Peter Shumlin signed the bill into law on May 25, and it took effect on July 1, 2016.

== Transgender rights ==
Vermont permits both preoperative and post-operative transgender individuals to change the gender marker on their birth certificates and other state-issued documents. The Vermont Department of Health will issue new documentation upon receipt of a court order. Sufficient evidence for a court order include a letter from a licensed practitioner of medicine or mental health professional that the applicant has undergone "surgical, hormonal, or other treatment appropriate for that individual for the purpose of gender transition". As of 2013, all health insurers that underwrite policies in Vermont are required to cover transgender care, including sex reassignment surgery.

Since July 1, 2018, Vermont has required all single-user public bathrooms to be marked as gender-neutral, after Governor Phil Scott signed a bill to this effect into law in May 2018.

Since July 1, 2019, the Department of Motor Vehicles has offered a third gender option on driver's licences, known as "X". No documentation is needed to update the gender marker on a driver's license or a state ID.

Effective from July 1, 2022, individuals born within Vermont can legally change their sex marker on a birth certificate to "male, female or X" - based on self determination (without any court order, mental health diagnosis, sexual reassignment surgery, divorce and/or even a medical practitioner's permission). The bill passed the Vermont General Assembly and was signed into law by the Governor of Vermont Phil Scott in April 2022.

In May 2023, a bill passed the Vermont Legislature and was signed into law by the Governor of Vermont to legally “protect, defend and shield” transgender and non-binary people (who want access to gender-affirming healthcare across state lines coming into Vermont from interstate) - effective immediately by an emergency clause.

In October 2023, the Vermont department of education unanimously passed a policy to protect and defend students who are transgender and non-binary within schools and classrooms - with very strong robust protections.

=== Sports ===
In 2023 Mid Vermont Christian School's girls' basketball team was assigned to play against a team fielding a player who is a transgender girl. They chose to forfeit the match due to “fairness of the game and the safety of our players.” As a result the Vermont Principals' Association (VPA) forbade them from competition.

== Public opinion ==
A 2017 Public Religion Research Institute poll found that 80% of Vermont residents supported same-sex marriage, while 16% were opposed and 4% were unsure. This was the highest level of support in the United States, tied with Massachusetts.

Public opinion for LGBTQ anti-discrimination laws in Vermont
Poll source	Date(s) administered	Sample size	Margin of error	% support	% opposition	% no opinion
Public Religion Research Institute	January 2-December 30, 2019	135	?	71%	16%	13%
Public Religion Research Institute	January 3-December 30, 2018	179	?	77%	17%	6%
Public Religion Research Institute	April 5-December 23, 2017	212	?	79%	15%	6%
Public Religion Research Institute	April 29, 2015-January 7, 2016	220	?	76%	16%	8%

== Summary table ==
Same-sex sexual activity legal	Yes (Since 1977)
Equal age of consent (16)	Yes (Since 1977)
Anti-discrimination laws for sexual orientation	Yes (Since 1992)
Anti-discrimination laws for gender identity	Yes (Since 2007)
Same-sex marriages	Yes (Since 2009)
Recognition of same-sex couples (e.g. civil union)	Yes (Since 2000; the first US state to do so)
Stepchild and joint adoption by same-sex couples	Yes
Lesbian, gay and bisexual people allowed to serve openly in the military	Yes (Since 2011)
Transgender people allowed to serve openly in the military	(Banned since 2025)
Intersex people allowed to serve openly in the military	(Current DoD policy bans "hermaphrodites" from serving or enlisting in the military)
Right to change legal gender and gender X optional	Yes (From July 2022 no longer requires a court order for changing sex on birth certificates; Gender X available for drivers licences since 2019 and from July 2022 for birth certificates)
Access to IVF for lesbian couples	Yes
Gender-neutral bathrooms	Yes
Conversion therapy banned on minors	Yes (Since 2016)
Gay and/or trans panic defence abolished	Yes (Since 2021)
Intersex minors protected from invasive surgical procedures	No
Surrogacy access for gay male couples	Yes
MSMs allowed to donate blood	Yes (Since 2023, on the condition of being monogamous)

== See also ==
- LGBT rights in the United States
