= Parliamentary League for Considering LGBT Issues =

The League of Diet Members for Considering LGBT Issues (LGBTに関する課題を考える議員連盟, LGBT ni Kana Kadai wo Kangaeru Giin Renmei) is a bipartisan group of Japanese Diet members established on March 17, 2015. Its abbreviation is LGBT Giren (LGBT Giren).

The chairman has been Takeshi Iwaya ( Liberal Democratic Party ) since February 15, 2023.

== History ==
=== Formation ===
During the December 2012 House of Representatives election , the citizens' group Rainbow Pride Ehime conducted a survey of political parties regarding sexual minorities . The Liberal Democratic Party responded that "it is not necessary to address it as a human rights issue," "policies to protect the human rights of sexual minorities are necessary for transsexuals ( among sexual minorities) , but not for homosexuals," and "there is no particular need for a same-sex marriage system." They showed a negative attitude toward LGBT policies, excluding those for transgender people.

In July 2013, it was reported that within the LDP, there was a movement to establish a "Group to Consider Issues Related to Sexual Minorities (provisional name, later to be called the Group to Consider Issues Related to LGBT)" led by Hiroshi Hase, Takeshi Hashimoto, Mineyuki Fukuda, and Karen Makishima.[5] In the same year, Japanese Communist Party member of the House of Representatives Takeshi Miyamoto told LGBT groups, "When people who are considered leftists like us take action on sexual minority make a fuss . " " The Japanese Communist Party will continue to be unwavering in its commitment to protecting sexual minorities, so please make an effort to win over as many LDP members as possible. That's what I want. "

On March 17, 2015, the bipartisan Diet members' league for considering LGBT issues was launched. Hiroshi Hase of the Liberal Democratic Party was elected as its first chairman. The aforementioned Japanese Communist Party member Takeshi Miyamoto also joined the league. The House of Representatives was dissolved on October 14, 2021, and Hase, who had announced his candidacy for the Ishikawa Prefectural Gubernatorial election instead of the House of Representatives election, retired as league chairman on that day. On March 14, 2022, Hase won the conservative split election and was elected.

On February 15, 2023, a general meeting was held in the Diet, and Takeshi Iwaya of the Liberal Democratic Party was elected to the vacant position of chairman. Regarding the 2021 House of Representatives election, Iwaya responded to an NHK survey regarding legal reform to allow same-sex marriage as "somewhat opposed" and to an Asahi Shimbun survey as "undecided". In a Mainichi Shimbun survey asking whether same-sex marriage should be recognized as a legal system, he responded "it should not be recognized. "

=== Legislation and initiatives ===
In May 2021, the League voted to support and develop another anti-discrimination bill following the failure to introduce similar legislation prior to the 2020 Summer Olympics. In 2023, following Japan's assumption of the G7 presidency, the draft by the League was significantly watered down by the LDP-Komeito coalition in consultation with conservative factions, drawing the opposition of pro-LGBT parties and organizations as well as anti-LGBT conservatives. Despite opposition, the revised bill was passed as the LGBT Understanding Promotion Act in June 2023.

On June 11, 2024, following the Supreme Court's decision in favor of granting bereavement benefits to a same-sex widower and deeming same-sex partners as common-law marriages, the League petitioned the cabinet to administratively apply provisions in statute regarding common-law marriages to same-sex couples. In January 2025, Minister Junko Mihara announced that 24 national laws regarding common-law marriages would be applied to same-sex couples, while 131 others would be subject to further review. On October 3, nine further laws regarding common-law marriages were extended to same-sex couples, while excluding 120 others.

== Former members ==
=== Lost re-election ===
- Secretary: Tomohiro Yamamoto (Liberal Democratic Party)
- Secretary: Mineyuki Fukuda (Liberal Democratic Party at the time of establishment, Party of Hope when defeated ) .
- Akira Sato (Liberal Democratic Party)
- Takeshi Hashimoto (Liberal Democratic Party)
- Toru Kunishige (Komeito Party)
- Taiga Ishikawa (Constitutional Democratic Party of Japan)
- Tadashi Shimizu (Japanese Communist Party)
- Kimie Hatano (Japanese Communist Party)
- Saori Ikeuchi (Japanese Communist Party)
- Takeshi Miyamoto (Japanese Communist Party)
- Takeshi Ito (Japanese Communist Party)

=== Retirement ===
- Satsuki Eda (Constitutional Democratic Party)
- Mieko Kamimoto (Constitutional Democratic Party)
- Shiori Yamao ( Democratic Party at the time of joining → Democratic Party for the People at the time of retirement )
- Kota Matsuda ( Japan Revitalization Association )
- Tsuneo Akaeda (Liberal Democratic Party)

=== Resignation from parliament ===
- Akihiro Hatsushika (joined the Democratic Party, then left the Constitutional Democratic Party due to a woman-related issue, and became an independent when he resigned from the Diet )

=== Moving out ===
- First Chairman: Hiroshi Hase (Liberal Democratic Party, from its founding until October 14, 2021)
