= Halpern v Canada (AG) =

2003 Canadian court case

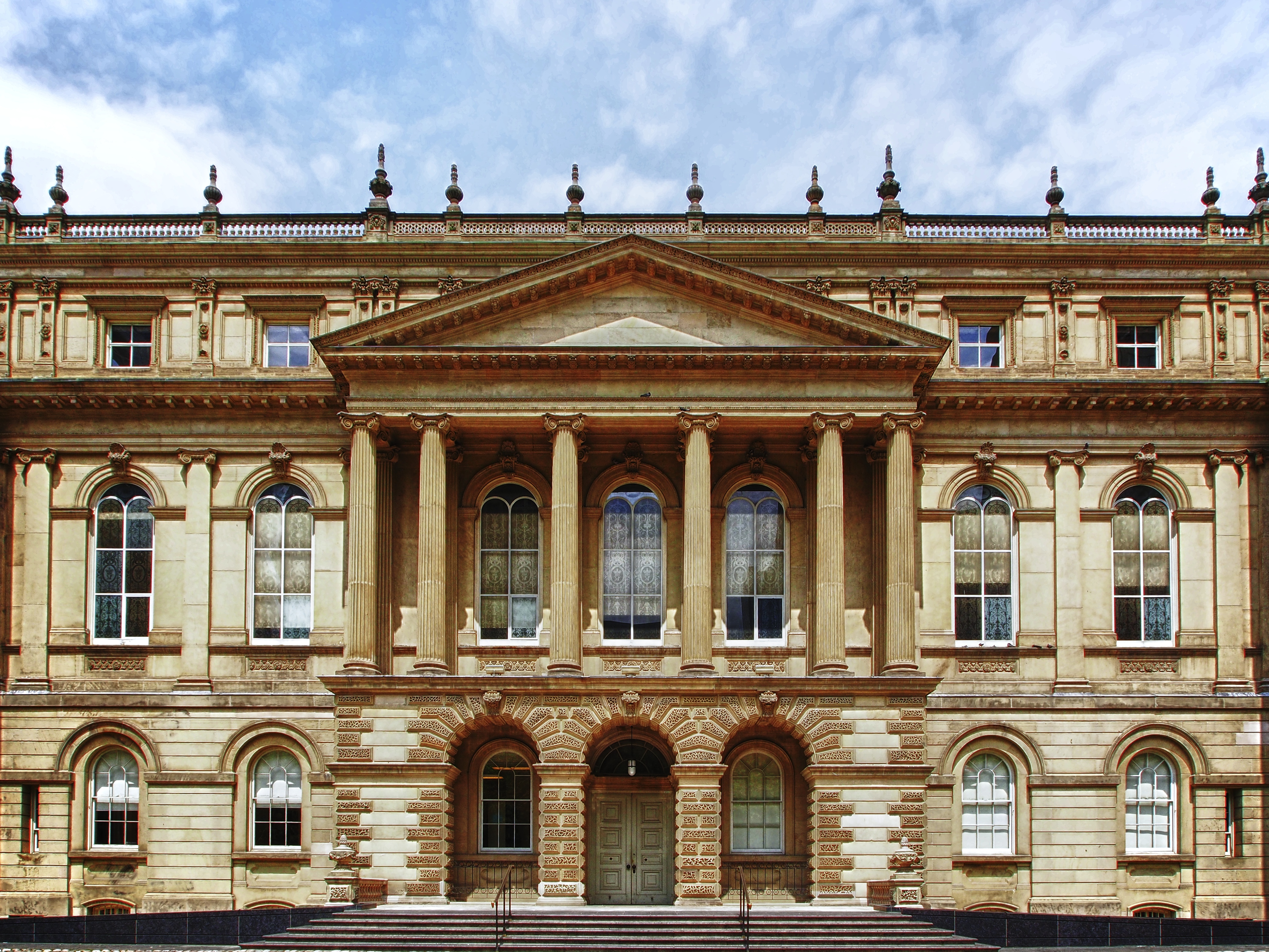
- Court: Court of Appeal for Ontario
- Full case name: Hedy Halpern and Colleen Rogers, Michael Leshner and Michael Stark, Aloysius Pittman and Thomas Allworth, Dawn Onishenko and Julie Erbland, Carolyn Rowe and Carolyn Moffatt, Barbara McDowall and Gail Donnelly, Alison Kemper and Joyce Barnett v Attorney General of Canada, The Attorney General of Ontario, and Novina Wong, The Clerk of the City of Toronto
- Decided: June 10, 2003

Case history
- Appealed from: Ontario Superior Court

Court membership
- Judges sitting: Roy McMurtry C.J.O, James MacPherson, Eileen Gillese JJ.A.

Halpern v Canada (AG), [2003] O.J. No. 2268 is a June 10, 2003 decision of the Court of Appeal for Ontario in which the Court found that the common law definition of marriage, which defined marriage as between one man and one woman, violated section 15 of the Canadian Charter of Rights and Freedoms.

== Background ==
The roots of the case began in December 2000 at the Metropolitan Community Church of Toronto, when pastor Brent Hawkes began issuing banns of marriage in advance of performing wedding ceremonies for two same-sex couples—Kevin Bourassa and Joe Varnell, and Anne and Elaine Vautour—on January 14, 2001. Because banns of marriage are accepted as a fully legal way to perform a marriage without the need for a city-issued marriage license, but marriages performed under either process require certification by the provincial registrar, the banns created a legal vacuum that would force a court case.

Over the course of the year several other same-sex couples, among them Hedy Halpern and Colleen Rogers, and Michael Leshner and Michael Stark, joined the court challenge, which began hearings at the Ontario Superior Court in November 2001.

== Superior Court ruling ==
On July 12, 2002, the Superior Court ruled that marriage rights must be extended to same-sex couples, but it suspended the ruling for a period of two years to permit the Legislative Assembly of Ontario time to comply with the ruling through the legislative process. However, as the Constitution of Canada provides that the definition of marriage is under federal jurisdiction while only the implementation is left to the provinces, the decision left the situation unclear until the government of Jean Chrétien announced on July 29 that they would appeal.

== Court of Appeal ==
The Ontario Court of Appeal handed down its ruling on June 10, 2003.

The unanimous Court found that the exclusion of same-sex couples was a clear violation of the Charter and moreover did not constitute a "reasonable infringement" under section 1. In this respect the judgment followed much of what had been ruled elsewhere.

The court also held that there was to be no suspension of the remedy as it applied to the general population, and that the new definition allowing same-sex couples to marry would take effect immediately.

== Results ==
Leshner and Stark became the first gay couple to be issued a marriage license after the decision, while Bourassa and Varnell and the Vautours became the first legally recognized same-sex marriages overall since their marriages were deemed legal as of the date of the original ceremonies. A few months later, however, Bourassa and Varnell were denied entry to the United States when travelling to attend a human rights conference, because the United States Customs agent refused to accept the validity of their marriage.

In the next two years following the decision, courts in seven of Canada's other nine provinces and one of its three territories also legalized same-sex marriage in their jurisdictions before the Parliament of Canada passed the Civil Marriage Act in 2005.

The Globe and Mail, in choosing the "Nation Builders of the year," selected the judges involved in the case, namely Chief Justice Roy McMurtry, Eileen Gillese and James MacPherson, while the Canadian edition of Time selected Stark and Leshner as its Canadian newsmakers of the year.

== See also ==
- List of notable Canadian Courts of Appeal cases
- Same-sex marriage in Ontario
- Same-sex marriage in Canada
