= Same-sex marriage in Ontario =

Same-sex marriage has been unambiguously legal in Ontario since June 10, 2003. The first legal same-sex marriages performed in Ontario were of Kevin Bourassa to Joe Varnell, and Elaine Vautour to Anne Vautour, by Reverend Brent Hawkes on January 14, 2001. The legality of the marriages was questioned and they were not registered until after June 10, 2003, when the Court of Appeal for Ontario in Halpern v Canada (AG) upheld a lower court ruling which declared that defining marriage in heterosexual-only terms violated the Canadian Charter of Rights and Freedoms.

Ontario was the third jurisdiction in the world, after the Netherlands and Belgium, as well as the first jurisdiction in the Americas to legalize same-sex marriage. The first legal same-sex marriage registered in Ontario was that of Paula Barrero and Blanca Mejias, married at the Emmanuel Howard Park United Church on September 29, 2001 by Reverend Cheri DiNovo. The Office of the Registrar General apparently did not recognize the names as both being women and issued a marriage certificate. All of these marriages were authorized by calling the banns of marriage in the spouses' churches, a procedure which does not require a government-issued licence. The first civil marriage licence issued to a same-sex couple was to Michael Leshner and Michael Stark, who had the usual waiting period waived and completed the formalities of marriage just hours after the court ruling, on June 10, 2003.

== Background ==
In 1993, the Ontario Superior Court ruled in Layland v. Ontario that same-sex couples did not have the capacity to marry each other. However, that decision was non-binding as it was the same court taking up the issue in 2002. One of the judges in the most recent case wrote "with respect, the decisions to which I have referred assumed, without analysis, that the inability of persons of the same sex to marry was a question of capacity. The decisions are not binding on this court and, with respect, I do not find them persuasive."

The Equality Rights Statute Amendment Act, which would have granted same-sex couples a status comparable to civil unions, was proposed by the provincial government in 1994, but was defeated. Premier Bob Rae supported the bill. On 27 October 1999, the Legislative Assembly of Ontario enacted a bill providing same-sex couples with the same statutory rights and responsibilities as opposite-sex common-law spouses under 67 provincial laws, as required by the Supreme Court of Canada's ruling in M v H. It introduced the term "same-sex partner" into various pieces of legislation, and included the right for same-sex couples to adopt children jointly. The law received royal assent by Lieutenant Governor Hilary Weston on October 29.

== Court of Appeal ruling ==
On July 12, 2002, in a 3–0 decision of the Ontario Superior Court, same-sex couples won the right to marry in the case of Halpern v Canada (AG). The court ruled that limiting marriage to opposite-sex couples violated the equality provisions of the Canadian Charter of Rights and Freedoms, giving the Government of Canada a two-year stay of judgment in which to pass legislation implementing same-sex marriage; otherwise, same-sex marriage would come into force automatically. Justice Harry LaForme wrote, "The restriction against same-sex marriage is an offence to the dignity of lesbians and gays because it limits the range of relationship options available to them. The result is they are denied the autonomy to choose whether they wish to marry. This in turn conveys the ominous message that they are unworthy of marriage....I find that there is no merit to the argument that the rights and interests of heterosexuals would be affected by granting same-sex couples the freedom to marry. I cannot conclude that freedom of religion would be threatened or jeopardized by legally sanctioning same-sex marriage." Premier Ernie Eves, a member of the Progressive Conservative Party of Ontario, said on 16 July 2002 that "Ontario won't stand in their way...If two people decide that they want to be in a union why would I interfere with that; that's my personal point of view." The Toronto City Council also passed a measure urging the government not to appeal the decision.

In 2003, the couples in Halpern appealed the decision, requesting that the decision take effect immediately instead of after a delay. On June 10, 2003, the Court of Appeal for Ontario confirmed that Canadian law on marriage violated the equality provisions in Section 15 of the Canadian Charter of Rights and Freedoms in being restricted to heterosexual couples. The Court of Appeal struck down the stay of judgment given in the 2002 ruling, thereby causing the judgment to come into effect immediately. The court wrote in its ruling:

Marriage is ... one of the most significant forms of personal relationships. For centuries, marriage has been a basic element of social organization in societies around the world. Through the institution of marriage, individuals can publicly express their love and commitment to each other ... This public recognition and sanction of marital relationships reflect society's approbation of the personal hopes, desires and aspirations that underlie loving, committed conjugal relationships. This can only enhance an individual's sense of self-worth and dignity.

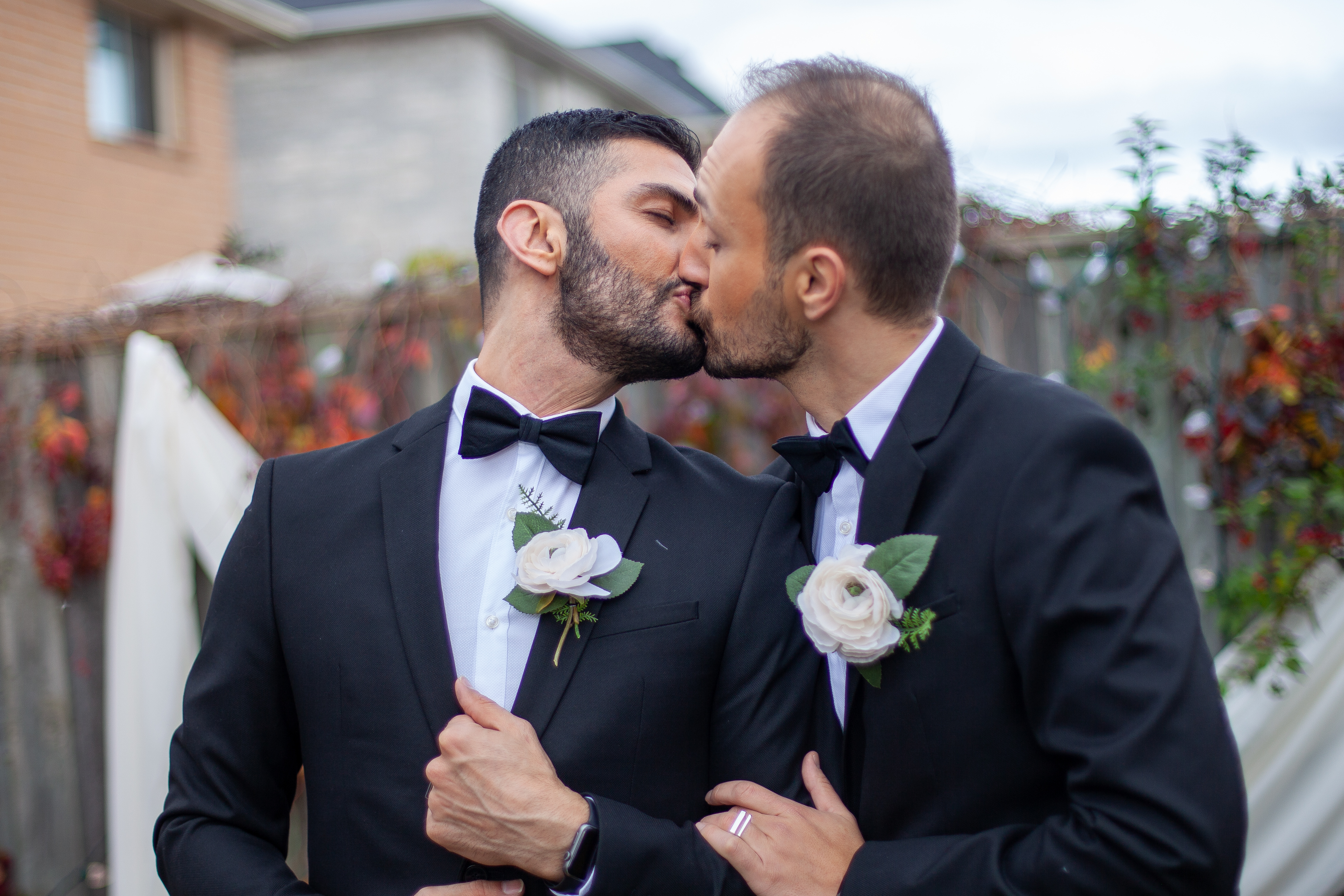
A same-sex couple kissing on their wedding day in Toronto, 2020

Although the definition of marriage is governed by federal law, the court only had jurisdiction to implement the ruling within Ontario. The province became the first jurisdiction in North America to recognize same-sex marriage, and the third in the world after the Netherlands and Belgium. Consequently, the city of Toronto announced that the city clerk would begin issuing marriage licences to same-sex couples. The next day, the Attorney General of Ontario, Norm Sterling, announced that the province would comply with the ruling, "I'm charged to follow the laws and will follow the laws with regards to this matter." The first marriage licence issued to a same-sex couple was to Michael Leshner and Michael Stark, who had the usual waiting period waived and completed the formalities of marriage just hours after the court ruling, on June 10, 2003. The court also ruled that two couples, Kevin Bourassa and Joe Varnell, and Elaine Vautour and Anne Vautour, who had previously attempted to marry using an ancient common-law procedure called "reading the banns" would be considered legally married. Their marriages were performed in the Metropolitan Community Church of Toronto on January 14, 2001 by Reverend Brent Hawkes. Justice Minister Martin Cauchon reacted to the ruling by stating, "Listen, the marriages that are taking place now are effectively legal marriages on the basis of the decision of the appeal court rendered [on 10 June]. I say for the time being because I can't presume the future. We want to make sure that we're going to have a national solution to that question. Having said that, I'm not in a position to today to give you the official government position." Paul Martin, then campaigning for prime minister, expressed his support for the decision. Kyle Rae, a member of the Toronto City Council, said, "It's a momentous day. It is a great day for equality in Canada." A spokesperson for Focus on the Family said, "Today's court ruling on same-sex marriage ignores centuries of precedent, and renders ordinary Canadians' views irrelevant." An opinion poll published by The Globe and Mail a few days after the decision showed that a majority of Canadians supported same-sex marriage.

Two conservative groups who had been granted intervenor status, the Interfaith Coalition on Marriage and Family, and the Association for Marriage and the Family, attempted to appeal the decision to the Supreme Court of Canada. The court heard the petition on 6 October 2003. A lawyer for the groups said, "The court is focused on hearing cases of public importance, and I don't think there has been one more important than this that has come up in the last few years. This is not the case of a stranger coming off the street. The nation is saying this [marriage] is our biggest institution. Parliament has not spoken. There is confusion. The court should speak on this issue." The federal government and the couples who initiated the lawsuit asked the court to reject the petition. The court took only three days to unanimously reject the request. A spokesman for Canadians for Equal Marriage said, "The practical effect of the Supreme Court's ruling ...is to say that same-sex marriage in Ontario and British Columbia are here to stay." Meanwhile, a spokesman for the Evangelical Fellowship of Canada said they were disappointed, "We have lost an important opportunity to express the concerns of millions of Canadians." Further, the Ontario Court of Appeal declared the Divorce Act unconstitutional for excluding same-sex couples on September 13, 2004. It ordered same-sex marriages read into that act, permitting the plaintiffs, a lesbian couple, to divorce.

Previously, a same-sex couple, Paula Barrero and Blanca Mejias, had been able to marry by banns at the Emmanuel Howard Park United Church in Toronto, a congregation of the United Church of Canada, on September 29, 2001. The officiant was Reverend Cheri DiNovo. The Office of the Registrar General mistook the name Paula to be that of a man and certified the marriage. The marriage caught media attention and a representative of the Office of the Registrar General sent a letter to the United Church requesting that DiNovo lose her licence. The church distanced itself from DiNovo but did not strip her of her licence.

== Provincial legislation ==
On February 24, 2005, the Spousal Relationships Statute Law Amendment Act, 2005 was passed in the Legislative Assembly, which performed "housekeeping" on various Ontario laws, to bring their wording into line with the court ruling. Further, the bill ensures that no religious institution or clergy are forced to perform a ceremony against their beliefs. There is no such provision for civil officials. It received royal assent by Lieutenant Governor James Bartleman on March 9, 2005. The Assembly of Catholic Bishops of Ontario supported the legislation, releasing the following statement: "Priests will have some protection, they won't find themselves in court. The Bishops wanted to be sure that religious bodies could not be compelled to allow their properties to be used for purposes associated with same-sex unions if such are contrary to their teachings, as is true for the Catholic Church. The Bill clearly provides this protection and the Ontario Bishops accordingly support it."

The Marriage Act (French: Loi sur le mariage; Cree: ᐐᑭᐦᑐᐎᓐ ᐗᓚᔓᐌᐎᓐ, Wîkihtowin Walašowêwin; Ojibwe: Wiidigendiwin Onaakonigewin; Oji-Cree: ᐏᑭᐦᑐᐏᐣ ᐅᓈᐦᑯᓂᑫᐏᐣ, Wikihtowin Onaahkonikewin) states that each of the parties to a marriage shall declare to the other:

I call upon these persons here present to witness that I, AB, do take you, CD, to be my lawful wedded wife (or to be my lawful wedded husband or to be my lawful wedded partner or to be my lawful wedded spouse) [R.S.O. 1990, c. M.3, s. 24(3)]

On November 29, 2016, the All Families Are Equal Act (Parentage and Related Registrations Statute Law Amendment), 2016 passed the Legislative Assembly by 79 votes to 0. The bill provides presumption to the spouse or conjugal partner of the birth parent, ensuring that couples who use a sperm or egg donor or a surrogate are automatically recognized as parents, and as such do not have to adopt their own children. It received royal assent by Lieutenant Governor Elizabeth Dowdeswell on December 5 and took effect on January 1, 2017.

29 November 2016 vote in the Legislative Assembly
Party	Voted for	Voted against	Absent (Did not vote)
Ontario Liberal Party	48: Laura Albanese; Granville Anderson; Yvan Baker; Chris Ballard; Lorenzo Berardinetti; Jim Bradley; Michael Chan; Bob Chiarelli; Michael Colle; Michael Coteau; Grant Crack; Dipika Damerla; Steven Del Duca; Nathalie Des Rosiers; Vic Dhillon; Han Dong; Kevin Flynn; John Fraser; Ann Hoggarth; Eric Hoskins; Mitzie Hunter; Helena Jaczek; Sophie Kiwala; Jeff Leal; Tracy MacCharles; Amrit Mangat; Cristina Martins; Deb Matthews; Bill Mauro; Kathryn McGarry; Eleanor McMahon; Ted McMeekin; Peter Milczyn; Reza Moridi; Glen Murray; Indira Naidoo-Harris; Yasir Naqvi; David Orazietti; Arthur Potts; Shafiq Qaadri; Lou Rinaldi; Liz Sandals; Charles Sousa; Harinder Takhar; Glenn Thibeault; Daiene Vernile; Soo Wong; David Zimmer	–	9: Bob Delaney; Joe Dickson; Brad Duguid; Michael Gravelle; Monte Kwinter; Marie-France Lalonde; Harinder Malhi; Mario Sergio; Kathleen Wynne
Progressive Conservative Party	17: Ted Arnott; Patrick Brown; Steve Clark; Lorne Coe; Vic Fedeli; Randy Hillier; Sylvia Jones; Gila Martow; Jim McDonell; Norm Miller; Julia Munro; Laurie Scott; Todd Smith; Lisa Thompson; Bill Walker; Jim Wilson; John Yakabuski	–	11: Bob Bailey; Toby Barrett; Raymond Cho; Ernie Hardeman; Michael Harris; Jack MacLaren; Lisa MacLeod; Monte McNaughton; Rick Nicholls; Randy Pettapiece; Jeff Yurek
Ontario New Democratic Party	14: Teresa Armstrong; Cheri DiNovo; Catherine Fife; Jennifer French; Wayne Gates; France Gélinas; Lisa Gretzky; Percy Hatfield; Paul Miller; Taras Natyshak; Peggy Sattler; Jagmeet Singh; Peter Tabuns; John Vanthof	–	6: Gilles Bisson; Sarah Campbell; Cindy Forster; Andrea Horwath; Michael Mantha; Monique Taylor
Total (Note: The Speaker of the Legislative Assembly of Ontario, Dave Levac, votes only in case of a tied vote. Additionally, Sam Oosterhoff, MPP for Niagara West, was only sworn in on 30 November, the day after the vote.)	79	0	26
Total	74.5%	0.0%	24.5%

== First Nations ==
While the Indian Act governs many aspects of life for First Nations in Canada, it does not directly govern marriage or provide a framework for conducting customary marriages. Instead, marriage laws are primarily governed by provincial and territorial legislation. However, the Indian Act has some indirect impacts on marriage, particularly regarding band membership and property rights on reserves. Traditional Indigenous law does not address same-sex unions. For instance, the Great Law of Peace (Mohawk: Kaianereʼkó꞉wa; Oneida: Kayanlʌhslaˀkó; Onondaga: Gayanehsä꞉go꞉nah; Cayuga: Gayę́ne̱hsraˀgó꞉wah; Seneca: Gayáneshä́ʼgo꞉wa꞉h; Tuscarora: Kayanręhstí·yu·) is silent on the issue, only stating that members of the same clan are forbidden to marry.

While there are no records of same-sex marriages being performed in First Nations cultures in the way they are commonly defined in Western legal systems, many Indigenous communities recognize identities and relationships that may be placed on the LGBT spectrum. Among these are two-spirit individuals—people who embody both masculine and feminine qualities. In some cultures, two-spirit individuals assigned male at birth wear women's clothing and engage in household and artistic work associated with the feminine sphere. Historically, this identity sometimes allowed for unions between two people of the same biological sex. The Ojibwe refer to two-spirit people as niizh manidoowag (pronounced [niːʒ maˈnɪˌdoːˌwak]), (Note: The cognate term in Delaware, spoken by the Lenape, is nisha manëtuwàk (pronounced [ˈniʃa manəˈtuwʌk]).) a term that inspired the modern umbrella term "two-spirit". Many niizh manidoowag were wives in polygynous households. Among the Moose Cree, two-spirit individuals—known as iskwehkâsow (ᐃᔅᑴᐦᑳᓱᐤ, pronounced [ɪsˈkweːhkaːˌsow])—are regarded as "esteemed persons with special spiritual powers" and are "noted shamans". It is likely that they could marry cisgender men. Other nations also have distinct terms and respected roles for two-spirit people. The Seneca use hënöjaʼjáʼgöh, the Cayuga use deyodǫhétra꞉ge꞉, and the Tuscarora use ruˀnhęhsú·kęˀ. In these communities, elders describe two-spirit people as "special and powerful", often honoured as medicine people or healers. The Mohawk refer to them as onón꞉wat (pronounced [oˈnũ̌ːwat]), meaning "I have the pattern of two spirits inside my body."

== Marriage statistics ==
The 2016 Canadian census showed that 26,585 same-sex couples were living in Ontario, mostly in Toronto and Ottawa. 38.2% of these couples were married.

== Religious performance ==
Several dioceses of the Anglican Church of Canada allow their clergy to bless and perform same-sex marriages. In 2007, a priest in Stirling-Rawdon was disciplined for marrying a same-sex couple. The Diocese of Ottawa has allowed solemnization of same-sex marriages since 2016. In July 2016, Bishop John Chapman issued a letter allowing local parishes in the Diocese of Ottawa to perform same-sex marriages. The dioceses of Niagara and Toronto have also authorized their clergy to perform same-sex marriages since July and November 2016, respectively. In July 2019, Bishop Linda Nicholls allowed clergy in the Diocese of Huron to perform same-sex marriages. In October 2019, the synod of the Diocese of Ontario voted to request that Bishop Michael Oulton authorize the solemnization of same-sex marriages in the diocese; he issued guidelines the following month for clergy willing to perform same-sex marriages. Bishop Geoffrey Woodcroft said in July 2019 that clergy in the Diocese of Rupert's Land, encompassing parts of northwestern Ontario, would be permitted to perform same-sex marriages from January 2020. Similarly, Bishop Anne Germond authorized clergy in the Diocese of Algoma to perform same-sex marriages in May 2020. In these dioceses, clergy are not required to officiate at the marriages if this would violate their personal beliefs. On the other hand, same-sex marriages are not performed in the Diocese of Moosonee, which encompasses parts of northern Ontario. The marriage canon of the Anglican Church of Canada serves as the canon on marriage in the diocese. Bishop Lydia Mamakwa of the Indigenous Spiritual Ministry of Mishamikoweesh, encompassing Cree and Ojibwe communities in northwestern Ontario, opposes same-sex marriage, and the diocese does not perform same-sex marriages.

Some other religious organisations also perform same-sex marriages in their places of worship, including the United Church of Canada, Quakers, the Evangelical Lutheran Church in Canada, and the Canadian Unitarian Council. In February 2023, the Southridge Community Church and the FreeChurch Toronto, congregations of the Canadian Conference of Mennonite Brethren Churches located in St. Catharines and Toronto respectively, were expelled from the denomination over their decision to affirm same-sex marriages.

== See also ==
- Martha McCarthy
- Recognition of same-sex unions in the Americas
- LGBT rights in Canada
- Same-sex marriage in Canada
