= The Secret Bench of Knowledge =

Public sculpture in Ontario

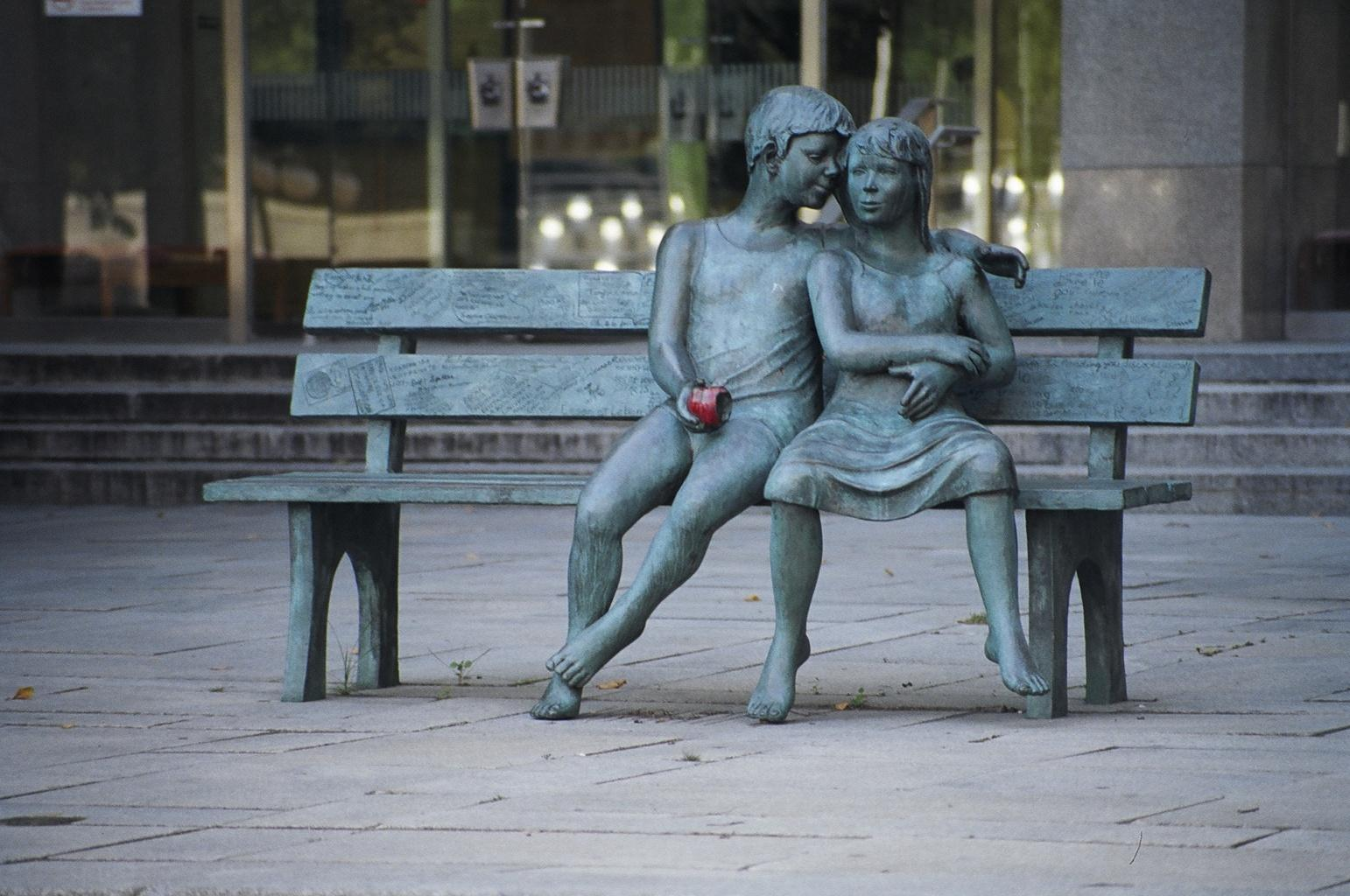
- The Secret Bench of Knowledge
- Artist: Lea Vivot
- Year: 1994
- Medium: Bronze
- Location: Ottawa, Ontario, Canada

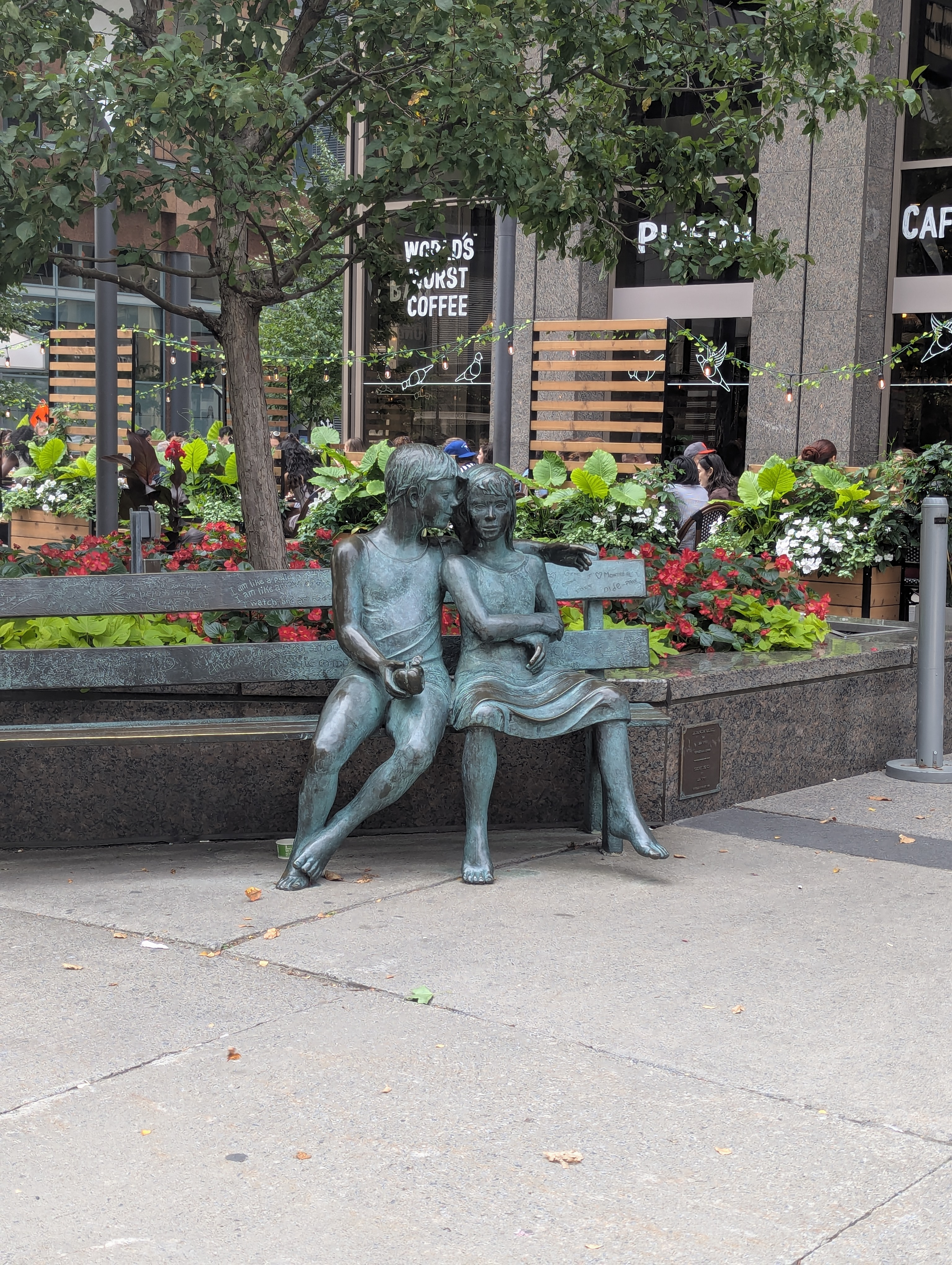
The Secret Bench of Knowledge on McGill College Avenue in Montréal

The Secret Bench of Knowledge (formerly Secret Bench, Lost Paradise) is a sculpture created by Canadian artist Lea Vivot and produced in multiple castings. A prominent one is located at the entrance to the Wellington Street Library and Archives Canada in Ottawa, where it was initially placed in 1989 on the artist's own initiative. One year later, Vivot removed it, and it was replaced four years later by Eugene Boccia from Toronto. The sculpture was unveiled at about 9 AM on the morning of May 1, 1994 in front of a crowd of about 3000 people. The sculpture has many messages inscribed on it, written by school children, about the importance and pleasure of reading.

Other locations for the sculpture include various cities in Ontario (including Sarnia), as well as Montreal (June 1989), New York City, and outside the Four Seasons Hotel in Prague, Czechia.

The unveiling of the new statue was done by Vivot, assisted by a young blind boy named Gabriel McBride, from Spruce View, Alberta, who inscribed his message in Braille.

The bench can also be seen on McGill College Avenue in Montreal, Québec.
