= Jeff Rock =

Canadian politician

The Reverend Jeff Rock
- Born: 1983 or 1984 (age 42–43); Sudbury, Ontario, Canada
- Education: McGill University
- Religion: Christian
- Church: Metropolitan Community Church (2017-2023); United Church of Canada
- Congregations served: Metropolitan Community Church of Toronto

Jeff Rock (born 1983 or 1984) is a Canadian clergyman, who succeeded Brent Hawkes as the pastor of the Metropolitan Community Church of Toronto in fall 2017.

Born and raised in Sudbury, Ontario, he came out as gay in high school. He studied microbiology and immunology at McGill University, initially with the career goal of becoming an HIV/AIDS researcher, although he decided during his studies that he instead wanted to become a minister. After completing his seminary studies, he became the pastor of Gaetz Memorial United Church in Red Deer, Alberta, where he worked with organizations such as the Central Alberta AIDS Network, the local Truth and Reconcilaition Commission, the Urban Aboriginal Voices Society and the Red Deer Interfaith Network. He ran as a Liberal Party of Canada candidate for the electoral district of Red Deer—Lacombe in the 2015 election, against incumbent MP Blaine Calkins.

He gave his first sermon to Toronto's MCC congregation on July 9, 2017, at a service dedicated to the memory of former Toronto City Councillor Pam McConnell. He officially succeeded Hawkes on October 1. Resigned from his position on January 18, 2023 after a two month leave of absence.

== Electoral record ==
2015 Canadian federal election: Red Deer—Lacombe
| Party | Candidate | Votes | % | ±% | Expenditures |
|---|---|---|---|---|---|
| Conservative | Blaine Calkins | 43,599 | 70.71 | -6.72 | $75,006.35 |
| Liberal | Jeff Rock | 9,235 | 14.98 | +11.41 | $16,605.92 |
| New Democratic | Doug Hart | 7,055 | 11.44 | -2.85 | $5,541.40 |
| Green | Les Kuzyk | 1,773 | 2.88 | -1.84 | – |
| Total valid votes/Expense limit | | 61,662 | 100.00 | | $224,841.10 |
| Total rejected ballots | | 176 | 0.28 | – | |
| Turnout | | 61,838 | 71.40 | – | |
| Eligible voters | | 86,609 | | | |
| Conservative hold | | Swing | | -9.07 | |
Source: Elections Canada
