= Lea Vivot =

Czech-born Canadian sculptor (born 1948)

- Born: Drahomíra Hekelová; 1948 (age 77–78); Šumperk-Horní Temenice, Czechoslovakia (Moravia)
- Education: Ontario College of Art, Prague, Milan, Italy and New York City,
- Known for: sculptor, graphic artist and printmaker

Lea Vivot is a Czech-born Canadian sculptor. She has studied at the Ontario College of Art in Toronto, Ontario as well as Prague, Czechoslovakia, Milan, Italy and New York City, United States. Although her main focus is sculpture, Vivot is also active in drawing and printmaking. Vivot’s over life-sized bronze sculptures are figurative and often depict families, couples, mothers, children, and other subjects of humanity. Most of her sculptures include benches, which have become her trademark.

== Works by Vivot ==
- Following the death of New Democratic Party leader Jack Layton, Vivot announced that she would create three different public statues of him, for Toronto, Ottawa, and his hometown of Hudson, Quebec.
- Tommy Douglas (Weyburn, Saskatchewan)
- The Secret Bench of Knowledge (Library and Archives Canada, Ottawa)
- Endless Bench (Located at front of Toronto's Hospital for Sick Children)
- Le banc des amoureux (Montreal Botanical Garden, Montreal)
- Le banc du secret (Le 2001 McGill College, Montreal)
- Joy Of Life (1983): Montreal 1434 Sherbrooke Ave. West
- Lavička neřesti The Bench of Vice, K Žižkovu 1851/4, Prague

== Gallery ==
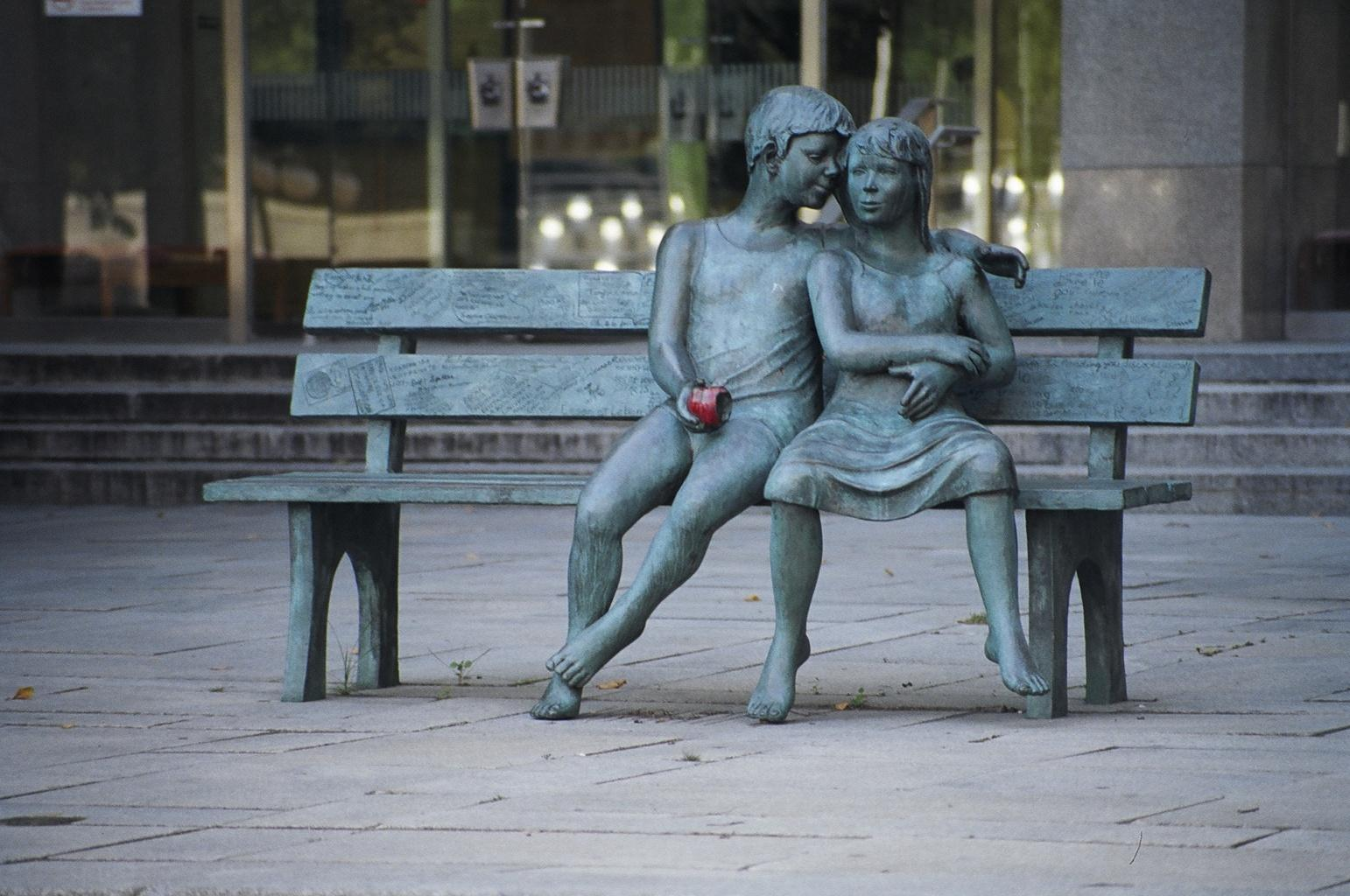
Lea Vivot's The Secret Bench of Knowledge (Library and Archives Canada, Ottawa)

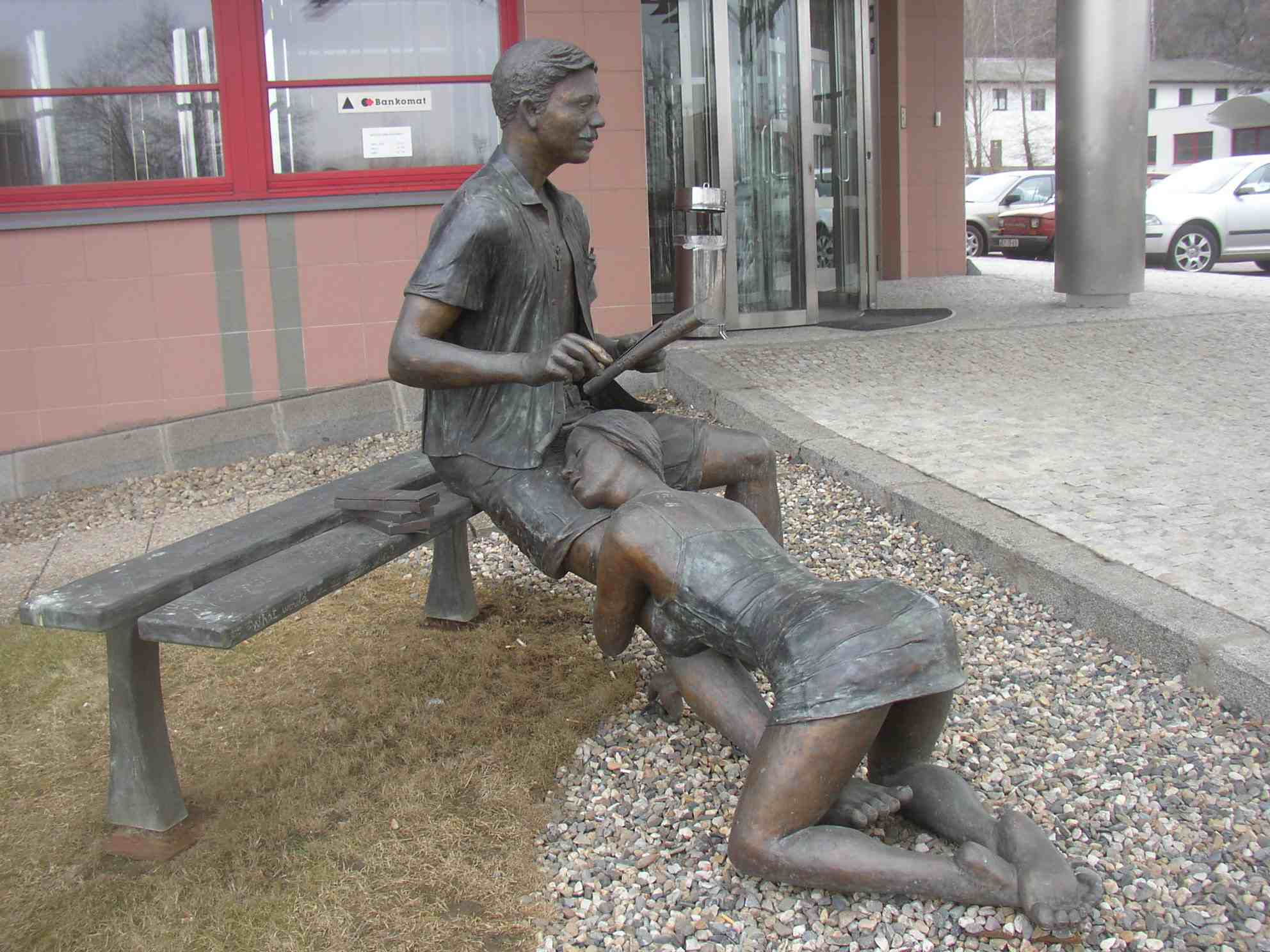
The Bench of Vice (Lavička neřesti) (Sazka building, Prague)

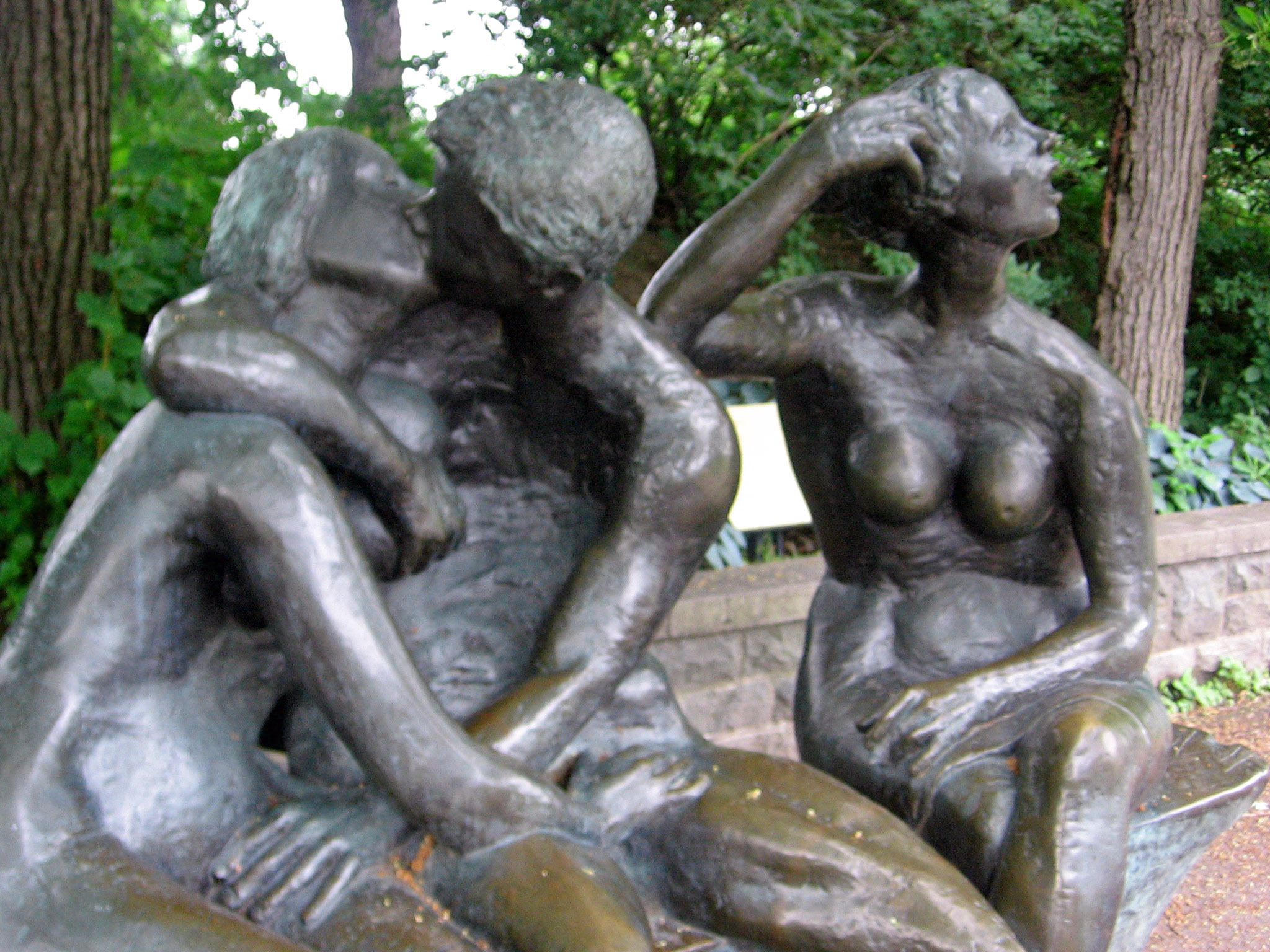
Lea Vivot's Le banc des amoureux (Montreal Botanical Garden, Montreal)
