= Bob Wolfe (clergyman) =

American pastor

Robert Wolfe was an American clergyman with the Metropolitan Community Church, most noted as the founding pastor of the Metropolitan Community Church of Toronto in Toronto, Ontario, Canada.

Previously pastor of the church's congregation in Sacramento, California, he was assigned to head up a new Toronto congregation in 1973, and performed his first mass at the Toronto church on July 17, 1973.

In January 1974, he became noted for talking a young man out of committing suicide. The teenager, distraught over being gay, had climbed onto a beam outside the observation deck at Toronto City Hall and was threatening to jump, but Wolfe was called in and successfully counselled the young man back to safety. A few weeks later, Toronto City Council presented him with a citation of bravery for his role in defusing the situation. He used his acceptance speech to criticize the Toronto Star for its refusal to print an advertisement for the church; the reaction to his announcement led the Star to reverse its decision and print the advertisement the following day.

Wolfe stepped down as pastor of MCC Toronto in 1978, and was succeeded by Brent Hawkes.
