= Brent Hawkes =

Canadian clergyman and gay rights activist (born 1950)

The Reverend Brent Hawkes CM ONB
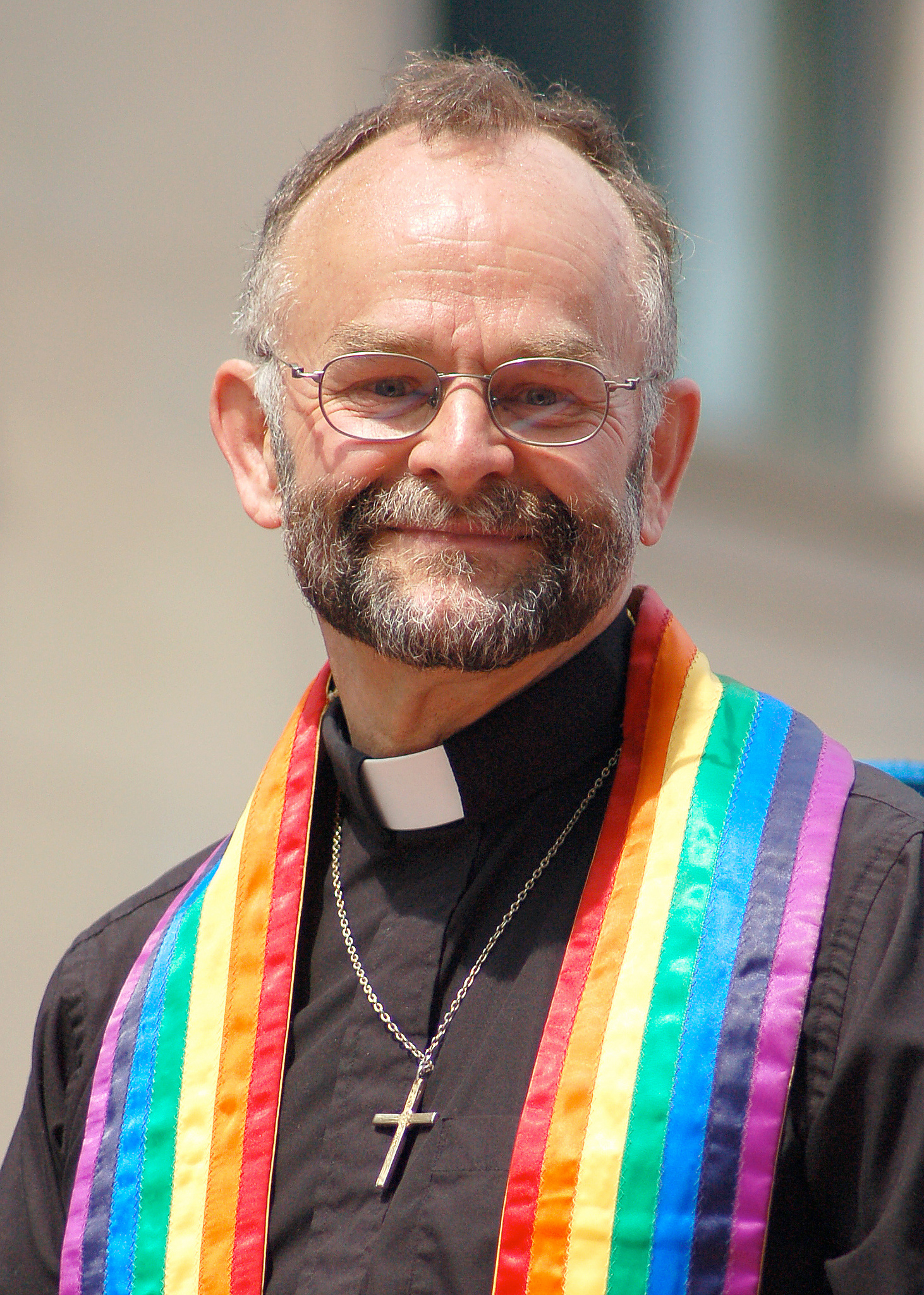
- Hawkes in 2006
- Born: June 2, 1950 (age 76); Bath, New Brunswick, Canada
- Education: Mount Allison University; Trinity College, Toronto
- Years active: 1978–2017
- Spouse: John Sproule (m. 2006)

Ecclesiastical career
- Religion: Christianity
- Church: Metropolitan Community Church

Brent Hawkes (born June 2, 1950) is a Canadian gay rights activist and clergy member at the Metropolitan Community Church (MCC), also known as the Universal Fellowship of Metropolitan Community Churches (UFMCC), which is an international LGBT-affirming mainline Protestant Christian denomination.

== Early life and education ==
Hawkes was born in Bath, New Brunswick, to a Baptist family. Hawkes earned Bachelor of Science (1972) and Bachelor of Education (1973) degrees from Mount Allison University, before working as a teacher in Nova Scotia's Annapolis Valley in the late 1970s. He then earned Master of Divinity (1986) and Doctor of Ministry (2001) degrees from Trinity College, an Anglican institution at the University of Toronto.

== Religious career and activism ==
Hawkes was appointed as senior pastor of the Metropolitan Community Church of Toronto, a church openly affirming for LGBTQ parishioners, in 1978, succeeding Bob Wolfe.

Hawkes has served on the advisory committee of PrideVision TV and on the board of directors of advocacy group Egale Canada. In addition to his advocacy work on LGBT issues, he has supported anti-racist initiatives, drawn attention to poverty and poor housing, and advocated the ordination of female priests.

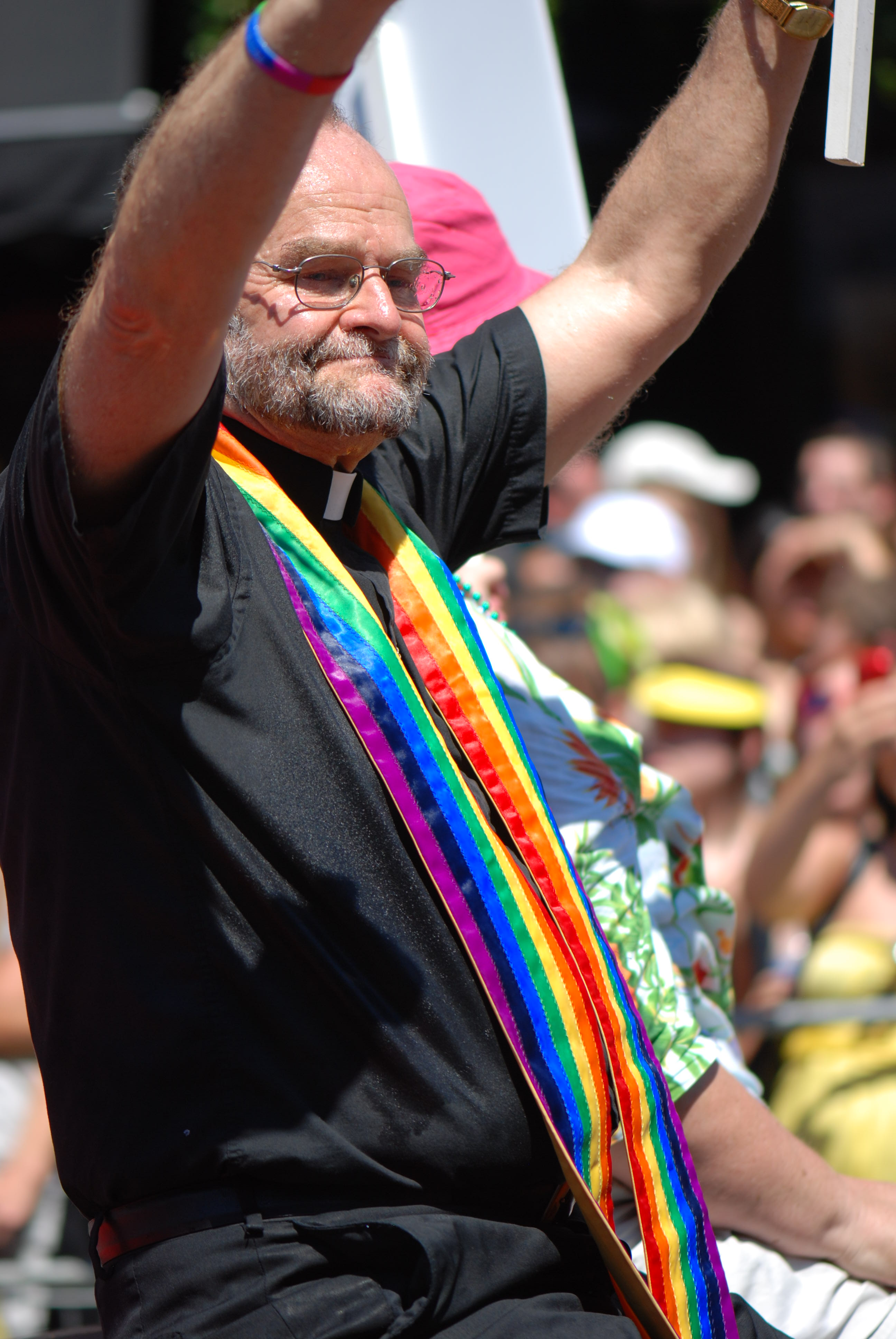
Hawkes at Pride Week in Toronto in 2010

On January 14, 2001, Hawkes gained national attention by performing a wedding ceremony for two same-sex couples at the Metropolitan Community Church of Toronto. Although city clerks would not issue marriage licenses for same-sex marriages at this time, Hawkes employed the alternative provided in Ontario law for regular church attendees to publish official banns for three consecutive weeks, and thereby conducted a legal marriage without requiring prior government permission. In the spirit of the banns as a public opportunity for interested parties to raise legal objections, the church also issued a press release in late 2000 announcing its intentions. The government of Jean Chrétien did not endorse the marriages, although Governor-General Adrienne Clarkson sent a personal letter of support. The city clerk refused to register the record of marriage, leading to a court battle. The church sued the city, the province, and the federal government. On July 12, 2002, the Ontario Superior Court of Justice ruled that the marriages performed by Hawkes in January 2001 were legal, but stayed its decision pending a possible appeal, and on June 10, 2003, the Court of Appeal for Ontario declared the common law definition of marriage as "invalid to the extent that it refers to 'one man and one woman'" in the ruling of Halpern v. Canada, immediately striking down all barriers against same-sex marriage in the province.

Hawkes officiated the state funeral of Jack Layton on August 27, 2011, at Roy Thomson Hall. A fellow New Democrat, he spoke highly of Layton, thanking him for his work with the gay community and on HIV/AIDS, issues Layton had championed when they were not popular.

He retired as pastor of the Metropolitan Community Church in fall 2017, and was succeeded by Jeff Rock.

== Political career ==
In the Ontario provincial election of 1995, Hawkes ran as a candidate of the social-democratic New Democratic Party in the riding of St. George—St. David, which has a large LGBT community. Running in protest against the Bob Rae government's handling of the failed Equality Rights Statute Amendment Act of 1994, he finished third with 9,672 votes – fewer than one thousand votes behind the winner, Progressive Conservative Al Leach. Hawkes's showing played a major role in defeating incumbent Liberal Tim Murphy.

== Personal life ==
Hawkes lives in Toronto with John Sproule, his partner since 1981. They married on March 7, 2006.

=== Sexual assault allegations ===
On February 1, 2016, Hawkes was charged in the Provincial Court of Nova Scotia with indecent assault and gross indecency for an alleged sexual assault against a minor between 1974 and 1975 when Hawkes was a teacher in Nova Scotia. Hawkes pleaded not guilty, and was acquitted of all charges on January 31, 2017, with the judge ruling there were "significant inconsistencies in the testimony of the witnesses".

== Honours and awards ==
In 2009, Hawkes received an honorary Doctorate of Laws degree, for his continuing work in activism and human rights in Canada, from York University. In 2010, Hawkes was presented with an honorary Doctorate of Laws from Mount Allison University, and in 2011 received an honorary Doctorate of Divinity from Trinity College, Toronto.

Hawkes was appointed a Member of the Order of Canada by Governor General Michaëlle Jean in 2007 for his achievements as "a champion of human rights and social justice for decades" and was formally invested into the Order in a ceremony on February 22, 2008.

In 2012, Hawkes was named one of the "500 most influential gay men in the world" by the European gay magazine Mate; and in 2013 he was inducted into the Q Hall of Fame for significant contributions to LGBT human rights.

Hawkes has also been the recipient of the following awards:

- 1994 – City of Toronto Award of Merit
- 1995 – United Nations Association in Canada Global Citizen Award
- 2002 – Queen Elizabeth II Golden Jubilee Medal
- 2003 – City of Toronto Pride Award for 2SLGBTQ+ inclusion
- 2009 – New Brunswick Human Rights Commission Pioneer of Human Rights Award
- 2009 – American Psychological Association Clarity Award
- 2012 – Queen Elizabeth II Diamond Jubilee Medal
- 2014 – Inspire Lifetime Achievement Award
- 2014 – WorldPride Parade Grand Marshal
- 2014 – Toronto City Hall Achievement Award
- 2015 – Order of New Brunswick
