= Death and state funeral of Jack Layton =

2011 death of the Canadian opposition leader

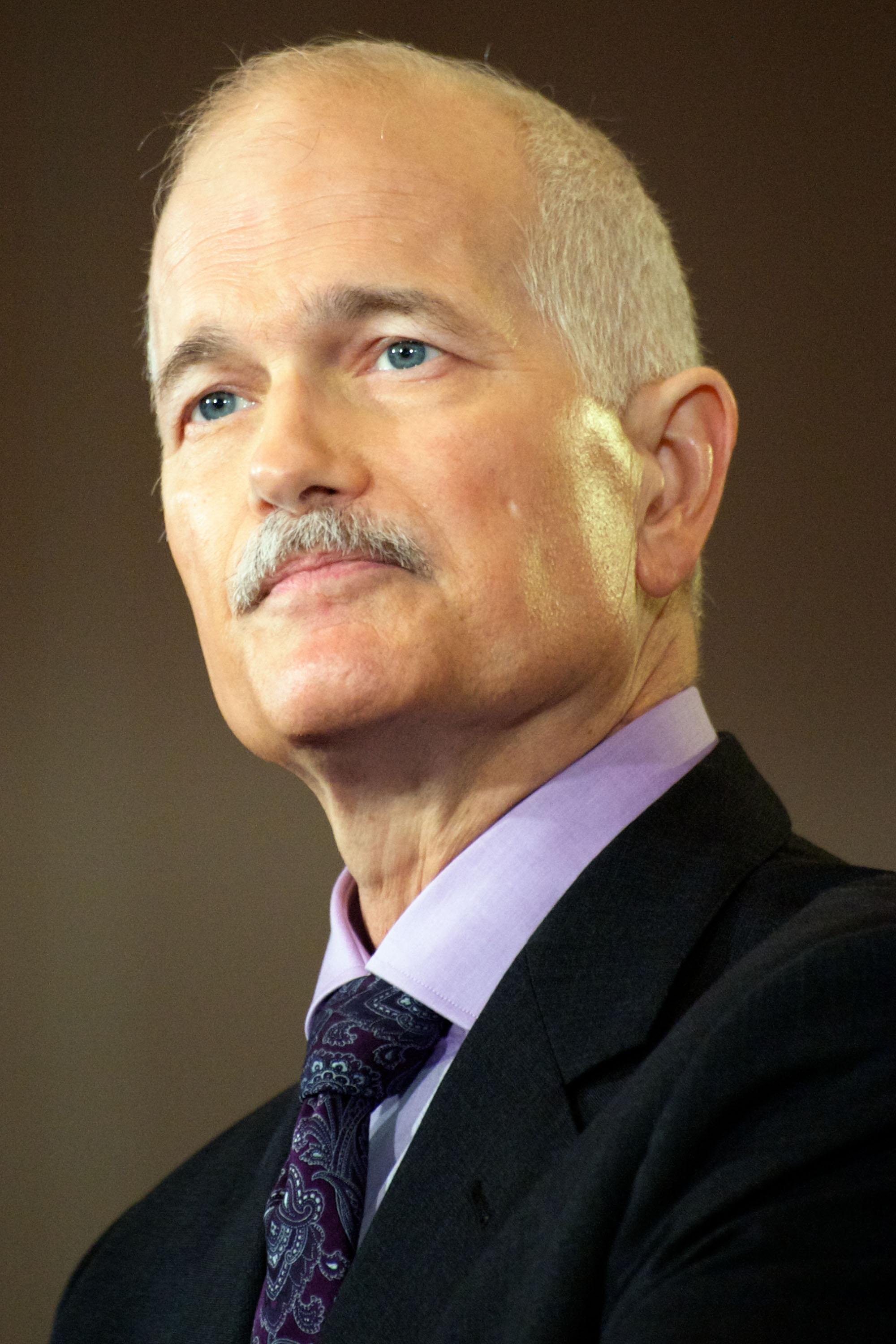
Jack Layton five months prior to his death

On August 22, 2011, Canadian New Democratic Party leader and Leader of the Opposition Jack Layton died from an unspecified cancer at the age of 61. Prior to his diagnosis, Layton led his party to historic gains (from 37 seats to 103) during the 2011 federal election. His state funeral was held on Saturday, August 27, 2011 at Roy Thomson Hall in Toronto. Protocol does not mandate state funerals for a Leader of the Opposition as it does for Prime Ministers and Governors General, but Prime Minister Stephen Harper used his discretion to offer the honour, via the Governor General-in-Council, to Layton's widow Olivia Chow. Layton's death sparked a wave of mourning from Canadians of various political beliefs.

In the early hours of August 24, the flag-draped casket was taken from Rosar-Morrison Funeral Home in Toronto with Toronto Police Service escort towards Ottawa. The hearse arrived in Ottawa, was greeted by a Guard of Honour of Royal Canadian Mounted Police officers and Ceremonial Guard members, and the casket was taken into the Centre Block by pallbearers from the Guard of Honour to lie in state in the lobby for the House of Commons for two days. To a 15-gun salute, the cortege departed Ottawa to Gatineau, Quebec, and Layton's body was then moved to Toronto (via escort from Toronto Police) to lie in repose at Toronto City Hall. There, the casket was taken from the hearse by Toronto Police pallbearers into the Rotunda until Saturday's funeral.

On August 27, Layton's casket was transported from Toronto City Hall to Roy Thomson Hall via mounted police escort. Thousands of people lined the procession route and the event was covered nationwide by Canada's major media outlets.

== Illness ==
On February 5, 2010, Layton announced that he had been diagnosed with prostate cancer. He noted that his father Robert Layton had suffered from the same type of cancer 17 years before and recovered from it. His wife, Olivia Chow, had also recovered from thyroid cancer a few years before. He vowed to beat the cancer and said it would not interrupt his duties as member of Parliament or as leader of the NDP.

Following the 2011 federal election, Layton announced on July 25, 2011, that he would be taking a temporary leave from his post to fight an unspecified, newly diagnosed cancer. There was little discussion as to its type or prognosis, but it has been suggested that it was metastasis into bone cancer or lymphoma. He was hoping to return as leader of the NDP upon the resumption of the House of Commons on September 19, 2011. Layton recommended that NDP caucus chair Nycole Turmel serve as interim leader during his leave of absence. Layton died at 4:45 am ET on August 22, 2011, at his home in Toronto, Ontario, aged 61.

== Tributes ==
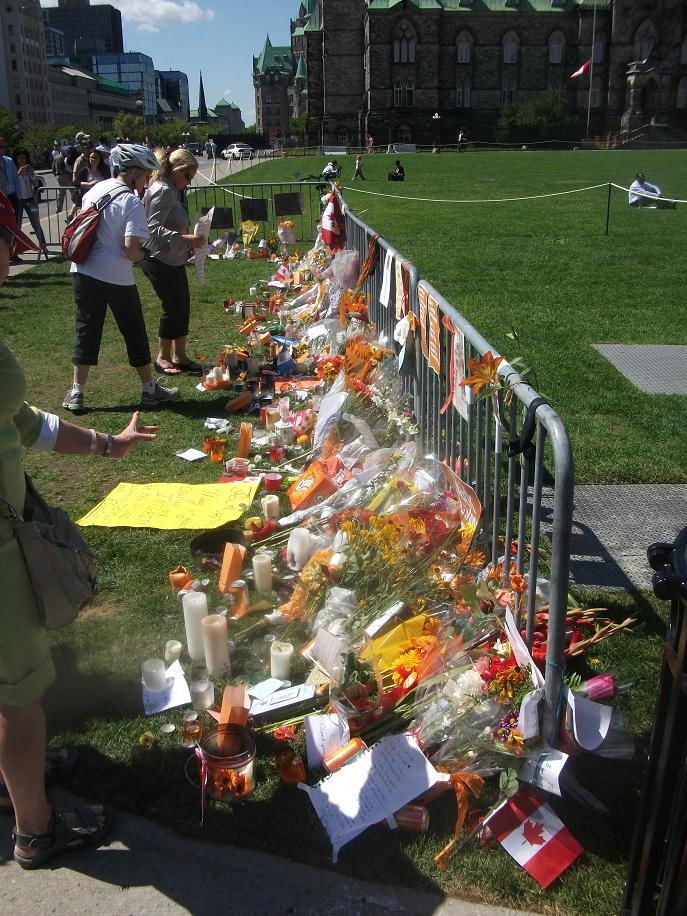
Memorial on Parliament Hill in Ottawa

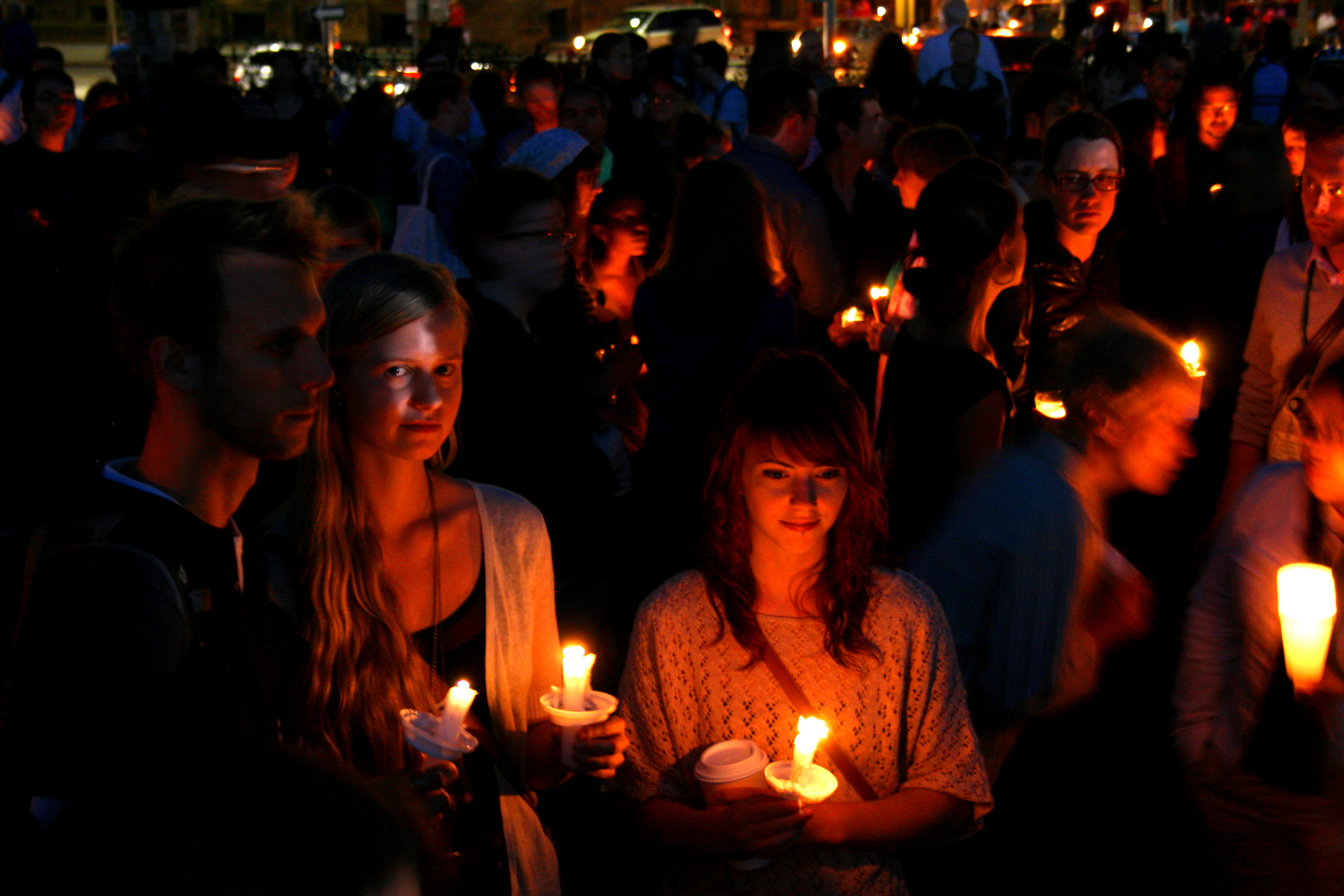
Mourners at a vigil on Parliament Hill in Ottawa

Upon hearing the news, NDP deputy leader Libby Davies said, "He was a great Canadian. He gave his life to this country. His commitment to social justice and equality and a better Canada in the world and at home. I think that’s how people saw him, they saw the courage that he had. He faced cancer and he kept on working, doing his job, because he felt so strongly about what he believed in." Governor General David Johnston expressed "As leader of Her Majesty's Loyal Opposition, Mr. Layton was held in great esteem by Canadians for his passionate dedication to the public good... His fundamental decency and his love of our country serve as examples to us all, and he will be greatly missed." Prime Minister Stephen Harper said: "On behalf of all Canadians, I salute Jack's contribution to public life, a contribution that will be sorely missed. I know one thing: Jack gave his fight against cancer everything he had. Indeed, Jack never backed down from any fight." He also expressed regret that he and Layton, both musicians (Harper plays piano and Layton played guitar), had never gotten the opportunity to make good on their promise to "jam" together.

The United States Ambassador to Canada David Jacobson said, "I just received the sad news that Jack Layton has passed away. On behalf of my family as well as the American people I want to express our sorrow to Jack's wife Olivia Chow, his family, and his friends and supporters across Canada. I will never forget the image of Jack campaigning as the happy warrior. His energy, enthusiasm and passion for politics and for the Canadian people were undeniable. Something I will never forget. A standard for all of us."

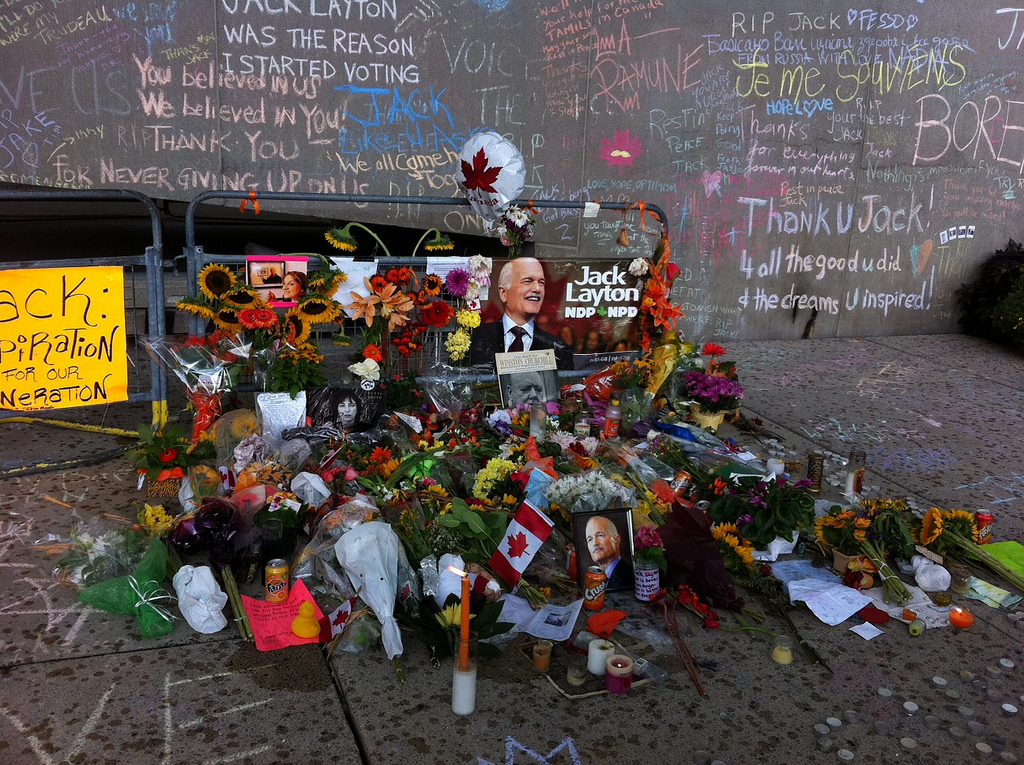
The impromptu memorial set up at Toronto City Hall for Layton

Spontaneous remembrance gatherings were held in communities across the country, including Ottawa, Toronto, Vancouver, Montreal, Halifax, St. John's, Calgary, Edmonton, Quebec City, Sherbrooke, Victoria, Surrey, Winnipeg, Brantford, Sarnia, Guelph, Sudbury, and Corner Brook. In Toronto, coloured chalk messages of condolences and appreciation to Layton and his family came to cover all of Nathan Phillips Square in front of Toronto City Hall, to such an extent that city archivists photographed the messages for posterity. Many municipalities offered books of condolences for residents to sign, as did NDP MPs' constituency offices, and the Canadian National Exhibition created a Messages of Sympathy wall for the public to sign. There are currently several grassroots proposals to rename landmarks in Layton's memory, including one for Jack Layton Square in Toronto, and one for Jack Layton Boulevard in Montreal.

On the evening following Layton's funeral, the CN Tower and the Niagara Falls were lit in orange (the colour of the NDP) in his honour from sunset to sunrise.

During a visit to Parliament Hill, Prime Minister of the United Kingdom David Cameron, paid tribute to Layton, stating that: "I offer sincere condolences to Olivia and his family. His energy and optimism were above politics, and I know he will be missed by all those who serve here."

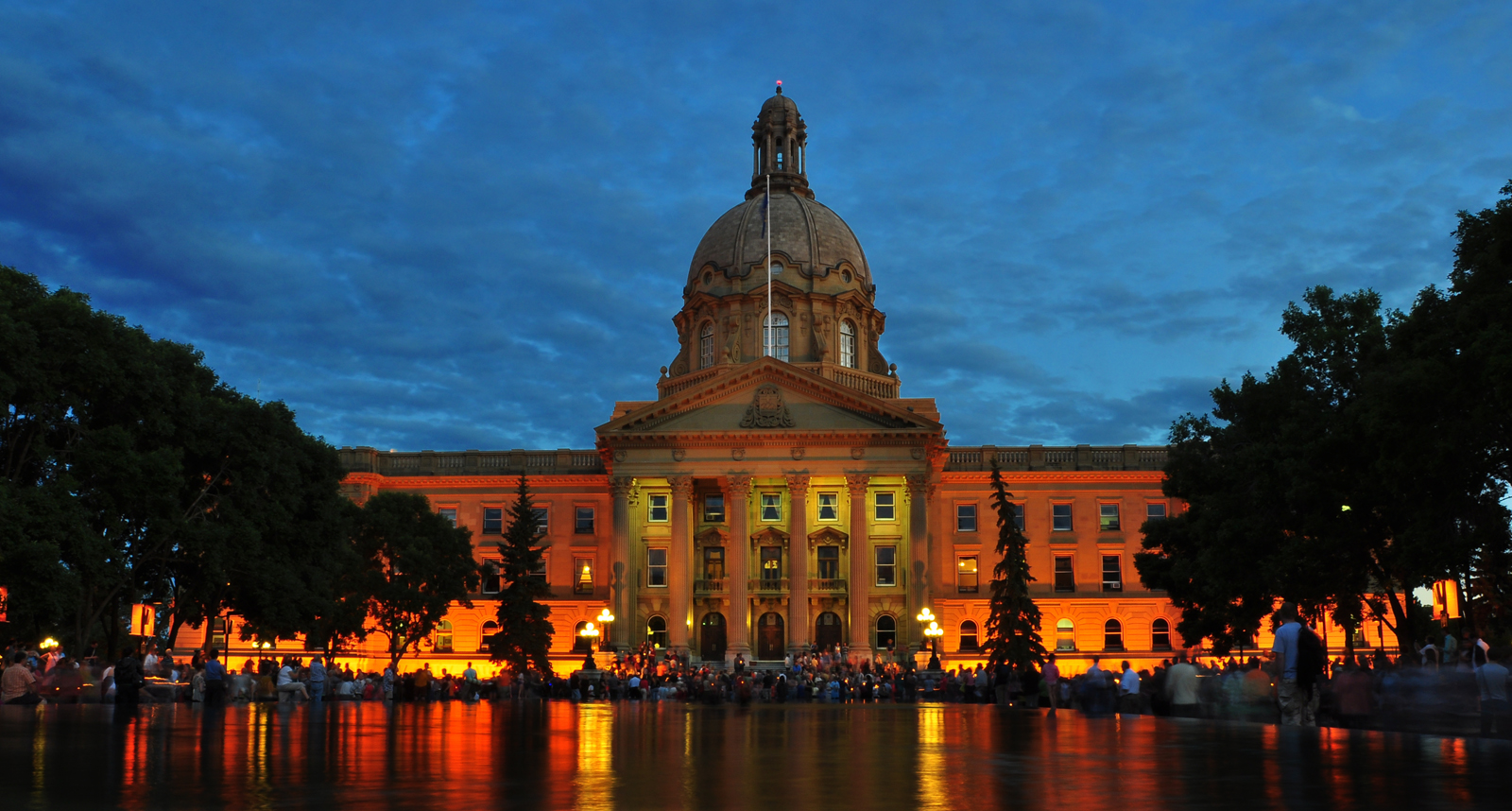
Candlelight vigil for Layton in Edmonton.

In lieu of flowers, the family asked for donations to the Broadbent Institute, an NDP think tank named after Layton's mentor and former NDP leader Ed Broadbent. However, since the Broadbent Institute has not been incorporated and lacks charity status, the donations will go to the NDP, which maintains that these funds will be transferred to the Institute in due course. Donations to political parties come with a 75% tax rebate, compared to 25% for charities registered with the Canada Revenue Agency. Elections Canada warned the NDP that it was skirting the law, forcing the party to make changes on its website regarding the donations. Donors would be informed that the party could not issue a tax receipt, and those wishing to obtain refunds could do so. Following the correction, donations were being directed to the Douglas-Coldwell Foundation, a registered charity.

In June 2012, Toronto City Council voted unanimously to rename the Toronto Island ferries terminal, now the Jack Layton Ferry Terminal, in honour of Layton.

== Posthumous letter ==
Following Layton's death, his family released an open letter, written by Layton two days before his death. In the letter, he expressed his wishes regarding the NDP's leadership in the event of his death, and addressed various segments of the Canadian population. He ended the letter with:

My friends, love is better than anger. Hope is better than fear. Optimism is better than despair. So let us be loving, hopeful and optimistic. And we'll change the world.

== Funeral events ==
=== Lying in state, lying in repose ===
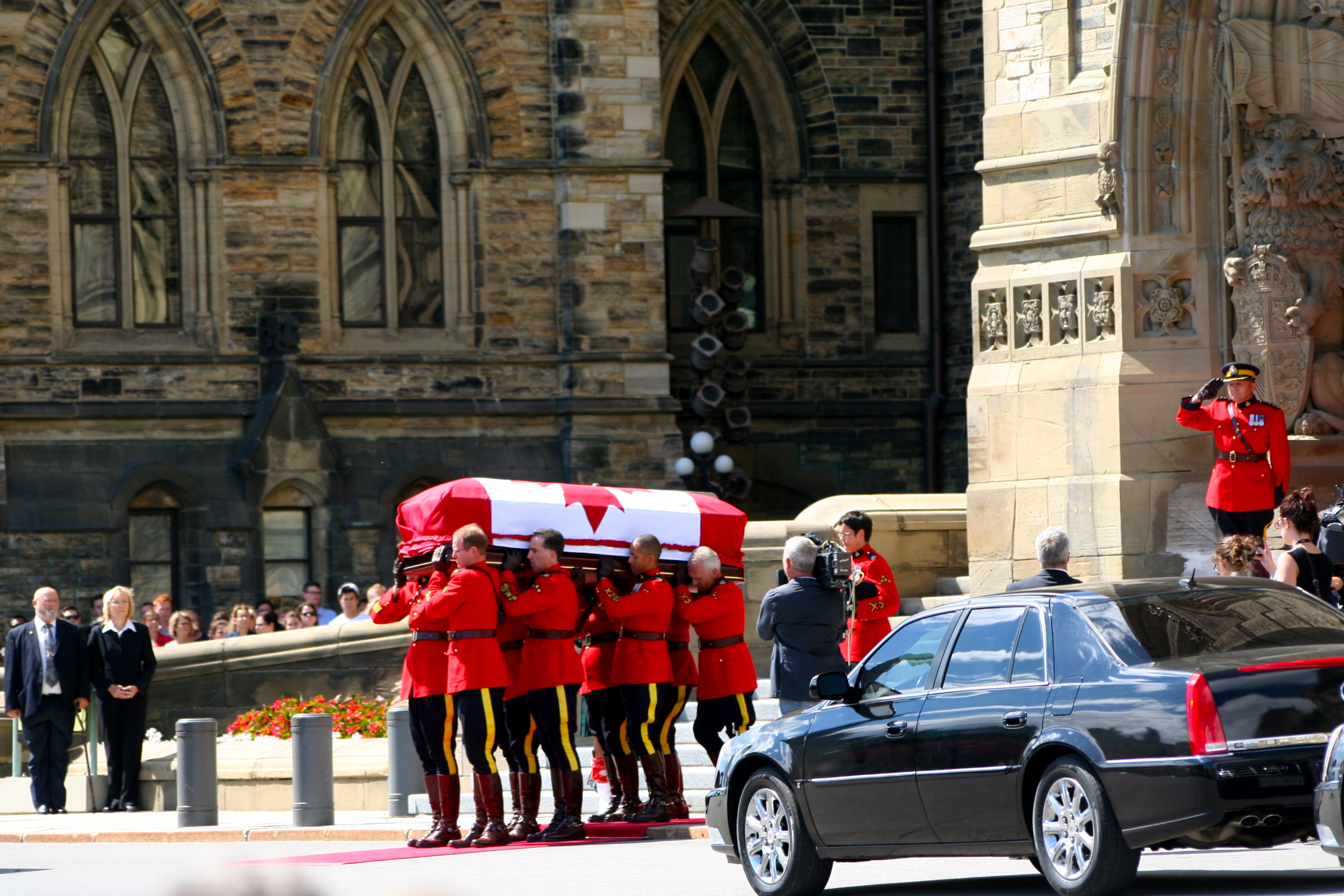
Layton's coffin is taken from parliament hill after lying in state.

In the week before the funeral, Layton's body was laid in state at Parliament Hill at the House of Commons foyer and was open to the public from 12:30 p.m. to 8 p.m. Wednesday and 9 a.m. to 1:30 p.m. Thursday then at Toronto City Hall on Friday 9 a.m. to 8 p.m. and Saturday 9 a.m. to 11 a.m. Four Parliamentary security officers were assigned to flank the casket in Ottawa. The funeral began at 2 p.m. EDT.

=== State funeral service ===
Layton called Brent Hawkes, of the Metropolitan Community Church of Toronto, days before stepping aside as the leader of the NDP, to arrange meetings regarding the procedures of his funeral. Hawkes says that even in private, Layton was still confident he would return, but was preparing for all possibilities including his potential death. Layton asked Hawkes to officiate the service.

The honorary pallbearers were former NDP leaders/MPs Ed Broadbent, Audrey McLaughlin, and Alexa McDonough; Greg Selinger, Premier of Manitoba, and Darrell Dexter, Premier of Nova Scotia; former Manitoba premier and Ambassador of Canada to the United States Gary Doer, and Roy Romanow, former premier of Saskatchewan; Brad Lavigne, Layton's principal secretary while Leader of the Opposition, Bob Gallagher, former chief of staff to Layton, and Jamey Heath, former research and communications director for the NDP; Marilyn Churley, Tim Flannery, Ken Neumann (National Director for Canada, United Steelworkers), Winnie Ng, Joy MacPhail, and Charles Taylor.

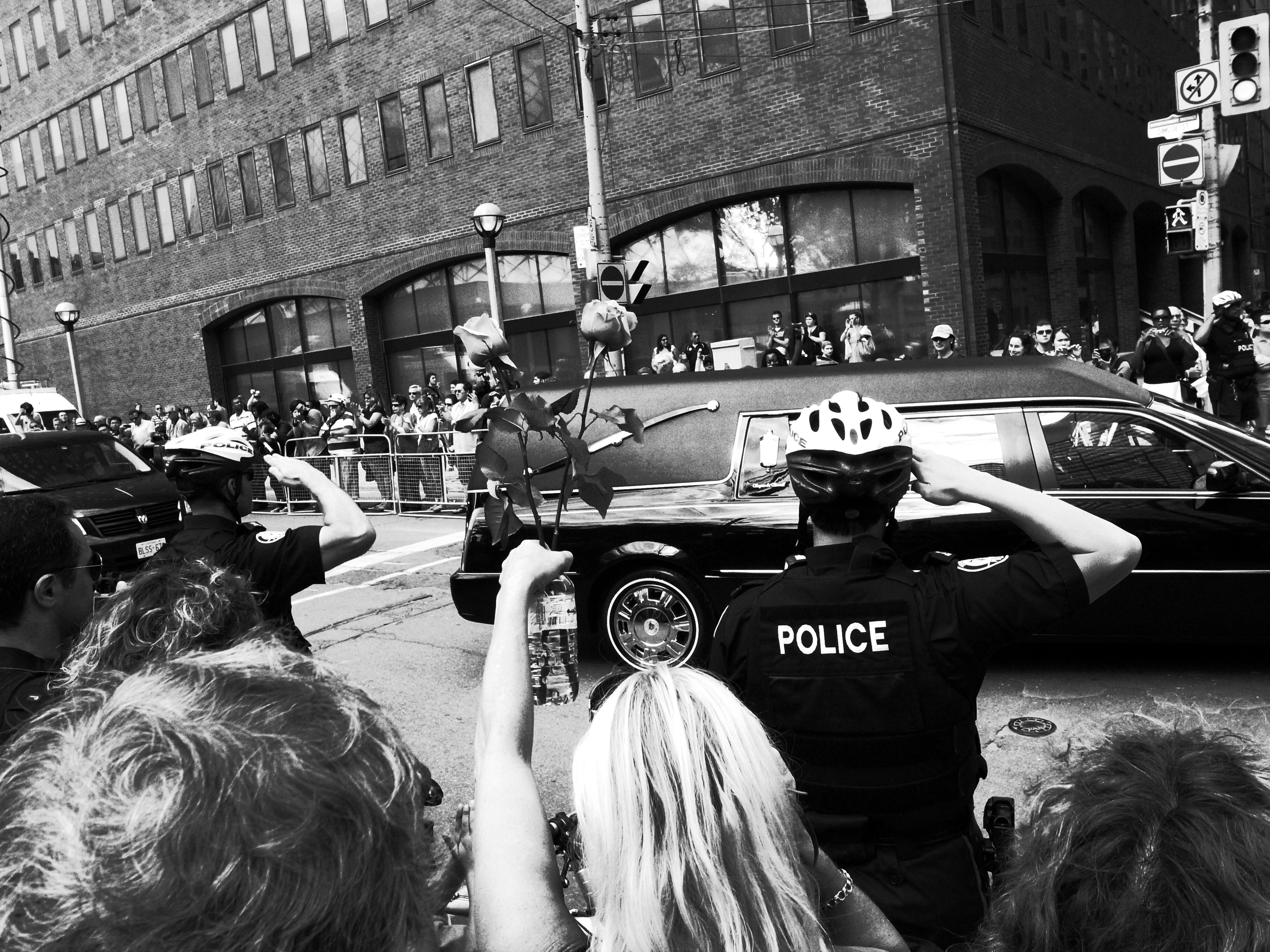
Crowds lined the procession route in Toronto as Layton's casket was taken from City Hall to Roy Thomson Hall

Prior to the formal commencement of the ceremony, the Toronto Symphony Orchestra performed "Pifa" from Handel's Messiah, and jazz musician Richard Underhill performed Van Morrison's "Into the Mystic" and Johann Sebastian Bach's Magnificat.

The choir from the Metropolitan Community Church of Toronto sang the processional as the coffin was carried in, followed by a performance of "O Canada" by singer Joy Klopp and pianist Diane Leah.

Shawn Atleo, the national chief of the Assembly of First Nations, delivered a blessing on behalf of Canada's First Nations community, followed by welcome messages from Hawkes and former New Democratic Party president Anne McGrath.

Passages from a variety of religious traditions were read: a passage from the Bible by Nycole Turmel, a passage from the Torah by Myer Siemiatycki of Ryerson University and a passage from the Quran by Tasleem Riaz of the Asian Communities Council of Canada.

Stephen Lewis, Karl Bélanger, Mike Layton and Sarah Layton delivered the eulogy. Hawkes gave the sermon. Lorraine Segato of The Parachute Club sang "Rise Up", and Martin Deschamps sang his song "Croire". Steven Page, formerly of Barenaked Ladies, sang Leonard Cohen's "Hallelujah"; Page lives in Layton's riding and has performed at NDP benefit concerts in the past. According to CBC News, k.d. lang's recording of "Hallelujah", from her album Hymns of the 49th Parallel, was playing in Layton's room when he died.

At the end of the ceremony, Layton's casket was carried out as jazz singer Julie Michels sang "Get Together". Organist Christopher Dawes performed Oscar Peterson's "Hymn to Freedom" as the congregation left the service.

=== Interment ===
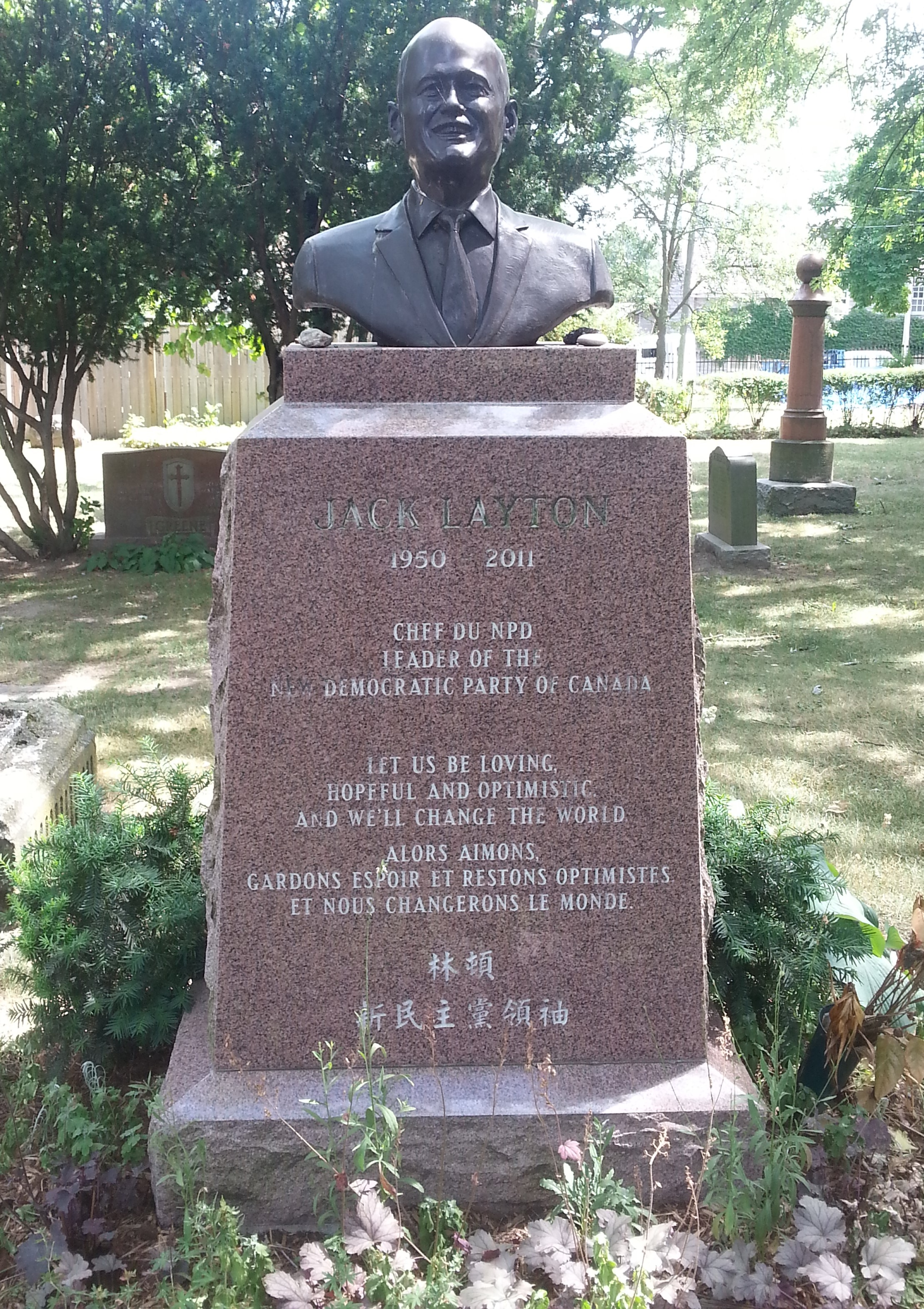
Layton's memorial at Toronto Necropolis

His ashes were scattered in three places, Cote St. Charles United Church in Hudson, Quebec where he was raised, on Toronto Island, where he was married, and at the Toronto Necropolis, near where he lived.

=== Broadcasts ===
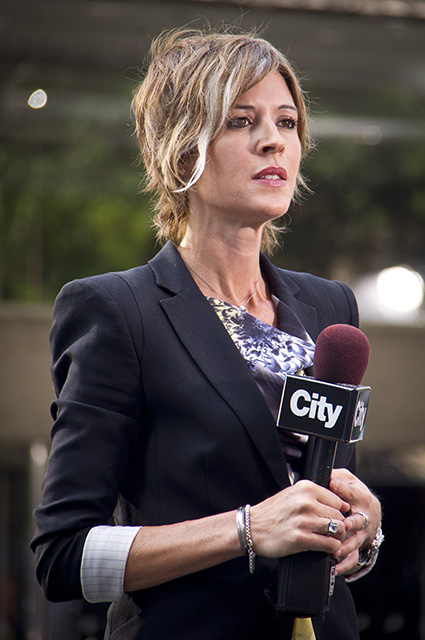
Avery Haines during Citytv's coverage of the funeral. All major Canadian television networks aired the state funeral live.

CP24's Ann Rohmer and Stephen LeDrew anchored live from Nathan Phillips Square on August 26, the day of public visitations at Toronto City Hall. On the day of the funeral, they started their broadcast at 7 am. All of Canada's major television networks aired the ceremony live. Peter Mansbridge hosted coverage on CBC, Lloyd Robertson hosted on CTV, Dawna Friesen hosted on Global, Avery Haines and Francis D'Souza cohosted on Citytv and Céline Galipeau anchored on Radio-Canada. For Robertson, this was his last major television event, as he retired the following week.

CBC Radio One and Première Chaîne also carried the broadcast on radio. Alison Smith and Michael Enright cohosted on Radio One, and Joane Prince hosted on Première Chaîne.

The ceremony was screened live in adjacent Pecaut Square and St. Andrew's Presbyterian Church in Toronto to accommodate overflow crowds not able to be seated in Roy Thomson Hall, as well as in Montreal, Vancouver, Victoria, Quebec City, Saskatoon and other communities.

== Public and media comments ==
The unusually widespread show of public emotion from government, the media, and large numbers of private citizens drew some critical comment. National Post columnist Barbara Kay drew a link between the deaths of Layton and Diana, Princess of Wales, suggesting Harper did not want to come across as detached, as Queen Elizabeth II did. Kay wrote "pre-empted condemnation of his aloofness detachment from human emotion by ordering a state funeral in order to satisfy the teddy-bear grief needs of a nation." Toronto Sun columnist Mike Strobel argued that the grief was over the top, celebrating Layton as a martyr greater in death than life.

However, other columnists such as the National Post's John Moore responded by saying that the public outpouring of sympathy was sincere and the government's gestures were entirely appropriate, given Layton's lifelong contributions in the public interest and the circumstances of his death.

Several activist groups accompanied their condolences of Layton's death by drawing attention to their causes, and a columnist suggested that this posturing could cause cynicism about their public declarations of sympathies.

An Angus Reid Public Opinion survey conducted on August 25 and 26 by representative online panel found that over eight in ten Canadians, including majorities in every region and at least seven in ten Canadians who had voted for other parties in the 2011 election, supported a state funeral for Layton.

== Monuments ==
A month after Layton's death, sculptor Lea Vivot announced that she planned to sculpt and donate three different bronze statues of Layton: one to be located on Parliament Hill, one for Layton's riding of Toronto-Danforth, and one for his home town of Hudson, Quebec. Vivot had previously sculpted a likeness of NDP founder Tommy Douglas for Douglas's hometown of Weyburn, Saskatchewan.

A year following Layton's death, a headstone of Layton was unveiled at the Toronto Necropolis, one of three areas in which his ashes were scattered. The headstone sits atop a piece of Laurentian pink granite, which was brought over from his hometown of Hudson, Quebec.
