= Elizabeth Wettlaufer =

Canadian serial killer and former nurse

- Born: Elizabeth Mae Parker; June 10, 1967 (age 59); Zorra, Ontario, Canada
- Other names: Beth Parker; Betty Weston
- Education: London Baptist Bible College (BA); Conestoga College (RN diploma)
- Spouse: Donnie Wettlaufer (m. 1997; sep. 2007)
- Status: Incarcerated
- Convictions: First degree murder (8 counts); Attempted murder (4 counts); Aggravated assault (2 counts)
- Penalty: Life imprisonment (eligible for parole in 2041)

Details
- Victims: 14 (8 killed, 6 attempted)
- Span of crimes: 2007–2016
- Country: Canada
- Location: Southwestern Ontario
- Target: Elderly patients
- Weapon: Insulin injection
- Date apprehended: October 25, 2016

Elizabeth Tracy Mae "Bethe" Wettlaufer (née Parker; born June 10, 1967) is a convicted Canadian serial killer and former registered nurse who confessed to murdering eight senior citizens and attempting to murder six other people in southwestern Ontario between 2007 and 2016. With a total of 14 victims either killed or injured by her actions, she is described as one of the deadliest serial killers in Canadian history.

== Early life ==
Elizabeth Wettlaufer was born and raised in Zorra Township, a rural community near Woodstock, Ontario. Growing up in a staunchly Baptist household, she went on to earn a bachelor's degree in religious education counseling from London Baptist Bible College after graduating from Huron Park Secondary School in the mid-1980s. Wettlaufer then studied nursing at Conestoga College.

== Career ==
In 2007, Wettlaufer was hired onto the staff at Caressant Care, a long-term care home in Woodstock. She was initially regarded by co-workers as caring and professional. However, throughout her tenure, Wettlaufer struggled with substance abuse and alcoholism. She faced accusations of showing up to work drunk, and at one point was found passed out in the facility's basement during the night shift. Wettlaufer was suspended four times for "medication-related errors", then was finally fired in March 2014 over a "serious" incident in which she gave the wrong medication to a patient.

After leaving Caressant Care, Wettlaufer had difficulty holding down a job. She was hired by the Meadow Park Care Center in London, but lost this job after checking herself into a drug rehab facility in the Niagara Region. She took various temp jobs at other care homes. Wettlaufer admitted to a neighbour that she was fired from one of these jobs for stealing medication, and was fired from another job for making a medication error while high that nearly resulted in the death of a patient. She also wrote poetry about her desire to kill.

== Murders and assaults ==
While she was a nurse at Caressant Care, Wettlaufer began injecting some of the patients she cared for with insulin. In some cases, the amount was not enough to kill the patient; she was charged with, and confessed to, aggravated assault or attempted murder for those cases. Wettlaufer's first assaults occurred sometime between June 25 and December 31, 2007. She confessed that she injected sisters Clotilde Adriano (age 87) and Albina Demedeiros (88) with insulin. While they later died, their deaths were not attributed to Wettlaufer. She confessed to two counts of aggravated assault.

The first case in which Wettlaufer injected a patient with enough insulin to directly cause death was on August 11, 2007, when she murdered James Silcox (84), a World War II veteran and father of six. From 2007 to March 2014, Wettlaufer also murdered the following patients at Caressant Care:

- Maurice "Moe" Granat (84) (2007)
- Gladys Millard (87) (2011)
- Helen Matheson (95) (2011)
- Mary Zurawinski (96) (2011)
- Helen Young (90) (2013)
- Maureen Pickering (79) (2014)

While at Caressant Care, Wettlaufer also injected Michael Priddle (63) and Wayne Hedges (57) "with intent to murder". She confessed to two counts of attempted murder in these cases. She left employment at Caressant Care in 2014, but in part-time work at other facilities and at patients' homes, she injected three more people with insulin:

- Killed Arpad Horvath (75) at Meadow Park facility in London, Ontario
- Injected Sandra Towler (77) "with intent to murder" at a retirement home in Paris, Ontario
- Injected Beverly Bertram (68) "with intent to murder" at a private residence in Ingersoll, Ontario

== Confession, arrest, and conviction ==
Wettlaufer entered an inpatient drug rehabilitation program at the Centre for Addiction and Mental Health (CAMH) in Toronto, on September 16, 2016. There, she confessed to CAMH staff about killing or attempting to kill her patients, leading to CAMH notifying the College of Nurses of Ontario (CNO) and the Toronto Police Service. She then emailed CNO to resign as a registered nurse because she had "deliberately harmed patients in [her] care and [was] now being investigated by the police for same", personally called an investigator from CNO, and had CAMH staff fax a four-page handwritten confession. Wettlaufer had confessed to killing patients several times prior to her confession at CAMH, including to a lawyer who advised her to keep it a secret, and was not reported to police. After providing police with a two-hour-long confession, she was formally charged with the eight murders on October 25. After further investigation, she was also charged with four counts of attempted murder and two counts of aggravated assault on January 13, 2017. Wettlaufer waived her right to a preliminary hearing and confessed to all charges in court on June 1. On June 26, she was sentenced to eight concurrent life terms in prison, with no possibility of parole for 25 years.

In her confession, Wettlaufer admitted that she "knew the difference between right and wrong" but she was visited by "surges" she could not control. She said, "God or the devil or whatever, wanted me to do it." After one murder, she felt "the surging ... And then [heard her own] laughter afterwards, which was really, it was like a cackling from the pit of hell." Wettlaufer told police she had tried to stop killing and she had told friends, a former partner and her pastor what she had done, but no one took her seriously. During the police interview she described the "laughter" not as audible laughter, but as a feeling within her chest (visually using her hands), while the feeling prompting her to overdose and subsequently kill as coming from her stomach region. Wettlaufer never claimed to derive pleasure from the killings, stating that she felt horrible after murdering each victim.

Wettlaufer was held at the Grand Valley Institution for Women in Kitchener, Ontario. In March 2018, she was transferred from Grand Valley to an unspecified secure facility in Montreal to receive medical treatment.

== Responses from government and regulatory bodies ==
=== Provincial government ===
Yasir Naqvi, the Attorney General of Ontario, and Eric Hoskins, the province's Minister of Health and Long-Term Care, jointly announced on the day of Wettlaufer's sentencing that the provincial government would commission a public inquiry into her case. The full details of the inquiry were not given in the announcement, as the government had yet to determine the scope or an individual to lead the inquiry, with Naqvi and Hoskins instead saying that the inquiry would "get the answers we need to help ensure a tragedy such as this does not happen again." The delay in establishing the inquiry was criticized by members of the opposition Progressive Conservative and New Democratic parties toward the end of July 2017, as no progress had seemingly been made since the announcement and the Legislative Assembly had risen for its summer recess.

The Public Inquiry into the Safety and Security of Residents in the Long-Term Care Homes System was formally established by the provincial government on August 1, 2017. Justice Eileen Gillese of the Court of Appeal for Ontario was appointed commissioner of the inquiry. The inquiry was to include interviews with victims' families and public consultations in the community as it investigated the circumstances surrounding the deaths of Wettlaufer's victims and gaps in legislative or policy frameworks that allowed her to continue working as a nurse. The inquiry's lead counsel stated that "anyone from Wettlaufer to Premier Kathleen Wynne" may be called to testify before the inquiry based on the evidence that is uncovered.

After two years, the inquiry concluded with three principal findings and several recommendations, including required training for administrators, directors of nursing, and service organizations, improved screening processes and background checks for new hires, minimizing the use of agency nurses in long-term care homes, improved reporting processes for critical incidents, and changes to certain Ontario provincial regulations.

=== College of Nurses of Ontario ===
Wettlaufer was charged with professional misconduct by a disciplinary panel convened by College of Nurses of Ontario on July 25, 2017. Even though she had already been found guilty in a criminal trial and voluntarily surrendered her nursing license, the formal hearing was required by College to officially bar her from the profession. Wettlaufer declined to participate in the hearing and was found guilty based on court documents from her criminal trial as well as her previous confession. Her conduct was deemed "disgraceful and dishonourable" by the disciplinary panel and her nursing registration was formally revoked indefinitely, barring her from ever practising nursing in Ontario again. The chair of the five-person disciplinary panel that heard Wettlaufer's case said it was "the most egregious and disgraceful conduct this panel has ever considered".

== See also ==
- List of serial killers by country
