= Michael Leshner and Michael Stark =

Canadian same-sex couple

Michael Leshner (born April 8, 1948) and Michael Stark (born 1957 or 1958), also known as The Michaels, are the men who in 2003 entered into the first legal same-sex marriage in Canada. They were consequently named the Canadian Newsmakers of the Year by Time magazine.

== Background ==
Leshner is a lawyer and Jewish, while Stark is a Catholic and a manager involved in graphic design. Leshner was born on April 8, 1948, in Niagara Falls, New York. He then lived in St. Catharines, Ontario and went to Sir Winston Churchill Secondary School. Feeling isolated in small-town Ontario as a homosexual, he went for post-secondary education to the University of Toronto.

In 1992, Leshner, who worked for the Ontario government, made news when he successfully argued before the Ontario Human Rights Tribunal that the provincial government should allow survivor pensions for gay people. He then told the media he believed that private companies should also allow such pensions for homosexuals, or they could be subject to the Ontario Human Rights Commission. Leshner also said, "I'm rather hard on the gay and lesbian community in part because I think there's too much emphasis on why you should feel sorry for yourself. Social change will happen as quickly as you're willing to move it. If it doesn't happen, don't blame [Prime Minister Brian] Mulroney."

The 1992 decision led the Ontario New Democratic Party government of Bob Rae to introduce the Equality Rights Statute Amendment Act (Bill 167) in 1994, although the bill failed on third reading amid controversy.

== Marriage ==
When Leshner heard of colleagues' plans to try to legalize same-sex civil marriage, he persuaded Stark to get married so the two could start the case. Leshner considered himself to have been in a common law marriage with Stark for 22 years. After the ruling by a lower Ontario court, Leshner proposed to Stark in front of reporters. The marriage then occurred after the decision Halpern v. Canada (Attorney General) by the Court of Appeal for Ontario deciding homosexuals should be allowed to marry. The Michaels afterwards became well known in their city Toronto, and appeared in the 2003 gay pride parade. The two even made international news. Paul Boddum, a Canadian artist profiled in the National Post for his work based on dogs, made a portrait called "Schmikey the Schnauzer" for Leshner and Stark as a wedding present. The National Post said this was "Boddum's most famous commission to date."

Time selected the couple as Newsmakers of the Year as an emblem of "the year that Canada rethought what was taboo," referring to other events such as the loosening of marijuana laws. Leshner replied that "I really feel like we're Canada's new Mary Pickford... we are Canada's sweethearts... What better human rights story to send around the world that says Canada loves the Michaels, and for the rest of the world to wonder, what on earth is going on in Canada?" However, some Canadians have been critical of Leshner and Stark, and wrote to newspapers calling them a "sick aberration," while other Canadians did defend them. One paper called this an "apt reflection of public opinion polls" indicating Canadians were divided on whether same-sex marriage should be allowed.

The Globe and Mail, in choosing the "Nation Builders of the year," did not select Leshner and Stark. However, they did select the judges involved in the case, namely Chief Justice Roy McMurtry, Eileen Gillese and James MacPherson.

== Afterwards ==
In 2003, Bishop Jean-Louis Plouffe argued that future-Prime Minister Paul Martin would not be truly Catholic if his government recognized same-sex marriage. At around the same time, Bishop Fred Henry said then-Prime Minister Jean Chrétien may go to hell for recognizing such marriages. Leshner responded to these arguments, which he called "religious intolerance," by saying "I think the bishop has eaten too much mad cow... The Charter of Rights trumps the Bible." In 2004, Leshner wrote a column in the Toronto Star speaking out against Conservative leader Stephen Harper in the 2004 federal election. Leshner expressed fear that Harper would use the notwithstanding clause to overrule gay rights in the Canadian Charter of Rights and Freedoms. Leshner said that "I am beginning to feel like a Jew in Germany in the early 1930s."

Also in 2004, the Supreme Court of Canada listed Leshner and Stark among the intervenors in the case Re Same-Sex Marriage, which found that the federal government could establish same-sex marriage. Following the decision, the press noted Leshner and Stark took part in celebrations. Leshner publicly commented in reference to Alberta Premier Ralph Klein, who Leshner perceived as having been defeated by the ruling, "Ralph, I'm 56-years-old and I can now say: 'Nyah-nyah-nyah-nyah-na-na.'"

== See also ==
- Michael Hendricks and René Leboeuf
- Same-sex marriage in Ontario
