= Eileen E. Gillese =

Canadian judge

The Honourable Eileen E. Gillese

Justice of the Court of Appeal for Ontario
- Incumbent
- Assumed office 5 January 2002
- Nominated by: Jean Chrétien
- Appointed by: Adrienne Clarkson

Personal details
- Born: Edmonton, Alberta
- Spouse: Robert Badun
- Children: 4
- Education: University of Alberta; Oxford University
- Occupation: Judge

Eileen E. Gillese is a justice of the Court of Appeal for Ontario. She is a graduate of the University of Alberta and Oxford University. Before her appointment to the Court of Appeal, Gillese was a judge of the Ontario Superior Court of Justice.

Gillese earned a Commerce degree at the University of Alberta in 1977, then won a Rhodes Scholarship, which had just opened up to women, and studied law at Wadham College, Oxford, earning a BA Hons. Jurisprudence and a Bachelor of Civil Law.

Before her judicial appointments Gillese articled and practised in Edmonton, then was Dean and Professor of Law of the Faculty of Law, the University of Western Ontario (1983–1999).

Gillese was appointed commissioner of the Public Inquiry into the Safety and Security of Residents in the Long-Term Care Homes System by the Government of Ontario on August 1, 2017. The inquiry was established to investigate the circumstances surrounding serial killer nurse Elizabeth Wettlaufer's crimes and gaps in legislative or policy frameworks that allowed Wettlaufer to continue working as a nurse even after other serious workplace problems became apparent.

Gillese served as the second chancellor of Brescia University College from 2015 until 2019.

She holds honorary LLD Degrees from the Law Society of Upper Canada and from the University of Alberta.
