= Metropolitan Community Church of Toronto =

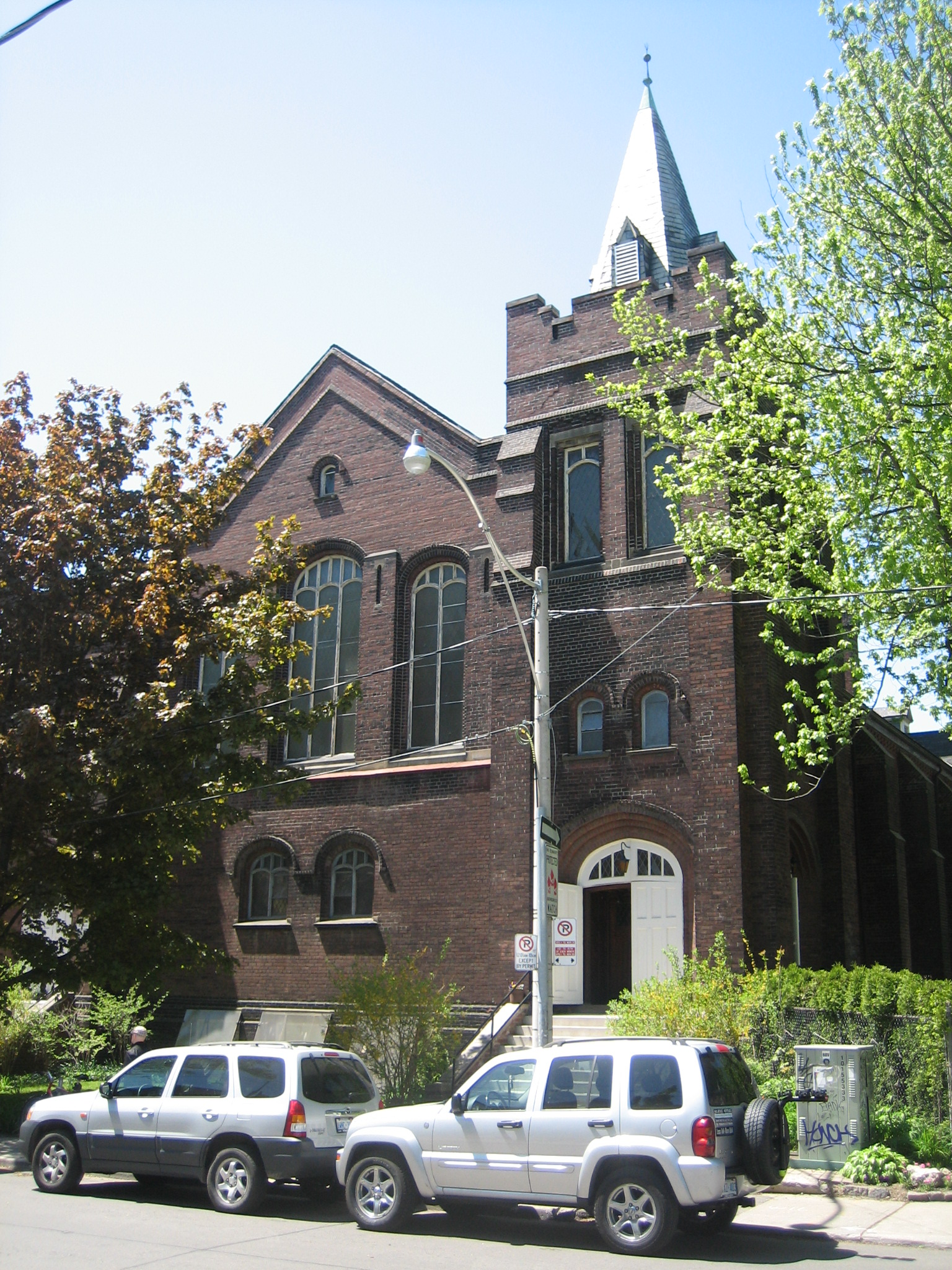
- Metropolitan Community Church of Toronto
- 43.667148°N 79.347644°W
- Location: Toronto, Ontario, Canada
- Denomination: Metropolitan Community Church
- Website: www.mcctoronto.com

History
- Founded: July 17, 1973

Clergy
- Pastor(s): Rev. Bob Wolfe (1973–1978); Rev. Dr. Brent Hawkes (1978–2017); Rev. Jeff Rock (2017–2023); Rev. Deana Dudley, 2023–present)

The Metropolitan Community Church of Toronto is a congregation of the worldwide Metropolitan Community Church movement located in Toronto, Ontario, Canada, and is a welcoming congregation openly affirming lesbian, gay, bisexual, heterosexual and transgender people. MCC Toronto was instrumental in changing the law on same sex marriage in Ontario, when two same-sex marriage ceremonies performed at the church on January 14, 2001, initiated the process leading to the Halpern v Canada (AG) decision of 2003.

MCC Toronto is now the largest Metropolitan Community Church congregation in terms of membership. On Christmas Eve and during Pride Toronto, the church holds services at special venues, as the popularity of the events exceed's the church building's capacity. The Christmas service is held at Roy Thomson Hall, while the Pride service is held on Church Street in the heart of the Church and Wellesley village.

== History ==
In 1973, a group of individuals wrote to the head office of the Metropolitan Community Church in Los Angeles requesting that they send someone to Toronto to start a new church. In July 1973, Rev. Bob Wolfe arrived in the city and the first worship service was held with 12 people on July 17, 1973. Rev. Wolfe, who died in July 2005, worked hard to establish the new congregation. He became best known for talking a suicidal young gay man down from the roof of Toronto City Hall, and used the ceremony where he was honoured by the city to lambaste politicians for failing to reform anti-gay laws.

In the early years, worship services were held at the Church of the Holy Trinity.

In 1978, Rev. Brent Hawkes succeeded Rev. Wolfe as pastor.

In 1985, the church bought its first church building, at 2029 Gerrard Street East. This was the first property owned in Canada by a lesbian and gay organization.

Responding to the AIDS crisis, MCC Toronto hired a full-time person to co-ordinate its AIDSCARE program in 1990. Since then its volunteers have provided home hospice care for hundreds of individuals. MCC Toronto have facilitated support groups for HIV, AIDS and other health issues. In 1997, the Church expanded the AIDSCARE program to CommunityCARE and now provides support for clients with a range of illnesses and requirements.

In 1991, the church moved to its present location at 115 Simpson Avenue, a building that had been occupied by Simpson Avenue United Church.

In 2011, the church received a $1 million donation from philanthropists Margaret and Wallace McCain, the largest single donation ever received by an MCC congregation in the world.

While the church has not held any state funerals, Rev. Hawkes was the officiant at the state funeral of Jack Layton at Roy Thomson Hall on August 27, 2011.

On July 9, 2017, voting members of the congregation voted to elect Rev. Jeff Rock as new senior pastor. Rock took over the congregation as of October 1, following Hawkes's retirement.

In January, 2024, Rev. Deana Dudley was installed as MCC Toronto's fifth senior pastor. Dudley had previously served as pastor of Christos MCC in Toronto and the MCC congregation in London, Ontario. She joined MCC Toronto's staff as assistant pastor in 2009.

== Beliefs ==
=== LGBT issues ===
MCC Toronto has assisted with the founding of other gay and lesbian groups. It helped organize the first PFLAG meeting and paid for the telephone line in their first year of operation. The church has provided office space for various community groups, such as the Toronto Counselling Centre for Lesbians and Gays, Lesbian & Gay Youth Toronto, and the Coalition for Lesbian and Gay Rights in Ontario.

The MCC was also the first organization ever to organize a parade float in Toronto's Pride parade.

The congregation has continually supported equality for sexual minorities. This support has included significant legislation: in 1986, they supported Bill 7, adding sexual orientation to the Ontario Human Rights Code; in 1994, they supported Bill 167, which would have changed the definition of "spouse" in Ontario; in 1996, there were intervenors in the Supreme Court of Canada case of Egan v Canada in the constitutional question of same-sex spousal recognition under the Old Age Security Act, which resulted in rights of gay and lesbian couples being recognized and sexual orientation being read into the Charter of Rights and Freedoms; in 1999, Rev. Hawkes testified in M. v. H. on spousal support provisions in family law, which held that same-sex couples receive equitable treatment under the constitution.

=== Marriage ===
In the fall of 2000, MCC Toronto began working for the legalization of same-sex marriage in Canada. The church's lawyers developed a strategy that was built on a combination of the Ontario Marriage Act and the Canadian Charter of Rights and Freedoms. On January 14, 2001, Rev. Hawkes married two same-sex couples. But the Registrar General of Ontario refused to register the marriage documents. The church took the provincial government to court and the case was heard in November 2001. On July 12, 2002, the Superior Court ruled that marriage rights must be extended to same-sex couples, but it suspended the ruling for a period of two years to permit the Legislative Assembly of Ontario time to comply with the ruling through the legislative process. The Ontario Court of Appeal handed down its ruling on June 10, 2003. The unanimous Court found that the exclusion of same-sex couples was a clear violation of the Charter and moreover did not constitute a "reasonable infringement" under section 1. In this respect the judgment followed much of what had been ruled elsewhere. The court also held that there was to be no suspension of the remedy as it applied to the general population, and that the new definition allowing same-sex couples to marry would take effect immediately.

Hawkes served as the grand marshal of the WorldPride parade in 2014.

== See also ==
- LGBT-welcoming church programs
