= Members of the 38th Canadian Parliament and same-sex marriage =

Votes of elected represtantatives on Canadian same-sex marriage legislation

This article lists the members of the 38th Parliament of Canada and how they voted on the Civil Marriage Act (Bill C-38), which amended the Marriage Act of Canada to recognize same-sex marriage. The legislation was later challenged in the 39th Canadian Parliament.

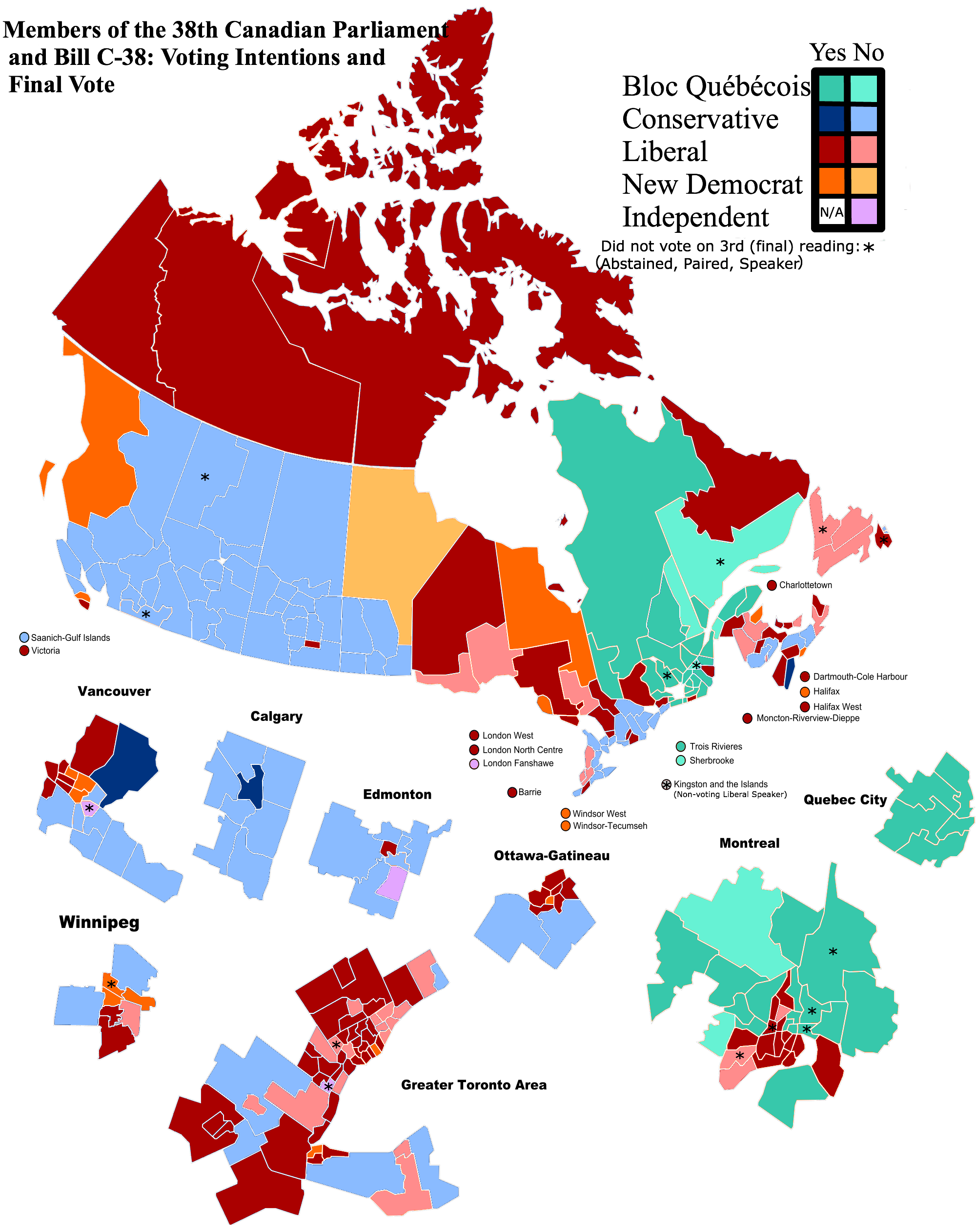
Result of parliamentary vote on the third and final reading of Bill C-38, legalizing same-sex marriage across Canada.

== Votes ==
House of Commons

Group	For	Against	Absent	Total
Liberal cabinet	36	0	1	37
Liberal backbench	59	32	4	95
Conservatives	3	93	2	98
Bloc Québécois	43	5	6	54
NDP	17	1	1	19
Independents	0	2	2	4
Totals	158	133	16	307

- This tally does not include the Speaker, who only votes in the House if there is a tie.

Up to 154 votes were needed to ensure the legislation passes, although the only formal requirement for passing legislation is the assent of a majority of members in attendance for the vote.

Senate

Group	For	Against	Abstain	Absent	Total
Liberals	41	5	2	14	62
Conservatives	1	15	1	5	22
Independents	2	1	0	2	5
Progressive Conservatives	2	0	0	3	5
Independent NDP	1	0	0	0	1
Totals	47	21	3	24	95

- For the purposes of this table, the Speaker of the Senate, who did not vote, is counted as an absentee since the official Senate tabulation does not list him as an abstainer.

== Background ==
The Globe and Mail's analysis on December 13, 2004 placed the upper limit of opposed votes at 142.

Most of the Liberal cabinet, the Bloc Québécois (BQ) and the New Democratic Party (NDP) voted in favour of the Bill, while most of the Conservative Party members were against it. In the Liberal backbench, about 2/3 of members voted in favour.

On April 12, 2005, a vote was held on an amendment to Bill C-38 proposed by the Leader of the Opposition, Stephen Harper. The amendment would have stopped C-38 from advancing and maintained the "traditional" definition of marriage. The proposed amendment was defeated by a vote of 164 to 132. Ten MPs were absent, including 5 BQ MPs who reportedly oppose the bill. Certain MPs who had previously not declared their positions on the issue revealed their stands on the bill in this vote. All of these voted against the amendment, and therefore can be assumed to be in favour of same-sex marriage. Liberal MP Joe Comuzzi, who months prior to the vote mused about resigning his post as Minister of State, voted against the amendment because "it was a Conservative motion".

A vote-in-principle was expected around April 19, but Conservatives stalled the bill by bringing up more MPs to speak on the issue. The 2nd reading vote came up on a recorded division, and passed 164–137. The rise in votes for the opposition came from several Bloc MPs who were absent for Harper's amendment, but present for the 2nd reading vote.

Bill C-38 entered Report Stage on June 16, 2005. After exiting committee, the Government agreed to amendments to the bill that will further protect religious officials who do not wish to perform same-sex marriages, and to protect charitable organizations from losing their tax status.

The third reading vote on that bill in the House was expected the final week of June, after the House adopted a motion (supported by the Liberals, Bloc Québécois, and NDP) to extend the sitting of the house. Bill C-48 passed just before midnight on June 23, 2005 when the Liberals agreed with the Bloc and NDP to force a snap vote on the bill. The snap vote on C-48 was significant because if all Conservative MPs were present for the vote, and if all Bloc opposed, and the Independents voted as they usually did, the Government would have been defeated.

== House of Commons ==
=== Liberal Cabinet ===
As per the principle of cabinet solidarity, all cabinet ministers were expected to vote in favour of government-introduced legislation. While backbench MPs in 2003, six future cabinet ministers voted in favour of a Canadian Alliance motion defining marriage in exclusively traditional terms. Joe Comuzzi decided to leave cabinet in order to vote against SSM. John Efford, a cabinet minister who recently opposed SSM decided to vote in favour of C-38. Former Liberal MP Pat O'Brien said he was personally told by six ministers that they may leave the cabinet rather than support SSM legislation, but this did not happen. Stephen Harper has pressured Paul Martin to allow his cabinet members a free vote, citing the precedent of Brian Mulroney in a capital punishment vote in 1988.

Name	2003 Alliance motion	Harper amend.	2nd reading	3rd reading	Riding
Reg Alcock	No	No	Yes	Yes	Winnipeg South, MB
Mauril Bélanger	No	No	Yes	Yes	Ottawa—Vanier, ON
Carolyn Bennett	No	No	Yes	Yes	St. Paul's, ON
Ethel Blondin-Andrew	No	No	Yes	Yes	Western Arctic, NT
Claudette Bradshaw	No	No	Yes	Yes	Moncton—Riverview—Dieppe, NB
Scott Brison	No	No	Yes	Yes	Kings—Hants, NS
Aileen Carroll	Absent	No	Yes	Yes	Barrie, ON
Raymond Chan	—N/a	No	Yes	Yes	Richmond, BC
Irwin Cotler	Absent	No	Yes	Yes	Mount Royal, QC
Stéphane Dion	No	No	Yes	Yes	Saint-Laurent—Cartierville, QC
Ujjal Dosanjh	—N/a	No	Yes	Yes	Vancouver South, BC
Ken Dryden	—N/a	No	Yes	Yes	York Centre, ON
John Efford	Yes	No	Yes	Absent	Avalon, NL
David Emerson	—N/a	No	Yes	Yes	Vancouver Kingsway, BC
Joe Fontana	Yes	No	Yes	Yes	London North Centre, ON
Liza Frulla	No	No	Yes	Yes	Jeanne-Le Ber, QC
John Godfrey	No	No	Yes	Yes	Don Valley West, ON
Ralph Goodale	No	No	Yes	Yes	Wascana, SK
Bill Graham	No	No	Yes	Yes	Toronto Centre, ON
Albina Guarnieri	Yes	No	Yes	Yes	Mississauga East—Cooksville, ON
Tony Ianno	No	No	Yes	Yes	Trinity—Spadina, ON
Jean Lapierre	—N/a	No	Yes	Yes	Outremont, QC
Paul Martin	No	No	Yes	Yes	LaSalle—Émard, QC
John McCallum	No	No	Yes	Yes	Markham—Unionville, ON
Joe McGuire	Yes	No	Yes	Yes	Egmont, PE
Anne McLellan	No	No	Yes	Yes	Edmonton Centre, AB
Andy Mitchell	No	No	Yes	Yes	Parry Sound-Muskoka, ON
Stephen Owen	Absent	No	Yes	Yes	Vancouver Quadra, BC
Jim Peterson	No	No	Yes	Yes	Willowdale, ON
Pierre Pettigrew	No	No	Yes	Yes	Papineau, QC
Geoff Regan	No	No	Yes	Yes	Halifax West, NS
Lucienne Robillard	No	No	Yes	Yes	Westmount—Ville-Marie, QC
Jacques Saada	No	No	Yes	Yes	Brossard—La Prairie, QC
Andy Scott	No	No	Yes	Yes	Fredericton, NB
Belinda Stronach	—N/a	No	Yes	Yes	Newmarket—Aurora, ON
Tony Valeri	Absent	No	Yes	Yes	Hamilton East—Stoney Creek, ON
Joe Volpe	Yes	No	Yes	Yes	Eglinton—Lawrence, ON

=== Liberal backbench ===
At the Liberal biennial convention in March, delegates overwhelmingly approved same-sex marriage as a matter of party policy. Paul Martin allowed his caucus a free vote.

Name	2003 Alliance motion	Harper amend.	2nd reading	3rd reading	Riding
Peter Adams	No	No	Yes	Yes	Peterborough, ON
David Anderson	No	No	Yes	Yes	Victoria, BC
Jean Augustine	No	No	Yes	Yes	Etobicoke—Lakeshore, ON
Larry Bagnell	No	No	Yes	Yes	Yukon, YT
Navdeep Bains	—N/a	No	Yes	Yes	Mississauga—Brampton South, ON
Eleni Bakopanos	Absent	No	Yes	Absent	Ahuntsic, QC
Sue Barnes	No	No	Yes	Yes	London West, ON
Colleen Beaumier	No	No	Yes	Yes	Brampton West, ON
Don Bell	—N/a	No	Yes	Yes	North Vancouver, BC
Maurizio Bevilacqua	No	No	Yes	Yes	Vaughan, ON
Françoise Boivin	—N/a	No	Yes	Yes	Gatineau, QC
Ray Bonin	Yes	Yes	No	No	Nickel Belt, ON
Ken Boshcoff	—N/a	Yes	No	No	Thunder Bay—Rainy River, ON
Don Boudria	No	No	Yes	Yes	Glengarry—Prescott—Russell, ON
Bonnie Brown	No	No	Yes	Yes	Oakville, ON
Sarmite Bulte	No	No	Yes	Yes	Parkdale—High Park, ON
Gerry Byrne	No	Yes	No	Absent	Humber—St. Barbe—Baie Verte, NL
John Cannis	Yes	Yes	No	No	Scarborough Centre, ON
Gary Carr	—N/a	Yes	No	No	Halton, ON
Marlene Catterall	No	No	Yes	Yes	Ottawa West—Nepean, ON
Brenda Chamberlain	Yes	Yes	No	No	Guelph, ON
Denis Coderre	No	No	Yes	Yes	Bourassa, QC
Joe Comuzzi	Absent	No	Yes	No	Thunder Bay—Superior North, ON
Roy Cullen	No	Yes	No	Paired	Etobicoke North, ON
Rodger Cuzner	No	Yes	No	No	Cape Breton—Canso, NS
Jean-Claude D'Amours	—N/a	No	Yes	Yes	Madawaska—Restigouche, NB
Paul DeVillers	No	No	Yes	Yes	Simcoe North, ON
Ruby Dhalla	—N/a	No	Yes	Yes	Brampton—Springdale, ON
Claude Drouin	No	No	Yes	Yes	Beauce, QC
Wayne Easter	No	No	Yes	Yes	Malpeque, PE
Mark Eyking	Yes	No	Yes	Yes	Sydney—Victoria, NS
Raymonde Folco	No	Absent	Yes	Yes	Laval—Les Îles, QC
Hedy Fry	No	No	Yes	Yes	Vancouver Centre, BC
Roger Gallaway	Absent	Yes	No	No	Sarnia—Lambton, ON
Marc Godbout	—N/a	No	Yes	Yes	Ottawa—Orléans, ON
Mark Holland	—N/a	No	Yes	Yes	Ajax—Pickering, ON
Charles Hubbard	Yes	Yes	No	No	Miramichi, NB
Marlene Jennings	No	No	Yes	Yes	Notre-Dame-de-Grâce—Lachine, QC
Susan Kadis	—N/a	No	Yes	Yes	Thornhill, ON
Nancy Karetak-Lindell	No	No	Yes	Yes	Nunavut, NU
Jim Karygiannis	Yes	Yes	No	No	Scarborough—Agincourt, ON
Wajid Khan	—N/a	Yes	No	No	Mississauga—Streetsville, ON
Walt Lastewka	Yes	Yes	No	No	St. Catharines, ON
Dominic LeBlanc	N	N	Yes	Yes	Beauséjour, NB
Derek Lee	Yes	Yes	No	No	Scarborough—Rouge River, ON
Judi Longfield	Yes	Yes	No	No	Whitby—Oshawa, ON
Lawrence MacAulay	Absent	Yes	No	No	Cardigan, PE
Paul Macklin	No	No	Yes	Yes	Northumberland—Quinte West, ON
Gurbax Malhi	Yes	Yes	No	No	Bramalea—Gore—Malton, ON
John Maloney	Yes	Yes	No	No	Welland, ON
Diane Marleau	No	No	Yes	Yes	Sudbury, ON
Keith Martin	Yes	No	Yes	Yes	Esquimalt—Juan de Fuca, BC
Bill Matthews	Absent	Yes	No	No	Random—Burin—St. George's, NL
David McGuinty	—N/a	No	Yes	Yes	Ottawa South, ON
John McKay	Yes	Yes	No	No	Scarborough-Guildwood, ON
Dan McTeague	Yes	Yes	No	No	Pickering—Scarborough East, ON
Maria Minna	No	No	Yes	Yes	Beaches—East York, ON
Shawn Murphy	Yes	No	Yes	Yes	Charlottetown, PE
Lynn Myers	Absent	No	Yes	Yes	Kitchener—Conestoga, ON
Anita Neville	No	No	Yes	Yes	Winnipeg South Centre, MB
Massimo Pacetti	Absent	Yes	No	No	Saint-Léonard—Saint-Michel, QC
Denis Paradis	No	No	Yes	Yes	Brome—Missisquoi, QC
Bernard Patry	No	No	No	Paired	Pierrefonds—Dollard, QC
Beth Phinney	No	No	Yes	Yes	Hamilton Mountain, ON
Jerry Pickard	Yes	No	Yes	Yes	Chatham-Kent—Essex, ON
Russ Powers	—N/a	No	Yes	Yes	Ancaster—Dundas—Flam.—Westdale, ON
Marcel Proulx	No	Absent	Absent	Yes	Hull—Aylmer, QC
Yasmin Ratansi	—N/a	No	Yes	Yes	Don Valley East, ON
Karen Redman	No	No	Yes	Yes	Kitchener Centre, ON
Pablo Rodriguez	—N/a	No	Yes	Yes	Honoré—Mercier, QC
Anthony Rota	—N/a	No	Yes	Yes	Nipissing—Timiskaming, ON
Todd Russell	—N/a	—N/a	—N/a	Yes	Labrador, NL
Michael Savage	—N/a	No	Yes	Yes	Dartmouth—Cole Harbour, NS
Andy Savoy	Yes	Yes	No	No	Tobique—Mactaquac, NB
Francis Scarpaleggia	—N/a	Yes	No	No	Lac-Saint-Louis, QC
Judy Sgro	Yes	No	Yes	Yes	York West, ON
Mario Silva	—N/a	No	Yes	Yes	Davenport, ON
Raymond Simard	No	Yes	No	No	Saint Boniface, MB
Scott Simms	—N/a	Yes	No	No	Bonavista—Gander—Grand Falls—Windsor, NL
David Smith	—N/a	No	Yes	Yes	Pontiac, QC
Lloyd St. Amand	—N/a	No	Yes	Yes	Brant, ON
Brent St. Denis	No	No	Yes	Yes	Algoma—Manitoulin—Kapuskasing, ON
Paul Steckle	Yes	Yes	No	No	Huron—Bruce, ON
Paul Szabo	Yes	Yes	No	No	Mississauga South, ON
Andrew Telegdi	No	No	Yes	Yes	Kitchener—Waterloo, ON
Lui Temelkovski	—N/a	No	Yes	Yes	Oak Ridges—Markham, ON
Robert G. Thibault	No	No	Yes	Yes	West Nova, NS
Alan Tonks	Yes	Yes	No	No	York South—Weston, ON
Paddy Torsney	Absent	No	Yes	Yes	Burlington, ON
Rose-Marie Ur	Yes	Yes	No	No	Lambton—Kent—Middlesex, ON
Roger Valley	—N/a	No	Yes	Yes	Kenora, ON
Tom Wappel	Yes	Yes	No	No	Scarborough Southwest, ON
Bryon Wilfert	Yes	Yes	No	No	Richmond Hill, ON
Borys Wrzesnewskyj	—N/a	No	Yes	Yes	Etobicoke Centre, ON
Paul Zed	—N/a	Paired	No	No	Saint John, NB

=== Conservatives ===
At the Conservative convention, delegates overwhelmingly approved the definition of marriage as only being between one man and one woman as a matter of party policy with 74% in favour, and 26% opposed. Stephen Harper allowed his caucus a free vote.

Name	2003 Alliance motion	Harper amend.	2nd reading	3rd reading	Riding
Jim Abbott	Yes	Yes	No	No	Kootenay—Columbia, BC
Diane Ablonczy	Yes	Yes	No	No	Calgary—Nose Hill, AB
Dean Allison	—N/a	Yes	No	No	Niagara West—Glanbrook, ON
Rona Ambrose	—N/a	Yes	No	No	Edmonton—Spruce Grove, AB
Rob Anders	Yes	Yes	No	No	Calgary West, AB
David L. Anderson	Yes	Yes	No	No	Cypress Hills—Grasslands, SK
Dave Batters	—N/a	Yes	No	No	Palliser, SK
Leon Benoit	Yes	Yes	No	No	Vegreville—Wainwright, AB
James Bezan	—N/a	Yes	No	No	Selkirk—Interlake, MB
Garry Breitkreuz	Yes	Yes	No	No	Yorkton—Melville, SK
Gord Brown	—N/a	Yes	No	No	Leeds—Grenville, ON
Colin Carrie	—N/a	Yes	No	No	Oshawa, ON
Bill Casey	Yes	Yes	No	No	Cumberland—Colchester—Musquodoboit Valley, NS
Rick Casson	Yes	Yes	No	No	Lethbridge, AB
David Chatters	Yes	Yes	Absent	No	Westlock--St. Paul, AB
Mike Chong	—N/a	Yes	No	No	Wellington—Halton Hills, ON
John Cummins	Yes	Yes	No	No	Delta—Richmond East, BC
Stockwell Day	Yes	Yes	No	No	Okanagan—Coquihalla, BC
Barry Devolin	—N/a	Yes	No	No	Haliburton—Kawartha Lakes—Brock, ON
Norman Doyle	Yes	Yes	No	No	St. John's East, NL
John Duncan	Yes	Yes	No	No	Vancouver Island North, BC
Ken Epp	Yes	Yes	No	No	Edmonton—Sherwood Park, AB
Diane Finley	—N/a	Yes	No	No	Haldimand—Norfolk, ON
Brian Fitzpatrick	Yes	Yes	No	No	Prince Albert, SK
Steven Fletcher	—N/a	Yes	No	No	Charleswood—St. James—Assiniboia, MB
Paul Forseth	Yes	Yes	No	No	New Westminster—Coquitlam, BC
Cheryl Gallant	Yes	Yes	No	No	Renfrew—Nipissing—Pembroke, ON
Peter Goldring	Yes	Yes	No	No	Edmonton East, AB
Gary Goodyear	—N/a	Yes	No	No	Cambridge, ON
Jim Gouk	Yes	Yes	No	Absent	British Columbia Southern Interior, BC
Gurmant Grewal	Yes	Yes	No	No	Newton—North Delta, BC
Nina Grewal	—N/a	Yes	No	No	Fleetwood—Port Kells, BC
Helena Guergis	—N/a	Yes	No	No	Simcoe—Grey, ON
Art Hanger	Yes	Yes	No	No	Calgary Northeast, AB
Stephen Harper	Yes	Yes	No	No	Calgary Southwest, AB
Richard Harris	Yes	Yes	No	No	Cariboo—Prince George, BC
Jeremy Harrison	—N/a	Yes	No	No	Desnethé—Missinippi—Churchill River, SK
Loyola Hearn	Absent	Yes	No	No	St. John's South—Mount Pearl, NL
Russ Hiebert	—N/a	Yes	No	No	South Surrey—White Rock—Cloverdale, BC
Jay Hill	Yes	Yes	No	No	Prince George—Peace River, BC
Betty Hinton	Yes	Yes	No	No	Kamloops—Thompson—Cariboo, BC
Rahim Jaffer	Yes	Yes	No	No	Edmonton—Strathcona, AB
Brian Jean	—N/a	Yes	No	No	Fort McMurray—Athabasca, AB
Dale Johnston	Yes	Yes	No	No	Wetaskiwin, AB
Randy Kamp	—N/a	Yes	No	No	Pitt Meadows—Maple Ridge—Mission, BC
Gerald Keddy	Yes	No	Yes	Yes	South Shore—St. Margaret's, NS
Jason Kenney	Yes	Yes	No	No	Calgary Southeast, AB
Ed Komarnicki	—N/a	Yes	No	No	Souris—Moose Mountain, SK
Daryl Kramp	—N/a	Yes	No	No	Prince Edward—Hastings, ON
Guy Lauzon	—N/a	Yes	No	No	Stormont—Dundas—South Glengarry, ON
Tom Lukiwski	—N/a	Yes	No	No	Regina—Lumsden—Lake Centre, SK
Gary Lunn	Yes	Yes	No	No	Saanich—Gulf Islands, BC
James Lunney	Yes	Yes	No	No	Nanaimo—Alberni, BC
Peter MacKay	Yes	Yes	No	No	Central Nova, NS
Dave MacKenzie	—N/a	Yes	No	No	Oxford, ON
Inky Mark	Yes	Yes	No	No	Dauphin—Swan River—Marquette, MB
Ted Menzies	—N/a	Yes	No	No	Macleod, AB
Rob Merrifield	Yes	Yes	No	No	Yellowhead, AB
Larry Miller	—N/a	Yes	No	No	Bruce—Grey—Owen Sound, ON
Bob Mills	Yes	Yes	No	No	Red Deer, AB
James Moore	Yes	No	Yes	Yes	Port Moody—Westwood—Port Coquitlam, BC
Rob Moore	—N/a	Yes	No	No	Fundy Royal, NB
Rob Nicholson	—N/a	Yes	No	No	Niagara Falls, ON
Gordon O'Connor	—N/a	Yes	No	No	Carleton—Mississippi Mills, ON
Deepak Obhrai	Yes	Yes	No	No	Calgary East, AB
Bev Oda	—N/a	Yes	No	No	Durham, ON
Brian Pallister	Yes	Yes	No	No	Portage—Lisgar, MB
Charlie Penson	Yes	Yes	No	Absent	Peace River, AB
Pierre Poilievre	—N/a	Yes	No	No	Nepean—Carleton, ON
Jim Prentice	—N/a	No	Yes	Yes	Calgary Centre-North, AB
Joe Preston	—N/a	Yes	No	No	Elgin—Middlesex—London, ON
James Rajotte	Yes	Yes	No	No	Edmonton—Leduc, AB
Scott Reid	Yes	Yes	No	No	Lanark—Frontenac—Lennox and Addington, ON
John Reynolds	Yes	Yes	No	No	West Vancouver—Sunshine Coast—Sea to Sky Country, BC
Lee Richardson	—N/a	Yes	No	No	Calgary Centre, AB
Gerry Ritz	Yes	Yes	No	No	Battlefords—Lloydminster, SK
Andrew Scheer	—N/a	Yes	No	No	Regina—Qu'Appelle, SK
Gary Schellenberger	Yes	Yes	No	No	Perth Wellington, ON
Werner Schmidt	Yes	Yes	No	No	Kelowna—Lake Country, BC
Carol Skelton	Yes	Yes	No	No	Saskatoon—Rosetown—Biggar, SK
Joy Smith	—N/a	Yes	No	No	Kildonan—St. Paul, MB
Monte Solberg	Yes	Yes	No	No	Medicine Hat, AB
Kevin Sorenson	Yes	Yes	No	No	Crowfoot, AB
Darrel Stinson	Yes	Yes	No	No	Okanagan—Shuswap, BC
Chuck Strahl	Yes	Yes	No	No	Chilliwack—Fraser Canyon, BC
Greg Thompson	Yes	Yes	No	No	New Brunswick Southwest, NB
Myron Thompson	Yes	Yes	No	No	Wild Rose, AB
David Tilson	—N/a	Yes	No	No	Dufferin—Caledon, ON
Vic Toews	Yes	Yes	No	No	Provencher, MB
Bradley Trost	—N/a	Yes	No	No	Saskatoon—Humboldt, SK
Merv Tweed	—N/a	Yes	No	No	Brandon—Souris, MB
Peter Van Loan	—N/a	Yes	No	No	York—Simcoe, ON
Maurice Vellacott	Yes	Yes	No	No	Saskatoon—Wanuskewin, SK
Mark Warawa	—N/a	Yes	No	No	Langley, BC
Jeff Watson	—N/a	Yes	No	No	Essex, ON
Randy White	Yes	Yes	Absent	No	Abbotsford, BC
John G. Williams	Yes	Yes	No	No	Edmonton—St. Albert, AB
Lynne Yelich	Yes	Yes	No	No	Blackstrap, SK

=== Bloc Québécois ===
The BQ had a free vote.

Name	2003 Alliance motion	Harper amend.	2nd reading	3rd reading	Riding
Guy André	—N/a	No	Yes	Yes	Berthier—Maskinongé, QC
Gérard Asselin	Yes	Yes	No	Absent	Manicouagan, QC
Claude Bachand	No	No	Yes	Yes	Saint-Jean QC
André Bellavance	—N/a	No	Yes	Yes	Richmond—Arthabaska, QC
Stéphane Bergeron	Absent	No	Yes	Paired	Verchères—Les-Patriotes, QC
Bernard Bigras	No	No	Yes	Yes	Rosemont—La Petite-Patrie, QC
Raynald Blais	—N/a	No	Yes	Yes	Gaspésie—Îles-de-la-Madeleine, QC
Alain Boire	—N/a	No	Yes	Yes	Beauharnois—Salaberry, QC
France Bonsant	—N/a	No	Yes	Yes	Compton—Stanstead, QC
Robert Bouchard	—N/a	Absent	No	No	Chicoutimi—Le Fjord, QC
Marc Boulianne	—N/a	No	Yes	Yes	Mégantic—L'Érable, QC
Diane Bourgeois	No	No	Yes	Yes	Terrebonne—Blainville, QC
Paule Brunelle	—N/a	No	Yes	Yes	Trois-Rivières, QC
Serge Cardin	Absent	Yes	No	No	Sherbrooke, QC
Robert Carrier	—N/a	No	Yes	Yes	Alfred-Pellan, QC
Roger Clavet	—N/a	No	Yes	Yes	Louis-Hébert, QC
Bernard Cleary	—N/a	No	Yes	Yes	Louis-Saint-Laurent, QC
Guy Côté	—N/a	No	Yes	Yes	Portneuf—Jacques-Cartier, QC
Paul Crête	No	No	Yes	Yes	Montmagny—L'Islet— Kamouraska—Rivière-du-Loup, QC
Nicole Demers	—N/a	No	Yes	Yes	Laval, QC
Johanne Deschamps	—N/a	No	Yes	Yes	Laurentides—Labelle, QC
Odina Desrochers	Absent	Absent	No	Absent	Lotbinière—Chutes-de-la-Chaudière, QC
Gilles Duceppe	No	No	Yes	Yes	Laurier—Sainte-Marie, QC
Meili Faille	—N/a	No	Yes	Yes	Vaudreuil—Soulanges, QC
Christiane Gagnon	No	No	Yes	Yes	Québec, QC
Marcel Gagnon	No	No	Yes	Yes	Saint-Maurice—Champlain, QC
Sébastien Gagnon	No	No	Yes	Yes	Jonquière—Alma, QC
Roger Gaudet	Yes	Yes	No	No	Montcalm, QC
Michel Gauthier	No	No	Yes	Yes	Roberval—Lac-Saint-Jean, QC
Monique Guay	No	No	Yes	Yes	Rivière-du-Nord, QC
Michel Guimond	No	No	Yes	Yes	Montmorency—Charlevoix—Haute-Côte-Nord, QC
Maka Kotto	—N/a	No	Yes	Absent	Saint-Lambert, QC
Mario Laframboise	Absent	No	Yes	Yes	Argenteuil—Papineau—Mirabel, QC
Francine Lalonde	No	Paired	Yes	Yes	Mercier, QC
Réal Lapierre	—N/a	No	Yes	Yes	Lévis—Bellechasse, QC
Carole Lavallée	—N/a	No	Yes	Yes	Saint-Bruno—Saint-Hubert, QC
Marc Lemay	—N/a	No	Yes	Yes	Abitibi—Témiscamingue, QC
Yves Lessard	—N/a	No	Yes	Yes	Chambly—Borduas, QC
Yvon Lévesque	—N/a	No	Yes	Yes	Abitibi—Baie-James—Nunavik—Eeyou, QC
Yvan Loubier	No	No	Yes	Yes	Saint-Hyacinthe—Bagot, QC
Richard Marceau	No	No	Yes	Yes	Charlesbourg—Haute-Saint-Charles, QC
Réal Ménard	No	No	Yes	Yes	Hochelaga, QC
Serge Ménard	—N/a	No	Yes	Yes	Marc-Aurèle-Fortin, QC
Pierre Paquette	No	No	Yes	Paired	Joliette, QC
Gilles-A. Perron	Absent	Absent	No	No	Rivière-des-Mille-Îles, QC
Pauline Picard	No	No	Yes	Yes	Drummond, QC
Louis Plamondon	No	No	Yes	Yes	Bas-Richelieu—Nicolet—Bécancour, QC
Denise Poirier-Rivard	—N/a	No	Yes	Yes	Châteauguay—Saint-Constant, QC
Jean-Yves Roy	No	No	Yes	Yes	Haute-Gaspésie—La Mitis—Matane—Matapédia, QC
Benoît Sauvageau	No	No	Yes	Yes	Repentigny, QC
Christian Simard	—N/a	No	Yes	Yes	Beauport—Limoilou, QC
Caroline St-Hilaire	No	No	Yes	Absent	Longueuil—Pierre-Boucher, QC
Louise Thibault	—N/a	No	No	No	Rimouski-Neigette—Témiscouata—Les Basques, QC
Robert Vincent	—N/a	No	Yes	Yes	Shefford, QC

=== New Democratic Party ===
The NDP caucus did not allow a free vote so MPs were obliged to vote in favour by the party whip.

Name	2003 Alliance motion	Harper amend.	2nd reading	3rd reading	Riding
Charlie Angus	—N/a	No	Yes	Yes	Timmins-James Bay, ON
Bill Blaikie	No	No	Yes	Yes	Elmwood—Transcona, MB
Ed Broadbent	—N/a	No	Yes	Yes	Ottawa Centre, ON
David Christopherson	—N/a	No	Yes	Yes	Hamilton Centre, ON
Joe Comartin	No	No	Yes	Yes	Windsor—Tecumseh, ON
Jean Crowder	—N/a	No	Yes	Yes	Nanaimo—Cowichan, BC
Nathan Cullen	—N/a	No	Yes	Yes	Skeena—Bulkley Valley, BC
Libby Davies	No	No	Yes	Yes	Vancouver East, BC
Bev Desjarlais	Absent	Absent	Absent	No	Churchill, MB
Yvon Godin	No	No	Yes	Yes	Acadie—Bathurst, NB
Peter Julian	—N/a	No	Yes	Yes	Burnaby—New Westminster, BC
Jack Layton	—N/a	No	Yes	Yes	Toronto—Danforth, ON
Pat Martin	No	No	Yes	Yes	Winnipeg Centre, MB
Tony Martin	—N/a	No	Yes	Yes	Sault Ste. Marie, ON
Brian Masse	No	No	Yes	Yes	Windsor West, ON
Alexa McDonough	No	No	Yes	Yes	Halifax, NS
Bill Siksay	—N/a	No	Yes	Yes	Burnaby—Douglas, BC
Peter Stoffer	Absent	No	Yes	Yes	Sackville——Eastern Shore, NS
Judy Wasylycia-Leis	No	No	Yes	Absent	Winnipeg North, MB

=== Independents ===
Name	2003 Alliance motion	Harper amend.	2nd reading	3rd reading	Riding
Chuck Cadman	Yes	Absent	Absent	Absent	Surrey North, BC
David Kilgour	Absent	Yes	No	No	Edmonton—Mill Woods—Beaumont, AB
Pat O'Brien	Yes	Yes	No	No	London—Fanshawe, ON
Carolyn Parrish	No	Absent	No	Absent	Mississauga—Erindale, ON

=== Speaker ===
As per convention, Peter Milliken, the Speaker of the House of Commons did not vote because the result was not a tie.

== See also ==
- Same-sex marriage in Canada
- Gay rights in Canada
