= Members of the 39th Canadian Parliament and same-sex marriage =

This article lists the members of the 39th Parliament of Canada and their voting records in regards to the Civil Marriage Act, which amended the Marriage Act of Canada to recognize same-sex marriage. The 39th Parliament was elected at the federal election of January 23, 2006. The Conservative leader, Stephen Harper, who was then leader of the opposition campaigned on holding another free vote on the issue, after one was held in the 38th Parliament to approve the Act.

The Conservatives won enough seats to form a government following the election but Harper, who became Prime Minister, only had enough seats to form a minority government meaning the opposition parties had enough seats to defeat a government motion on same-sex marriage. However, a motion could pass if it could attract enough support from individual opposition MPs in a free vote. The government announced that it would introduce a motion before the end of 2006.

On 7 December 2006, the House of Commons of Canada voted on a motion that read as follows: "That this House call on the government to introduce legislation to restore the traditional definition of marriage without affecting civil unions and while respecting existing same-sex marriages." The motion was defeated by a vote of 123 to 175. Liberal and Conservative parties gave their members permission to vote freely. Thirteen Conservatives voted against the motion, and the same number of Liberals voted in favour. The Bloc Québécois and NDP caucuses were expected to oppose the motion, all NDP MPs did so as did all BQ MPs except for two who were paired and two who were absent.

Following the vote, Harper announced that the issue was now settled and that his government would not revisit the matter even if it won a majority government in the next election, held October 14, 2008.

== Votes ==
House of Commons Vote, December 7, 2006

Group	For	Against	Absent	Total
Conservative Cabinet	19	6	0	25
Conservative Backbench	91	7	1	99
Liberal	13	85	3	101
Bloc Québécois	0	47	4	51
NDP	0	29	0	29
Independents	0	1	1	2
Totals	123	175	9	307
House Speaker			1	1

A majority of votes 154 were needed to ensure the motion passed, although the only formal requirement for passing one is the assent of a majority of members in attendance for the vote.

Note: The Speaker of the House of Commons, Peter Milliken, a Liberal, could only vote in the unlikely event of a tie.

== Background ==
Same-sex marriage became legal in Canada in 2003 when a series of court decisions declared that denying the privilege to homosexuals was unconstitutional. The Civil Marriage Act was approved by the Canadian House of Commons on June 28, 2005, by a margin of 158 to 133 and was subsequently passed by the Senate of Canada on July 19, 2005, before being given Royal Assent on July 20, 2005. This law brought the two provinces where such court challenges had not been resolved, Alberta and Prince Edward Island, in line with the rest of the country. The issue remained controversial and Conservative leader Stephen Harper pledged to revisit the issue with a free vote should the Conservatives form a government. Harper's party won the greatest number of seats in the 2006 federal election. Harper said that he would address this issue by means of a simple motion to the House as to whether or not the matter should be revisited. If the motion were to pass his government would introduce legislation to change the legal definition of marriage to two opposite sex people, while creating civil unions for same-sex couples; should the motion be defeated, the government will take no further action.

== House of Commons ==
=== Conservative Cabinet ===
Name	2003 Alliance motion	Bill C-38 (2005)	Dec 2006 motion to restore	Riding
Rona Ambrose	—N/a	No	Yes	Edmonton—Spruce Grove, AB
John Baird	—N/a	—N/a	No	Ottawa West—Nepean, ON
Maxime Bernier	—N/a	—N/a	Yes	Beauce, QC
Jean-Pierre Blackburn	—N/a	—N/a	Yes	Jonquière—Alma, QC
Lawrence Cannon	—N/a	—N/a	No	Pontiac, QC
Tony Clement	—N/a	—N/a	Yes	Parry Sound-Muskoka, ON
Stockwell Day	Yes	No	Yes	Okanagan—Coquihalla, BC
David Emerson	—N/a	Yes	No	Vancouver Kingsway, BC
Diane Finley	—N/a	No	Yes	Haldimand—Norfolk, ON
Jim Flaherty	—N/a	—N/a	Yes	Whitby-Oshawa, ON
Stephen Harper	Yes	No	Yes	Calgary Southwest, AB
Loyola Hearn	Absent	No	Yes	St. John's South—Mount Pearl, NL
Gary Lunn	Yes	No	Yes	Saanich—Gulf Islands, BC
Peter MacKay	Yes	No	No	Central Nova, NS
Rob Nicholson	—N/a	No	Yes	Niagara Falls, ON
Gordon O'Connor	—N/a	No	Yes	Carleton—Mississippi Mills, ON
Bev Oda	—N/a	No	Yes	Durham, ON
Jim Prentice	—N/a	Yes	No	Calgary Centre-North, AB
Carol Skelton	Yes	No	Yes	Saskatoon—Rosetown—Biggar, SK
Monte Solberg	Yes	No	Yes	Medicine Hat, AB
Chuck Strahl	Yes	No	Yes	Chilliwack—Fraser Canyon, BC
Greg Thompson	Yes	No	Yes	New Brunswick Southwest, NB
Vic Toews	Yes	No	Yes	Provencher, MB
Peter Van Loan	—N/a	No	Yes	York—Simcoe, ON
Josée Verner	—N/a	—N/a	No	Louis-St-Laurent, QC

=== Conservative backbench ===
Name	2003 Alliance motion	Bill C-38 (2005)	Dec 2006 motion to restore	Riding
Jim Abbott	Yes	No	Yes	Kootenay—Columbia, BC
Diane Ablonczy	Yes	No	Yes	Calgary—Nose Hill, AB
Harold Albrecht	—N/a	—N/a	Yes	Kitchener—Conestoga, ON
Michael Allen	—N/a	—N/a	Yes	Tobique—Mactaquac, NB
Dean Allison	—N/a	No	Yes	Niagara West—Glanbrook, ON
Rob Anders	Yes	No	Yes	Calgary West, AB
David L. Anderson	Yes	No	Yes	Cypress Hills—Grasslands, SK
Dave Batters	—N/a	No	Yes	Palliser, SK
Leon Benoit	Yes	No	Yes	Vegreville—Wainwright, AB
James Bezan	—N/a	No	Yes	Selkirk—Interlake, MB
Steven Blaney	—N/a	—N/a	Yes	Lévis—Bellechasse, QC
Sylvie Boucher	—N/a	—N/a	Yes	Beauport—Limoilou, QC
Garry Breitkreuz	Yes	No	Yes	Yorkton—Melville, SK
Gord Brown	—N/a	No	Yes	Leeds—Grenville, ON
Patrick Brown	—N/a	—N/a	Yes	Barrie, ON
Rod Bruinooge	—N/a	—N/a	Yes	Winnipeg South, MB
Blaine Calkins	—N/a	—N/a	Yes	Wetaskiwin, AB
Ron Cannan	—N/a	—N/a	Yes	Kelowna—Lake Country, BC
Colin Carrie	—N/a	No	Yes	Oshawa, ON
Bill Casey	Yes	No	No	Cumberland—Colchester—Musquodoboit Valley, NS
Rick Casson	Yes	No	Yes	Lethbridge, AB
Michael Chong	—N/a	No	No	Wellington—Halton Hills, ON
John Cummins	Yes	No	Yes	Delta—Richmond East, BC
Pat Davidson	—N/a	—N/a	Yes	Sarnia—Lambton, ON
Dean Del Mastro	—N/a	—N/a	Yes	Peterborough, ON
Barry Devolin	—N/a	No	Yes	Haliburton—Kawartha Lakes—Brock, ON
Norman Doyle	Yes	No	Yes	St. John's East, NL
Rick Dykstra	—N/a	—N/a	Yes	St. Catharines, ON
Ken Epp	Yes	No	Yes	Edmonton—Sherwood Park, AB
Edward Fast	—N/a	—N/a	Yes	Abbotsford, BC
Brian Fitzpatrick	Yes	No	Yes	Prince Albert, SK
Steven Fletcher	—N/a	No	Yes	Charleswood—St. James—Assiniboia, MB
Royal Galipeau	—N/a	—N/a	Absent	Ottawa—Orléans, ON
Cheryl Gallant	Yes	No	Yes	Renfrew—Nipissing—Pembroke, ON
Peter Goldring	Yes	No	Yes	Edmonton East, AB
Gary Goodyear	—N/a	No	Yes	Cambridge, ON
Jacques Gourde	—N/a	—N/a	Yes	Lotbinière—Chutes-de-la-Chaudière, QC
Nina Grewal	—N/a	No	Yes	Fleetwood—Port Kells, BC
Helena Guergis	—N/a	No	Yes	Simcoe—Grey, ON
Art Hanger	Yes	No	Yes	Calgary Northeast, AB
Richard Harris	Yes	No	Yes	Cariboo—Prince George, BC
Luc Harvey	—N/a	—N/a	Yes	Louis-Hébert, QC
Laurie Hawn	—N/a	—N/a	Yes	Edmonton Centre, AB
Russ Hiebert	—N/a	No	Yes	South Surrey—White Rock—Cloverdale, BC
Jay Hill	Yes	No	Yes	Prince George—Peace River, BC
Betty Hinton	Yes	No	Yes	Kamloops—Thompson—Cariboo, BC
Rahim Jaffer	Yes	No	Yes	Edmonton—Strathcona, AB
Brian Jean	—N/a	No	Yes	Fort McMurray—Athabasca, AB
Randy Kamp	—N/a	No	Yes	Pitt Meadows—Maple Ridge—Mission, BC
Gerald Keddy	Yes	Yes	No	South Shore—St. Margaret's, NS
Jason Kenney	Yes	No	Yes	Calgary Southeast, AB
Ed Komarnicki	—N/a	No	Yes	Souris—Moose Mountain, SK
Daryl Kramp	—N/a	No	Yes	Prince Edward—Hastings, ON
Michael Lake	—N/a	—N/a	Yes	Edmonton—Mill Woods—Beaumont, AB
Guy Lauzon	—N/a	No	Yes	Stormont—Dundas—South Glengarry, ON
Pierre Lemieux	—N/a	—N/a	Yes	Glengarry—Prescott—Russell, ON
Tom Lukiwski	—N/a	No	Yes	Regina—Lumsden—Lake Centre, SK
James Lunney	Yes	No	Yes	Nanaimo—Alberni, BC
Dave MacKenzie	—N/a	No	Yes	Oxford, ON
Fabian Manning	—N/a	—N/a	No	Avalon, NL
Inky Mark	Yes	No	Yes	Dauphin—Swan River—Marquette, MB
Colin Mayes	—N/a	—N/a	Yes	Okanagan—Shuswap, BC
Ted Menzies	—N/a	No	Yes	Macleod, AB
Rob Merrifield	Yes	No	Yes	Yellowhead, AB
Larry Miller	—N/a	No	Yes	Bruce—Grey—Owen Sound, ON
Bob Mills	Yes	No	Yes	Red Deer, AB
James Moore	Yes	Yes	No	Port Moody—Westwood—Port Coquitlam, BC
Rob Moore	—N/a	No	Yes	Fundy Royal, NB
Rick Norlock	—N/a	—N/a	Yes	Northumberland—Quinte West, ON
Deepak Obhrai	Yes	No	Yes	Calgary East, AB
Brian Pallister	Yes	No	Yes	Portage—Lisgar, MB
Christian Paradis	—N/a	—N/a	No	Mégantic—L'Érable, QC
Daniel Petit	—N/a	—N/a	Yes	Charlesbourg—Haute-Saint-Charles, QC
Pierre Poilievre	—N/a	No	Yes	Nepean—Carleton, ON
Joe Preston	—N/a	No	Yes	Elgin—Middlesex—London, ON
James Rajotte	Yes	No	Yes	Edmonton—Leduc, AB
Scott Reid	Yes	No	Yes	Lanark—Frontenac—Lennox and Addington, ON
Lee Richardson	—N/a	No	No	Calgary Centre, AB
Gerry Ritz	Yes	No	Yes	Battlefords—Lloydminster, SK
Andrew Scheer	—N/a	No	Yes	Regina—Qu'Appelle, SK
Gary Schellenberger	Yes	No	Yes	Perth Wellington, ON
Bev Shipley	—N/a	—N/a	Yes	Lambton—Kent—Middlesex, ON
Joy Smith	—N/a	No	Yes	Kildonan—St. Paul, MB
Kevin Sorenson	Yes	No	Yes	Crowfoot, AB
Bruce Stanton	—N/a	—N/a	Yes	Simcoe North, ON
Brian Storseth	—N/a	—N/a	Yes	Westlock—St. Paul, AB
David Sweet	—N/a	—N/a	Yes	Ancaster—Dundas—Flamborough—Westdale, ON
Myron Thompson	Yes	No	Yes	Wild Rose, AB
David Tilson	—N/a	No	Yes	Dufferin—Caledon, ON
Bradley Trost	—N/a	No	Yes	Saskatoon—Humboldt, SK
Merv Tweed	—N/a	No	Yes	Brandon—Souris, MB
Dave Van Kesteren	—N/a	—N/a	Yes	Chatham-Kent—Essex, ON
Maurice Vellacott	Yes	No	Yes	Saskatoon—Wanuskewin, SK
Mike Wallace	—N/a	—N/a	Yes	Burlington, ON
Mark Warawa	—N/a	No	Yes	Langley, BC
Chris Warkentin	—N/a	—N/a	Yes	Peace River, AB
Jeff Watson	—N/a	No	Yes	Essex, ON
John G. Williams	Yes	No	Yes	Edmonton—St. Albert, AB
Lynne Yelich	Yes	No	Yes	Blackstrap, SK

=== Liberal Party ===
Name	2003 Alliance motion	Bill C-38 (2005)	Dec 2006 motion to restore	Riding
Omar Alghabra	—N/a	—N/a	No	Mississauga—Erindale, ON
Larry Bagnell	No	Yes	No	Yukon, YT
Navdeep Bains	—N/a	Yes	No	Mississauga—Brampton South, ON
Sue Barnes	No	Yes	Absent	London West, ON
Colleen Beaumier	No	Yes	No	Brampton West, ON
Mauril Bélanger	No	Yes	No	Ottawa—Vanier, ON
Don Bell	—N/a	Yes	No	North Vancouver, BC
Carolyn Bennett	No	Yes	No	St. Paul's, ON
Maurizio Bevilacqua	No	Yes	No	Vaughan, ON
Ray Bonin	Yes	No	Yes	Nickel Belt, ON
Ken Boshcoff	—N/a	No	No	Thunder Bay—Rainy River, ON
Scott Brison	No	Yes	No	Kings—Hants, NS
Bonnie Brown	No	Yes	No	Oakville, ON
Gerry Byrne	No	Absent	Yes	Humber—St. Barbe—Baie Verte, NL
John Cannis	Yes	No	Absent	Scarborough Centre, ON
Brenda Chamberlain	Yes	No	No	Guelph, ON
Raymond Chan	—N/a	Yes	No	Richmond, BC
Denis Coderre	No	Yes	No	Bourassa, QC
Joe Comuzzi	Absent	No	No	Thunder Bay—Superior North, ON
Irwin Cotler	Absent	Yes	No	Mount Royal, QC
Roy Cullen	No	Paired	Yes	Etobicoke North, ON
Rodger Cuzner	No	No	No	Cape Breton—Canso, NS
Jean-Claude D'Amours	—N/a	Yes	No	Madawaska—Restigouche, NB
Ruby Dhalla	—N/a	Yes	No	Brampton—Springdale, ON
Sukh Dhaliwal	—N/a	—N/a	No	Newton—North Delta, BC
Stéphane Dion	No	Yes	No	Saint-Laurent—Cartierville, QC
Ujjal Dosanjh	—N/a	Yes	No	Vancouver South, BC
Ken Dryden	—N/a	Yes	No	York Centre, ON
Wayne Easter	No	Yes	No	Malpeque, PE
Mark Eyking	Yes	Yes	No	Sydney—Victoria, NS
Raymonde Folco	No	Yes	Absent	Laval—Les Îles, QC
Hedy Fry	No	Yes	No	Vancouver Centre, BC
John Godfrey	No	Yes	No	Don Valley West, ON
Ralph Goodale	No	Yes	No	Wascana, SK
Bill Graham	No	Yes	No	Toronto Centre, ON
Albina Guarnieri	Yes	Yes	No	Mississauga East—Cooksville, ON
Mark Holland	—N/a	Yes	No	Ajax—Pickering, ON
Charles Hubbard	Yes	No	No	Miramichi, NB
Michael Ignatieff	—N/a	—N/a	No	Etobicoke—Lakeshore, ON
Marlene Jennings	No	Yes	No	Notre-Dame-de-Grâce—Lachine, QC
Susan Kadis	—N/a	Yes	No	Thornhill, ON
Nancy Karetak-Lindell	No	Yes	No	Nunavut, NU
Jim Karygiannis	Yes	No	Yes	Scarborough—Agincourt, ON
Tina Keeper	—N/a	—N/a	No	Churchill, MB
Wajid Khan	—N/a	No	Yes	Mississauga—Streetsville, ON
Jean Lapierre	—N/a	Yes	No	Outremont, QC
Dominic LeBlanc	No	Yes	No	Beauséjour, NB
Derek Lee	Yes	No	Yes	Scarborough—Rouge River, ON
Lawrence MacAulay	Absent	No	No	Cardigan, PE
Gurbax Malhi	Yes	No	Yes	Bramalea—Gore—Malton, ON
John Maloney	Yes	No	No	Welland, ON
Diane Marleau	No	Yes	No	Sudbury, ON
Keith Martin	Yes	Yes	No	Esquimalt—Juan de Fuca, BC
Paul Martin	No	Yes	No	LaSalle—Émard, QC
Bill Matthews	Absent	No	No	Random—Burin—St. George's, NL
John McCallum	No	Yes	No	Markham—Unionville, ON
David McGuinty	—N/a	Yes	No	Ottawa South, ON
Joe McGuire	Yes	Yes	No	Egmont, PE
John McKay	Yes	No	Yes	Scarborough-Guildwood, ON
Dan McTeague	Yes	No	Yes	Pickering—Scarborough East, ON
Gary Merasty	—N/a	—N/a	No	Desnethé—Missinippi—Churchill River, SK
Maria Minna	No	Yes	No	Beaches—East York, ON
Brian Murphy	—N/a	—N/a	No	Moncton—Riverview—Dieppe, NB
Shawn Murphy	Yes	Yes	No	Charlottetown, PE
Anita Neville	No	Yes	No	Winnipeg South Centre, MB
Stephen Owen	Absent	Yes	No	Vancouver Quadra, BC
Massimo Pacetti	Absent	No	No	Saint-Léonard—Saint-Michel, QC
Bernard Patry	No	Paired	No	Pierrefonds—Dollard, QC
Glen Pearson	—N/a	—N/a	No	London North Centre, ON
Jim Peterson	No	Yes	No	Willowdale, ON
Marcel Proulx	No	Yes	No	Hull—Aylmer, QC
Yasmin Ratansi	—N/a	Yes	No	Don Valley East, ON
Karen Redman	No	Yes	No	Kitchener Centre, ON
Geoff Regan	No	Yes	No	Halifax West, NS
Lucienne Robillard	No	Yes	No	Westmount—Ville-Marie, QC
Pablo Rodriguez	—N/a	Yes	No	Honoré—Mercier, QC
Anthony Rota	—N/a	Yes	No	Nipissing—Timiskaming, ON
Todd Russell	—N/a	Yes	No	Labrador, NL
Michael Savage	—N/a	Yes	No	Dartmouth—Cole Harbour, NS
Francis Scarpaleggia	—N/a	No	Yes	Lac-Saint-Louis, QC
Andy Scott	No	Yes	No	Fredericton, NB
Judy Sgro	Yes	Yes	No	York West, ON
Mario Silva	—N/a	Yes	No	Davenport, ON
Raymond Simard	No	No	No	Saint Boniface, MB
Scott Simms	—N/a	No	No	Bonavista—Gander—Grand Falls—Windsor, NL
Lloyd St. Amand	—N/a	Yes	No	Brant, ON
Brent St. Denis	No	Yes	No	Algoma—Manitoulin—Kapuskasing, ON
Paul Steckle	Yes	No	Yes	Huron—Bruce, ON
Belinda Stronach	—N/a	Yes	No	Newmarket—Aurora, ON
Paul Szabo	Yes	No	No	Mississauga South, ON
Andrew Telegdi	No	Yes	No	Kitchener—Waterloo, ON
Lui Temelkovski	—N/a	Yes	No	Oak Ridges—Markham, ON
Robert G. Thibault	No	Yes	No	West Nova, NS
Alan Tonks	Yes	No	Yes	York South—Weston, ON
Roger Valley	—N/a	Yes	No	Kenora, ON
Joe Volpe	Yes	Yes	No	Eglinton—Lawrence, ON
Tom Wappel	Yes	No	Yes	Scarborough Southwest, ON
Blair Wilson	—N/a	—N/a	No	West Vancouver—Sunshine Coast—Sea to Sky Country, BC
Bryon Wilfert	Yes	No	No	Richmond Hill, ON
Borys Wrzesnewskyj	—N/a	Yes	No	Etobicoke Centre, ON
Paul Zed	—N/a	No	No	Saint John, NB

=== Bloc Québécois ===
Leader Gilles Duceppe announced on February 10, 2006, that he would force the caucus to vote against Harper's motion.

Name	2003 Alliance motion	Bill C-38 (2005)	Dec 2006 motion to restore	Riding
Guy André	—N/a	Yes	No	Berthier—Maskinongé, QC
Gérard Asselin	Yes	Absent	No	Manicouagan, QC
Claude Bachand	No	Yes	No	Saint-Jean QC
Vivian Barbot	—N/a	—N/a	No	Papineau, QC
André Bellavance	—N/a	Yes	No	Richmond—Arthabaska, QC
Bernard Bigras	No	Yes	No	Rosemont—La Petite-Patrie, QC
Raynald Blais	—N/a	Yes	No	Gaspésie—Îles-de-la-Madeleine, QC
France Bonsant	—N/a	Yes	No	Compton—Stanstead, QC
Robert Bouchard	—N/a	No	No	Chicoutimi—Le Fjord, QC
Diane Bourgeois	No	Yes	No	Terrebonne—Blainville, QC
Paule Brunelle	—N/a	Yes	No	Trois-Rivières, QC
Serge Cardin	Absent	No	Absent	Sherbrooke, QC
Robert Carrier	—N/a	Yes	No	Alfred-Pellan, QC
Paul Crête	No	Yes	No	Montmagny—L'Islet— Kamouraska—Rivière-du-Loup, QC
Claude Debellefeuille	—N/a	—N/a	No	Beauharnois—Salaberry, QC
Nicole Demers	—N/a	Yes	No	Laval, QC
Johanne Deschamps	—N/a	Yes	No	Laurentides—Labelle, QC
Gilles Duceppe	No	Yes	No	Laurier—Sainte-Marie, QC
Meili Faille	—N/a	Yes	No	Vaudreuil—Soulanges, QC
Carole Freeman	—N/a	—N/a	No	Châteauguay, QC
Christiane Gagnon	No	Yes	No	Québec, QC
Roger Gaudet	Yes	No	No	Montcalm, QC
Michel Gauthier	No	Yes	No	Roberval—Lac-Saint-Jean, QC
Raymond Gravel	—N/a	—N/a	Absent	Repentigny, QC
Monique Guay	No	Yes	No	Rivière-du-Nord, QC
Michel Guimond	No	Yes	No	Montmorency—Charlevoix—Haute-Côte-Nord, QC
Maka Kotto	—N/a	Absent	No	Saint-Lambert, QC
Jean-Yves Laforest	—N/a	—N/a	No	Saint-Maurice—Champlain, QC
Mario Laframboise	Absent	Yes	No	Argenteuil—Papineau—Mirabel, QC
Francine Lalonde	No	Yes	No	Mercier, QC
Carole Lavallée	—N/a	Yes	No	Saint-Bruno—Saint-Hubert, QC
Marc Lemay	—N/a	Yes	No	Abitibi—Témiscamingue, QC
Yves Lessard	—N/a	Yes	No	Chambly—Borduas, QC
Yvon Lévesque	—N/a	Yes	No	Abitibi—Baie-James—Nunavik—Eeyou, QC
Yvan Loubier	No	Yes	Absent (Paired)	Saint-Hyacinthe—Bagot, QC
Marcel Lussier	—N/a	—N/a	No	Brossard—La Prairie, QC
Luc Malo	—N/a	—N/a	No	Verchères—Les Patriotes, QC
Réal Ménard	No	Yes	No	Hochelaga, QC
Serge Ménard	—N/a	Yes	No	Marc-Aurèle-Fortin, QC
Maria Mourani	—N/a	—N/a	No	Ahuntsic, QC
Richard Nadeau	—N/a	—N/a	No	Gatineau, QC
Christian Ouellet	—N/a	—N/a	No	Brome—Missisquoi, QC
Pierre Paquette	No	Paired	No	Joliette, QC
Gilles-A. Perron	Absent	No	No	Rivière-des-Mille-Îles, QC
Pauline Picard	No	Yes	No	Drummond, QC
Louis Plamondon	No	Yes	No	Bas-Richelieu—Nicolet—Bécancour, QC
Jean-Yves Roy	No	Yes	No	Haute-Gaspésie—La Mitis—Matane—Matapédia, QC
Thierry St-Cyr	—N/a	—N/a	No	Jeanne-Le Ber, QC
Caroline St-Hilaire	No	Absent	No	Longueuil—Pierre-Boucher, QC
Louise Thibault	—N/a	No	Absent (Paired)	Rimouski-Neigette—Témiscouata—Les Basques, QC
Robert Vincent	—N/a	Yes	No	Shefford, QC

=== New Democratic Party ===
The NDP caucus did not allow a free vote so MPs were obliged to vote against the Conservative motion.

Name	2003 Alliance motion	Bill C-38 (2005)	Dec 2006 motion to restore	Riding
Charlie Angus	—N/a	Yes	No	Timmins-James Bay, ON
Alex Atamanenko	—N/a	—N/a	No	British Columbia Southern Interior, BC
Catherine J. Bell	—N/a	—N/a	No	Vancouver Island North, BC
Dennis Bevington	—N/a	—N/a	No	Western Arctic
Dawn Black	—N/a	—N/a	No	New Westminster—Coquitlam, BC
Bill Blaikie	No	Yes	No	Elmwood—Transcona, MB
Chris Charlton	—N/a	—N/a	No	Hamilton Mountain, ON
Olivia Chow	—N/a	—N/a	No	Trinity—Spadina, ON
David Christopherson	—N/a	Yes	No	Hamilton Centre, ON
Joe Comartin	No	Yes	No	Windsor—Tecumseh, ON
Jean Crowder	—N/a	Yes	No	Nanaimo—Cowichan, BC
Nathan Cullen	—N/a	Yes	No	Skeena—Bulkley Valley, BC
Libby Davies	No	Yes	No	Vancouver East, BC
Paul Dewar	—N/a	—N/a	No	Ottawa Centre, ON
Yvon Godin	No	Yes	No	Acadie—Bathurst, NB
Peter Julian	—N/a	Yes	No	Burnaby—New Westminster, BC
Jack Layton	—N/a	Yes	No	Toronto—Danforth, ON
Wayne Marston	—N/a	—N/a	No	Hamilton East—Stoney Creek, ON
Pat Martin	No	Yes	No	Winnipeg Centre, MB
Tony Martin	—N/a	Yes	No	Sault Ste. Marie, ON
Brian Masse	No	Yes	No	Windsor West, ON
Irene Mathyssen	—N/a	—N/a	No	London—Fanshawe, ON
Alexa McDonough	No	Yes	No	Halifax, NS
Peggy Nash	—N/a	—N/a	No	Parkdale-High Park, ON
Penny Priddy	—N/a	—N/a	No	Surrey North, BC
Denise Savoie	—N/a	—N/a	No	Victoria, BC
Bill Siksay	—N/a	Yes	No	Burnaby—Douglas, BC
Peter Stoffer	Absent	Yes	No	Sackville——Eastern Shore, NS
Judy Wasylycia-Leis	No	Absent	No	Winnipeg North, MB

=== Independents ===
Name	2003 Alliance motion	Bill C-38 (2005)	Dec 2006 motion to restore	Riding
André Arthur	—N/a	—N/a	Absent	Portneuf—Jacques-Cartier, Quebec
Garth Turner	—N/a	—N/a	No	Halton, ON

=== Speaker ===
The Speaker of the House of Commons did not vote.
