= Same-sex marriage in New Brunswick =

Same-sex marriage has been legal in New Brunswick since June 23, 2005, following a ruling from the Court of Queen's Bench of New Brunswick. This decision followed similar cases in eight other provinces and territories, and pre-dated by only one month the federal Civil Marriage Act of 2005, which legalised same-sex marriage throughout Canada. New Brunswick was the ninth jurisdiction in Canada and the twelfth in the world to recognise same-sex marriage.

== Background ==
Following a number of court rulings in other provinces and territories recognizing the right of same-sex couples to marry, Attorney General Brad Green announced in September 2004 that New Brunswick would not follow Nova Scotia's lead in issuing marriage licences to same-sex couples. He argued that the definition was a federal matter and that the province would recognize only marriages between "a man and a woman" until the Government of Canada came up with a new definition, which it eventually did with the Civil Marriage Act in 2005. In December 2004, Premier Bernard Lord indicated that his government would comply with the federal legislation if enacted by the Parliament of Canada. He also indicated he would comply with a court ruling, even though he was personally opposed to same-sex marriage, and promised to push for the passage of a provincial law protecting religious groups from being sued if they refused to marry same-sex couples. Leader of the New Brunswick New Democratic Party Elizabeth Weir welcomed the Supreme Court's findings in Reference Re Same-Sex Marriage.

== Court ruling ==
In April 2005, four same-sex couples filed a court challenge, Harrison v. Canada (Attorney General), against the government's policy of denying marriage licences to same-sex couples. The couples included prominent New Brunswick gay rights advocate Art Vautour-Toole and his husband Wayne Toole (who had married in Ontario), as well as Catherine Sidney and Bridget McGale, who were denied a licence in Saint John, Wayne Harrison and Ross Leavitt, and James Crooks and Carl Trickey. Their lawyer, Allison Menard, agreed to represent the couples in court free of charge. The case named both the provincial and federal attorneys general as defendants, Brad Green and Irwin Cotler. Menard told The Globe and Mail: "Because Parliament is not doing its job, these couples are being forced to make their challenge in court." A spokesman for Canadians for Equal Marriage confirmed that the couples were "frustrated" with the parliamentary delay in passing the Civil Marriage Act, "It is clear that this court action is a last resort taken by gay and lesbian couples in New Brunswick who want to join the other nearly 90 percent of Canadians who live in jurisdictions where same-sex couples have the right to marry, They don't have that right in New Brunswick, even though they are Canadian citizens, taxpayers and contributing members of their community."

On June 23 of that year, Judge Judith Clendening of the Court of Queen's Bench of New Brunswick in Moncton ruled that the province's failure to issue marriage licences to same-sex couples was a violation of their Charter rights, in accordance with court rulings in other provinces and territories. She allowed a ten-day grace period to the government to make the necessary administrative adjustments, after which it had to begin issuing marriage licences. This was less than a month before the Parliament of Canada made same-sex marriage legal throughout the country. The new licences became available on July 4. This decision meant that about 90% of the Canadian population were living in provinces and territories where same-sex marriage is legal. The federal Civil Marriage Act, which received royal assent on July 20, 2005, expanded this number to cover the entire country.

== Provincial legislation ==
In March 2007, the Legislative Assembly of New Brunswick amended provincial law to allow same-sex couples to adopt. The amendments took effect on 1 February 2008. In December 2008, the Assembly made numerous amendments to the Marriage Act (French: Loi sur le mariage; Mi'kmaq: Malie'wuti Tplutaqan; Maliseet-Passamaquoddy: Nipuwuwakon Tpaskuwakon) and other acts regarding family law, replacing references to "husband and wife" with the gender-neutral term "spouses". The legislation received royal assent by Lieutenant Governor Herménégilde Chiasson on 19 December 2008.

New Brunswick legislation recognises cohabitation agreements (French: convention de vie commune) which can be entered into by unmarried couples living together. These written agreements, recognized by the provincial Family Services Act, outline the rights and responsibilities of common-law partners. The agreement provides partners with several, but not all, of the rights and benefits of marriage. Common-law partners are allowed to make medical decisions for each other in the case one partner is unable to (e.g. accident), enjoy the same tax benefits as married spouses, are required to support one another, and may be entitled to share pension credits if the partners have lived together continuously for two years. However, common-law partners lack some of the rights and benefits afforded to married couples, particularly regarding property and inheritance rights in the event of a breakdown of the relationship or the death of a partner. Goods that were purposely intended and acquired for common use by the couple will generally be divided upon separation, but goods acquired by one partner only will generally not be divided and only the partner that purchased the goods will be entitled to them. This is not the case for married couples as the Marital Property Act provides an equal division of property to married spouses. A common-law partner is also not recognised as an heir upon the death of the partner and may not inherit the partner's property, unless explicitly mentioned in a will. However, the Provision for Dependants Act allows a surviving common-law partner to ask a court to order the deceased partner's estate to provide support based on a "dependant" status, if the deceased partner did not provide for the surviving partner through a will.

== Marriage statistics ==
The 2016 Canadian census showed that there were 1,435 same-sex couples living in New Brunswick.

== Religious performance ==
In July 2019, Bishop David Edwards of the Diocese of Fredericton voted against a motion to authorise same-sex marriage in the Anglican Church of Canada. The motion to permit same-sex marriage was narrowed rejected, and instead the church synod passed a resolution known as "A Word to the Church", allowing its dioceses to choose whether to bless and perform same-sex marriages. Edwards supported the resolution, later saying that "during the Fall, discussions will take place in dioceses across the country, including ours, as to how to respond to the outcome of General Synod".

The Unitarian Fellowship of Fredericton, a congregation of the Canadian Unitarian Council, has been performing same-sex marriage ceremonies since the 1960s. Some other religious organisations also perform same-sex marriages in their places of worship, including the United Church of Canada, Quakers, and the Evangelical Lutheran Church in Canada. In 1996, Jim Crooks and Carl Trickey were married at the Centenary Queen Square United Church in Saint John, marking the first same-sex wedding in a United church in the Maritime provinces. The church was later vandalized by opponents of same-sex marriage.

== Public opinion ==
A 2017 CROP poll showed that 78% of respondents in Atlantic Canada supported same-sex marriage, but did not give a figure for each Atlantic province individually. Nationwide, 74% of Canadians were of the same view, while 26% disagreed.

== See also ==
- Same-sex marriage in Canada
- LGBT rights in Canada
