= Philip Lawrence (politician) =

Canadian politician

Philip Lawrence MP
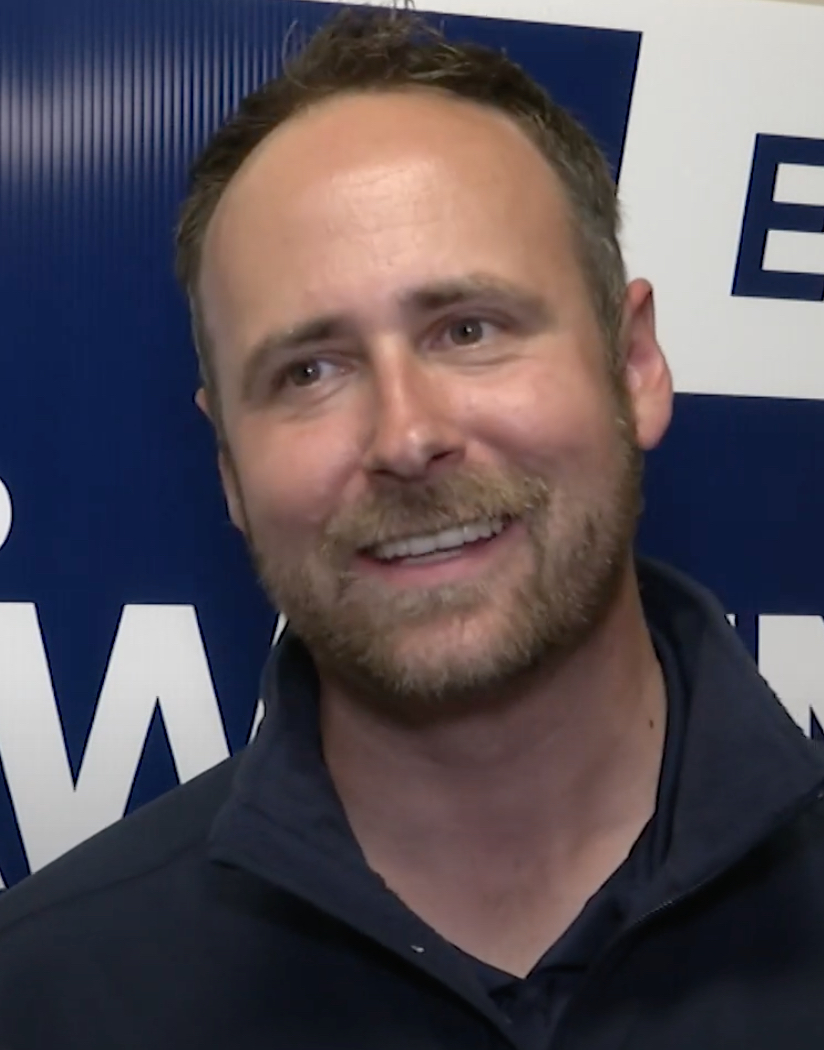

Member of Parliament for Northumberland—Clarke Northumberland—Peterborough South (2019–2025)
- Incumbent
- Assumed office October 21, 2019
- Preceded by: Kim Rudd

Personal details
- Party: Conservative Party of Canada
- Spouse: Natasha Lawrence
- Education: Brock University (BA); Osgoode Hall Law School (JD); Schulich School of Business (MBA)
- Profession: Financial Planner, Lawyer

Philip Lawrence MP is a Canadian politician who was elected to represent the riding of Northumberland—Peterborough South in the House of Commons of Canada in the 2019 Canadian federal election. He was appointed Shadow Minister for Intergovernmental Affairs and One Canadian Economy, Inter-Provincial Trade in the Conservative Party's shadow cabinet in 2025.

In the past, he has also served in the shadow cabinet as Shadow Minister of National Revenue, Associate Shadow Minister for Finance and Middle Class Prosperity (Tax Reform), and Shadow Minister for Federal Economic Development Agency for Eastern, Central, and Southern Ontario.

== Background ==
Lawrence started his studies in Political Science at Brock University where he earned his BA. He went on to attend Osgoode Hall Law School and the Schulich School of Business to obtain his law degree and MBA. He started his practice in law with a focus on taxation and corporations. In 2008 he joined one of Canada's largest financial institutions, becoming the third generation in his family to work in financial services. He was 40 years of age in a statement published Sept. 22, 2018.

Lawrence also chose to contribute to his profession by volunteering at the Financial Planning Standards Council. He participated in developing the examination questions, and eventually moved to the disciplinary committee, where he continues to serve.

== Politics ==
In February 2020, he proposed a private member's bill, Bill C-206, An Act to amend the Greenhouse Gas Pollution Pricing Act (qualifying farming fuel). The bill would have exempted natural gas and propane used by farmers from carbon taxes.

In April 2021, he sponsored an e-petition brought forward by an anti-LGBT pastor aiming to water down Bill-6, which would bring a federal conversion therapy ban into force in Canada.

In mid-May 2021, he sent a letter to the Minister of Public Safety and Emergency Preparedness stating that "the government's failure to secure the border and prevent the further spread of variants has cost Canadians their lives and livelihoods."

== Personal life ==
Lawrence is the son of James and Leslie Lawrence. Leslie was a teacher, while James worked in insurance and financial services, bringing Philip on as an associate during his university studies. The family had lived in Regina, Saskatchewan and the Durham area before settling in Pelham Ontario. In 2004 he married Natasha, who is an Occupational Therapist. The couple moved to a farm in Orono, Ontario in January 2013, where they had their two children. He is a member of the Newcastle Lions Club and a Director in the Northumberland-Peterborough South Conservative Party riding association.

== Electoral record ==
2025 Canadian federal election: Northumberland—Clarke
Party	Candidate	Votes	%	±%	Expenditures
Conservative	Philip Lawrence	34,862	48.97	+4.98	$108,538.24
Liberal	John Goheen	32,648	45.86	+11.84	$122,595.83
New Democratic	Ava Becker	2,090	2.94	–11.01	$606.19
Green	Christina Marie Wilson	630	0.88	–1.68	$2,119.90
People's	Lisa Bradburn	521	0.73	–4.74	$0.00
Independent	Jody Ledgerwood	270	0.38	N/A	$6,885.84
Christian Heritage	John Wesselius	171	0.24	N/A	$2,813.48
Total valid votes/expense limit		71,192	99.54	–	$140,428.69
Total rejected ballots		326	0.46	-0.22	
Turnout		71,518	74.99		
Eligible voters		95,368			
Conservative notional hold		Swing		–3.43	
Source: Elections Canada

2021 Canadian federal election: Northumberland—Peterborough South
Party	Candidate	Votes	%	±%	Expenditures
Conservative	Philip Lawrence	31,015	44.5	+4.8	$102,345.39
Liberal	Alison Lester	23,336	33.5	-2.7	$114,472.38
New Democratic	Kim McArthur-Jackson	9,809	14.1	+0.2	$7,800.16
People's	Nathan Lang	3,813	5.5	+3.4	$7,035.54
Green	Christina Wilson	1,764	2.5	-5.5	$3,692.08
Total valid votes		69,737			
Total rejected ballots		459			
Turnout		70,196	69.98		
Eligible voters		100,308			
Source: Elections Canada

2019 Canadian federal election: Northumberland—Peterborough South
Party	Candidate	Votes	%	±%	Expenditures
Conservative	Philip Lawrence	27,385	39.7	+0.14	$68,864.16
Liberal	Kim Rudd	24,977	36.2	-6.31	$83,715.67
New Democratic	Mallory MacDonald	9,615	13.9	-0.9	$8,871.55
Green	Jeff Wheeldon	5,524	8.0	+4.87	none listed
People's	Frank Vaughan	1,460	2.1	–	$1,643.34
Total valid votes/expense limit		68,961	100.0		
Total rejected ballots		484			
Turnout		69,445	71.7		
Eligible voters		96,841			
Conservative gain from Liberal		Swing		+3.23	
Source: Elections Canada
