= Northumberland—Quinte West =

Northumberland—Quinte West may refer to:

- Northumberland—Quinte West (federal electoral district)
- Northumberland—Quinte West (provincial electoral district)
