= Northumberland—Clarke =

Federal electoral district in Ontario, Canada

Coordinates: 44.16°N 78.11°W

Ontario electoral district
- Interactive map of riding boundaries from the 2025 federal election

Federal electoral district
- Legislature: House of Commons
MP
Philip Lawrence
Conservative
- District created: 2013
- First contested: 2015
- Last contested: 2025
- District webpage: profile, map

Demographics
- Population (2021): 118,756
- Electors (2021): 100,308
- Area (km²): 3,001
- Pop. density (per km²): 39.6
- Census division(s): Durham, Northumberland
- Census subdivision(s): Clarington (part), Cobourg, Port Hope, Trent Hills, Brighton, Hamilton, Alnwick/Haldimand, Cramahe, Alderville

Northumberland—Clarke (formerly Northumberland—Peterborough South) is a federal electoral district in Ontario.

Northumberland—Peterborough South was created by the 2012 federal electoral boundaries redistribution and was legally defined in the 2013 representation order. It came into effect upon the call of the 2025 Canadian federal election, held on 19 October 2015. 77% of the riding was formed from Northumberland—Quinte West, 13% from Durham and 10% from Peterborough. The riding was originally intended to be named Northumberland—Pine Ridge.

Under the 2022 Canadian federal electoral redistribution the riding lost its territory in Peterborough County, the townships of Asphodel-Norwood and Otonabee-South Monaghan, to the Peterborough riding. As such, it was renamed Northumberland—Clarke at the 2025 federal election.

== Geography ==
The riding is located in Central Ontario along Lake Ontario. It contains the entirety of Northumberland County and the eastern half of the municipality of Clarington.

== Demographics ==
According to the 2021 Canadian census; 2023 representation

Racial groups: 91.2% White, 3.5% Indigenous, 1.2% Black, 1.2% South Asian
Languages: 93.4% English, 1.7% French
Religions: 53.8% Christian (17.4% Catholic, 11.2% United Church, 7.8% Anglican, 2.5% Presbyterian, 2.0% Baptist, 1.2% Pentecostal, 11.8% Other), 43.9% None
Median income: $41,600 (2020)
Average income: $53,400 (2020)

== Members of Parliament ==
This riding has elected the following members of Parliament:

Parliament	Years	Member	Party
Northumberland—Peterborough South; Riding created from Durham, Northumberland—Quinte West and Peterborough
42nd	2015–2019	Kim Rudd	Liberal
43rd	2019–2021	Philip Lawrence	Conservative
44th	2021–2025	Philip Lawrence	Conservative
Northumberland—Clarke
45th	2025–present	Philip Lawrence	Conservative

== Election results ==
View source data.
Graph of election results in Northumberland—Peterborough South (minor parties that never got 2% of the vote or didn't run consistently are omitted)

2025 Canadian federal election
Party	Candidate	Votes	%	±%	Expenditures
Conservative	Philip Lawrence	34,862	48.97	+4.98	$108,538.24
Liberal	John Goheen	32,648	45.86	+11.84	$122,595.83
New Democratic	Ava Becker	2,090	2.94	–11.01	$606.19
Green	Christina Marie Wilson	630	0.88	–1.68	$2,119.90
People's	Lisa Bradburn	521	0.73	–4.74	$0.00
Independent	Jody Ledgerwood	270	0.38	N/A	$6,885.84
Christian Heritage	John Wesselius	171	0.24	N/A	$2,813.48
Total valid votes/expense limit		71,192	99.54	–	$140,428.69
Total rejected ballots		326	0.46	-0.22	
Turnout		71,518	74.99		
Eligible voters		95,368			
Conservative notional hold		Swing		–3.43	
Source: Elections Canada

2021 federal election redistributed results
Party	Vote	%
Conservative	27,553	43.99
Liberal	21,311	34.02
New Democratic	8,735	13.95
People's	3,430	5.48
Green	1,608	2.57
Total valid votes	62,637	99.32
Rejected ballots	428	0.68
Registered voters/ estimated turnout	90,435	69.74

2021 Canadian federal election: Northumberland—Peterborough South
Party	Candidate	Votes	%	±%	Expenditures
Conservative	Philip Lawrence	31,015	44.5	+4.8	$102,345.39
Liberal	Alison Lester	23,336	33.5	-2.7	$114,472.38
New Democratic	Kim McArthur-Jackson	9,809	14.1	+0.2	$7,800.16
People's	Nathan Lang	3,813	5.5	+3.4	$7,035.54
Green	Christina Wilson	1,764	2.5	-5.5	$3,692.08
Total valid votes		69,737			
Total rejected ballots		459			
Turnout		70,196	69.98		
Eligible voters		100,308			
Source: Elections Canada

2019 Canadian federal election: Northumberland—Peterborough South
Party	Candidate	Votes	%	±%	Expenditures
Conservative	Philip Lawrence	27,385	39.7	+0.14	$68,864.16
Liberal	Kim Rudd	24,977	36.2	-6.31	$83,715.67
New Democratic	Mallory MacDonald	9,615	13.9	-0.9	$8,871.55
Green	Jeff Wheeldon	5,524	8.0	+4.87	none listed
People's	Frank Vaughan	1,460	2.1	–	$1,643.34
Total valid votes/expense limit		68,961	100.0		
Total rejected ballots		484			
Turnout		69,445	71.7		
Eligible voters		96,841			
Conservative gain from Liberal		Swing		+3.23	
Source: Elections Canada

2015 Canadian federal election: Northumberland—Peterborough South
Party	Candidate	Votes	%	±%	Expenditures
Liberal	Kim Rudd	27,043	42.51	+21.42	$114,323.76
Conservative	Adam Moulton	25,165	39.56	-13.80	$135,349.14
New Democratic	Russ Christianson	9,411	14.80	-5.79	$41,225.56
Green	Patricia Sinnott	1,990	3.13	-1.55	$1,350.03
Total valid votes/Expense limit		63,609	100.00		$229,426.74
Total rejected ballots		267	0.42	–	
Turnout		63,876	71.67	–	
Eligible voters		89,128			
Liberal gain from Conservative		Swing		+17.61	
Source: Elections Canada

2011 federal election redistributed results
Party	Vote	%
Conservative	29,377	53.37
Liberal	11,611	21.09
New Democratic	11,331	20.58
Green	2,576	4.68
Others	154	0.28

== See also ==
- List of Canadian electoral districts
- Historical federal electoral districts of Canada
