= Kim Rudd =

Canadian politician and businesswoman (1957–2024)

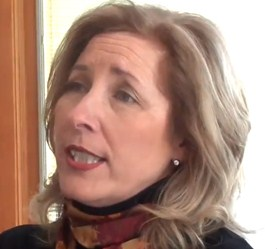

Parliamentary Secretary to the Minister of Natural Resources
- In office December 2, 2015 – August 30, 2018
- Minister: Jim Carr
- Preceded by: Kelly Block

Member of Parliament for Northumberland—Peterborough South
- In office October 19, 2015 – September 11, 2019
- Preceded by: Rick Norlock
- Succeeded by: Philip Lawrence

Personal details
- Born: November 18, 1957
- Died: March 12, 2024 (aged 66) Cobourg, Ontario, Canada
- Party: Liberal
- Spouse: Tom Rudd
- Children: 2

Kim Elizabeth Rudd (November 18, 1957 – March 12, 2024) was a Canadian politician and businesswoman. She was elected a Member of Parliament for Northumberland – Peterborough South in 2015 and served as Parliamentary Secretary to the Minister of Natural Resources from 2015 to 2018.

Rudd was a past president and owner of Willis College in Cobourg, Ontario, a former owner of Cook's Day School, and a past president of the Northumberland Central Chamber of Commerce.

== Career ==
Before becoming involved in politics as a career, Rudd was a long-time advocate of childcare and previously worked on the creation of daycares in Cobourg, Ontario. She was a former owner of Cook's Day School, Willis College, and Archer CPR Training.

In 2011, Rudd was among six award recipients of the RBC Canadian Women Entrepreneur Award. Contributions to economies locally, nationally, and globally were among the criteria for winning the award. Rudd was a consultant at the Canadian Nuclear Association.

In 2020, Rudd joined the Advisory Board for Arnprior Aerospace Inc. She served as the President of the Northumberland Central Chamber of Commerce, Chair of the Physician Recruitment and Retention Committee of Northumberland, Vice-Chair of the Ontario Training Completion Assurance Fund Secretariat, Vice-President of the Association of Career Colleges and as the founding Executive Director of the Association of Private Colleges.

=== Political career ===
After an unsuccessful bid to become a Member of Parliament in the 2011 Canadian federal election, Rudd was elected in 2015 to the House of Commons of Canada to represent the riding of Northumberland – Peterborough South. She also served as Parliamentary Secretary to the Minister of Natural Resources from 2015 to 2018 when she announced she chose to step down to better represent her riding; while stepping down from Parliamentary Secretary, Rudd declared she would not be ruling out future opportunities for more responsibility in future government. On October 1, 2018, Rudd was named the chair of the Parliamentary Health Research Caucus and served as a member of the standing committees on finance and natural resources.

Rudd opposed eliminating a tax on heating fuel and supported tax credits such as the Canada Child Tax Credit. She said that eliminating a tax on heating fuel would have varying degrees of impact on people living in different parts of Canada and that the Canada Child Tax Credit would be more universal.

Rudd said she supported improving the Canada Pension Plan and increasing benefits to widows.

She ran for reelection and was defeated in the 2019 Canadian federal election by more than 2,500 votes.

== Personal life and death ==
Kim Elizabeth Rudd was born on November 18, 1957. When she was growing up, her alcoholic father had to quit work after an accident, so her mother started working at a more demanding job, which led to Rudd having significant household responsibilities as a child. She had Métis ancestry via her maternal grandfather.

Rudd and her husband Tom Rudd had two daughters, Alison and Stefanie. They adopted Alison.

Kim Rudd died of ovarian cancer at a hospice in Cobourg, Ontario, on March 12, 2024, at the age of 66.

== Electoral record ==
2019 Canadian federal election: Northumberland—Peterborough South
Party	Candidate	Votes	%	±%	Expenditures
Conservative	Philip Lawrence	27,385	39.7	+0.14	$68,864.16
Liberal	Kim Rudd	24,977	36.2	-6.31	$83,715.67
New Democratic	Mallory MacDonald	9,615	13.9	-0.9	$8,871.55
Green	Jeff Wheeldon	5,524	8.0	+4.87	none listed
People's	Frank Vaughan	1,460	2.1	–	$1,643.34
Total valid votes/expense limit		68,961	100.0		
Total rejected ballots		484			
Turnout		69,445	71.7		
Eligible voters		96,841			
Conservative gain from Liberal		Swing		+3.23	
Source: Elections Canada

2015 Canadian federal election: Northumberland—Peterborough South
Party	Candidate	Votes	%	±%	Expenditures
Liberal	Kim Rudd	27,043	42.51	+21.42	$114,323.76
Conservative	Adam Moulton	25,165	39.56	-13.80	$135,349.14
New Democratic	Russ Christianson	9,411	14.80	-5.79	$41,225.56
Green	Patricia Sinnott	1,990	3.13	-1.55	$1,350.03
Total valid votes/Expense limit		63,609	100.00		$229,426.74
Total rejected ballots		267	0.42	–	
Turnout		63,876	71.67	–	
Eligible voters		89,128			
Liberal gain from Conservative		Swing		+17.61	
Source: Elections Canada

2011 Canadian federal election: Northumberland—Quinte West (federal electoral district)
Party	Candidate	Votes	%	±%
Conservative	Rick Norlock	32,853	53.83	+5.11
Liberal	Kim Rudd	12,822	21.01	-7.59
New Democratic	Russ Christianson	12,626	20.69	+6.17
Green	Ralph Torrie	2,733	4.48	-3.70
Total valid votes/expense limit		61,034		
Total rejected ballots		184	0.30	-0.03
Turnout		61,218	64.64	
Eligible voters		96,154		
Source: Elections Canada
