= Canadians for Equal Marriage =

Canadian public interest group founded in 2002

Canadians for Equal Marriage is a Canadian public interest group founded in 2002. It represents Egale Canada, PFLAG Canada, the Canadian Federation of Students, the Canadian Labour Congress, the Canadian Psychological Association, the Canadian Association of University Teachers, and the Canadian Association of Social Workers, among others to promote the legalisation of same-sex marriage in Canada. It has been relatively inactive since its goals were achieved with the passage and acceptance of the Civil Marriage Act in 2005.
