= Conscience vote =

Discretionary votes, particularly in parliamentary systems

A conscience vote or free vote is a type of vote in a legislative body where legislators are allowed to vote according to their own personal conscience rather than according to an official line set down by their political party. In a parliamentary system, especially within the Westminster system, it can also be used to indicate crossbench members of a hung parliament, where confidence and supply is provided to allow formation of a minority government but the right to vote on conscience is retained. Free votes are found in Canadian and some British legislative bodies; conscience votes are used in Australian legislative bodies; personal votes can be held in the New Zealand Parliament.

Under the Westminster system, MPs who belong to a political party are usually required by that party to vote in accordance with the party line on significant legislation, or risk censure or expulsion from the party. Sometimes a particular party member known as the party whip is responsible for maintaining this party discipline. However, in the case of a conscience vote, a party does not dictate an official party line to follow and members may vote as they please. Sometimes a vote may be free for some parties but not for others. In countries where party discipline is less important and voting against one's party is more common, conscience votes are generally less important.

In most countries, conscience votes are quite rare and are often about issues that are very contentious, or a matter on which the members of any single party differ in their opinions, thus making it difficult for parties to formulate official policies. Usually, a conscience vote will be about religious, moral or ethical issues rather than about administrative or financial ones. Matters such as the prohibition of alcohol, abortion, homosexuality law reform and the legality of prostitution are often subject to conscience votes.

== Practice in various countries ==
=== Australia ===
Conscience votes have been held in the Australian Parliament and in State Parliaments on issues of becoming a republic, abortion, euthanasia, homosexuality, sex discrimination, prostitution, and bioethical issues like assisted reproduction and stem cell research, besides other issues.

=== Canada ===
The decision to grant a free vote lies with party leaders in Canada. Sometimes a vote may be free for some parties but not for others. For instance, when the Conservative government of Prime Minister Stephen Harper proposed a motion to re-open the debate on Canada's same-sex marriage laws, his Conservatives and the opposition Liberals declared it a free vote for their members, while the Bloc Québécois and the New Democrats both maintained party discipline to defeat the measure.

=== New Zealand ===
In the New Zealand Parliament, the Speaker decides if a vote will be a personal vote. They may do so after any MP requests it following a contested voice vote. The Speaker usually agrees to such a request, but not always. A personal vote differs from a party vote in that MPs must physically enter a lobby to vote on a motion, rather than a party's whip calling out the votes on behalf of its MPs. Legislation that was treated as a conscience issue includes the Homosexual Law Reform Act 1986, Prostitution Reform Act 2003, Crimes (Substituted Section 59) Amendment Act 2007, Marriage (Definition of Marriage) Amendment Act 2013, End of Life Choice Act 2019 and Abortion Legislation Act 2020. The most common topic for conscience votes in New Zealand has been alcohol; a conscience vote relating to alcohol has happened every decade since the 1890s.

In the case of a party vote, a party can decide to allow its members to vote differently from one another, in a split party vote. Thus individual parties can allow their members a conscience vote even when the Speaker has not declared a personal vote.

=== United Kingdom ===
In the British House of Commons there used to be a conscience vote every few years on the restoration of the death penalty, which had been abolished in 1964 (except for treason, for which it was abolished in 1998 in the Human Rights Act). It had always been rejected and this practice has now been abandoned. In Britain, laws concerning abortion have always been subject to a free vote.

The proposed bans on hunting with dogs proposed by Tony Blair's government were the subject of several free votes in Parliament from 2001. On each occasion the Commons voted for a ban and the House of Lords rejected it. In 2004 the Government, trying to placate the Lords and other opponents of a ban, proposed only restriction and licensing of hunting, but anti-hunting MPs (mostly Labour backbenchers) forced through an amendment that would effect a total ban. Seconds after the vote on the amendment, the Government bowed to pressure and agreed to force the ban through the Lords under the Parliament Acts 1911 and 1949. It passed in November 2004.

Other decisions that were taken by a free vote include abandoning the experiment with permanent summer time and bringing television cameras into Parliament.

=== United States ===
In the United States, parties exercise comparatively little control over the votes of individual legislators. However, the parties' whips offer varying amounts of incentives or disincentives to unite the party on major votes. As an extreme case, Democrat James Traficant was stripped of his seniority and committee assignments in 2001 when he voted for a Republican, Dennis Hastert, to be Speaker of the United States House of Representatives.

When a party's leadership declines to whip votes in a situation where they normally would, this is sometimes called a "conscience vote," "vote of conscience," or members "voting their consciences." For instance, an aide to Senate Minority Whip Dick Durbin said that "Decisions about war and peace are conscience votes and they aren’t whipped traditionally," regarding the potential disapproval of the Iran nuclear agreement. Similarly, when House Republican leadership decided not to whip votes against the second impeachment of Donald Trump, Liz Cheney—the third-highest-ranking Republican—referred to the matter as a "vote of conscience". At other times the terms are used to describe a vote based on personal morals rather than political considerations.

== See also ==
- Aisle (political term)
- Crossing the floor
- Party switching
