= Paul Macklin =

Canadian politician

Paul Macklin PC MP

Member of Parliament for Northumberland—Quinte West Northumberland (2000–2004)
- In office November 27, 2000 – November 29, 2005
- Preceded by: Riding established
- Succeeded by: Rick Norlock

Personal details
- Born: Paul Harold Macklin; May 22, 1944 (age 82) Northumberland County, Ontario, Canada
- Party: Liberal
- Education: University of Western Ontario (BA); University of Windsor

Paul Harold Macklin, PC, MP (born May 22, 1944) is a Canadian politician. He was a member of the House of Commons of Canada, representing the riding of Northumberland—Quinte West of the Liberal Party caucus from 2000 to 2006.

Macklin has a Bachelor of Arts degree from the University of Western Ontario, and a law degree from the University of Windsor. After being called to the bar, Macklin worked for the Toronto firm of Davies, Ward & Beck.

He was first elected to Parliament in the federal election of 2000, winning a fairly easily victory over his Canadian Alliance and Progressive Conservative opponents in the riding of Northumberland. The CA and PC parties merged in late 2003, and Macklin faced a much more difficult challenge in that year's federal election, defeating Conservative Doug Galt by only 313 votes.

Macklin served as Parliamentary Secretary to the Minister of Justice and Attorney General of Canada from February 2002 to December 2003, and was re-appointed to the position on July 20, 2004.

He was defeated by Conservative Rick Norlock in the 2006 election. Macklin was acclaimed as the Liberal candidate for the riding of Northumberland-Quinte West for the 2008 election, and was again defeated by Norlock.

In July 2009, Paul Macklin announced he would not seek the Liberal nomination in Northumberland-Quinte West for the next election. The following September his successor was determined by a Liberal nomination race and Cobourg business woman Kim Rudd was chosen to succeed Macklin.

Paul Macklin currently sits on the Northumberland-Quinte West Federal Liberal Association as the Policy Director, still active in politics and a key advisor to Rudd and her campaign.

== Electoral record ==
2000 Canadian federal election: Northumberland
Party	Candidate	Votes
Liberal	Paul Macklin	20,109
Alliance	Rick Norlock	11,410
Progressive Conservative	Ralph James Zarboni	8,768
New Democratic	Ben Burd	2,141
Green	Tom Lawson	1,102
Canadian Action	Gail Thompson	276

2004 Canadian federal election: Northumberland—Quinte West (federal electoral district)
Party	Candidate	Votes	%
Liberal	Paul Macklin	22,989	39.85
Conservative	Doug Galt	22,676	39.31
New Democratic	Russ Christianson	9,007	15.61
Green	Steven Haylestrom	3,016	5.23
Total valid votes		57,688	100.00

2006 Canadian federal election: Northumberland—Quinte West (federal electoral district)
Party	Candidate	Votes	%	±%
Conservative	Rick Norlock	25,833	41.21	+1.91
Liberal	Paul Macklin	22,566	36.00	-3.85
New Democratic	Russ Christianson	11,334	18.08	+2.47
Green	Pat Lawson	2,946	4.70	-0.53
Total valid votes		62,679	100.00	

2008 Canadian federal election: Northumberland—Quinte West (federal electoral district)
Party	Candidate	Votes	%	±%	Expenditures
Conservative	Rick Norlock	27,615	48.71	+7.50	$84,880
Liberal	Paul Macklin	16,209	28.59	-7.41	$83,766
New Democratic	Russ Christianson	8,230	14.52	-3.56	$20,947
Green	Ralph Torrie	4,633	8.17	+3.47	$34,300
Total valid votes/expense limit		56,687	100.00	$93,766	
Total rejected ballots		186	0.33		
Turnout		56,873			
