= Rick Norlock =

Canadian politician

Member of Parliament for Northumberland—Quinte West
- In office January 23, 2006 – August 4, 2015
- Preceded by: Paul Macklin
- Succeeded by: Kim Rudd

Personal details
- Born: Richard Norlock; March 7, 1948 (age 78) Chapleau, Ontario, Canada
- Party: Conservative (2003–present)
- Other political affiliations: Canadian Alliance (2000–2003)
- Spouse: Judy Norlock
- Profession: Police officer

Richard Norlock (born March 7, 1948) served as the Conservative Member of Parliament (MP) for the riding of Northumberland—Quinte West in the House of Commons of Canada from 2006 to 2015.

== Career ==
Norlock worked for the Ontario Provincial Police as a police officer for over 30 years.

He has been the president of the Warkworth Community Service Club, and the director of the Campbellford Rotary Club. He is a board member of the Social Housing Authority in Cobourg, a former member of the Ontario Film Review Board, a board member of the Rocky Mountain Elk Foundation Quinte Chapter, and a member of the Royal Canadian Legion. He is the past president of the Conservative Party of Canada Northumberland—Quinte West Electoral District Association.

Norlock ran in the 2000 federal election for the Canadian Alliance in Northumberland. In that election, Norlock finished second behind Paul Macklin of the Liberal Party of Canada by 8,699 votes.

In the 2006 federal election, Norlock was elected in Northumberland—Quinte West. He was re-elected in 2008 and 2011 and retired from parliament at the 2015 federal election.

== Controversial use of mailouts ==
A rule allowing MPs to send mail to voters outside their riding, called 'ten-per-centers', brought special attention to Norlock. He was noted as the highest spending MP in the House of Commons at $87,749 on mailouts; almost five times more than the opposition MPs ($17,977) and more than double the average Conservative MP ($38,887).
