= Northumberland—Quinte West (federal electoral district) =

Former federal electoral district in Ontario, Canada

Coordinates: 44.07°N 77.79°W

Ontario electoral district
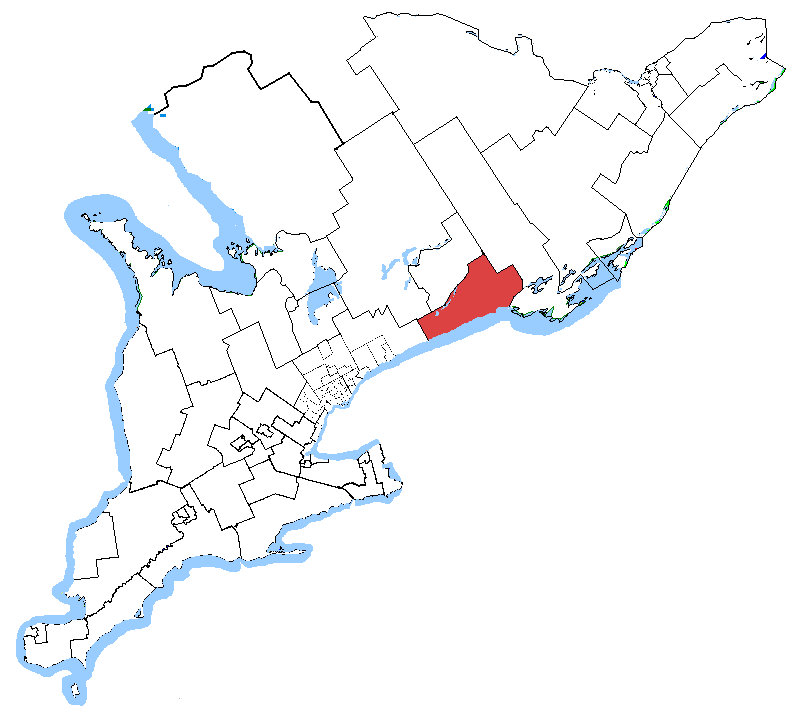
- Northumberland—Quinte West in relation to southern Ontario ridings

Defunct federal electoral district
- Legislature: House of Commons
- District created: 2003
- District abolished: 2013
- First contested: 2004
- Last contested: 2011
- District webpage: profile, map

Demographics
- Population (2011): 125,261
- Electors (2011): 93,620
- Area (km²): 2,404.45
- Census division(s): Hastings County, Northumberland County
- Census subdivision(s): Alnwick/Haldimand, Brighton Cobourg, Cramahe, Hamilton (township), Port Hope, Quinte West, Trent Hills

Northumberland—Quinte West was a federal electoral district in Ontario, Canada, that was represented in the House of Commons of Canada from 2004 to 2013. Its population in 2001 was 118,906. Following the Canadian federal electoral redistribution, 2012, the electoral district was dissolved into the ridings of Northumberland—Peterborough South and Bay of Quinte.

== Geography ==
The district included the County of Northumberland and the City of Quinte West.

== History ==
The electoral district was created in 2003: 86.1% of the riding came from Northumberland riding and 13.9% from Prince Edward—Hastings riding.

== Federal electoral redistribution ==
Following the passage of the Fair Representation Act on December 16, 2011, an additional 30 seats were added to the Canadian House of Commons.

The boundary changes first proposed for Northumberland—Quinte West would have seen significant changes to the riding. The County of Northumberland, while still composing a majority of the riding, was to not be reflected in the new name. Instead, the new electoral district was to be called Prince Edward-Quinte West. Furthermore, the town of Cobourg, township of Hamilton, and municipality of Port Hope was to be transferred to the new riding of Kawartha Lakes-Port Hope-Cobourg. Under the proposed riding changes, Northumberland County would have been split into two separate ridings. The Federal Electoral Boundaries Commission for Ontario defined the proposed boundaries of Prince Edward-Quinte West as consisting of:

- the City of Prince Edward;
- the City of Quinte West; and
- the County of Northumberland, excepting: the Township of Hamilton; the Town of Cobourg; the Municipality of Port Hope.

The proposed boundary changes would also have reduced the overall population of the riding. The current electoral district of Northumberland—Quinte West had a population of 125,261 people whereas the proposed riding of Prince Edward-Quinte West would have had a population of 105,035.

The elimination of the word "Northumberland" in the proposed riding was the source of heavy criticism. Critics argue that the division of Northumberland County into two distinct political districts as well as the loss of the county's name in the riding title would have had significant negative impacts on the community. "The proposed changes will have significant negative impacts on the future prosperity of Northumberland County by eliminating the name Northumberland completely from the electoral map," Trent Hills Mayor Hector Macmillan said in an interview with Northumberland Today. Furthermore, Bill Pyatt, CAO of Northumberland County Council, said the proposed boundary changes to area electoral districts "will have significant negative impacts on the future prosperity of Northumberland County."

Widespread dissatisfaction with the proposed boundaries caused the online petition 1NORTHUMBERLAND to circulate in an attempt to keep Northumberland in the name and united under one electoral district. As The petition had the support of at least 800 households in the riding, representing about 2,000 people. The petition was submitted to the Federal Electoral Boundaries Commission for Ontario.

The Federal Electoral Boundaries Commission for Ontario held a public hearing on November 12, 2012, to receive input on the proposed boundary changes. Member of Parliament for Northumberland—Quinte West, Rick Norlock, Cramahae Township Mayor Marc Coombs, former MPP Lou Rinaldi, and past president of the Northumberland Federation of Agriculture, Paul Burnham all spoke against the commission's proposed boundary changes.

Northumberland County Council CAO, Bill Pyatt, presented two alternatives to the commission's boundary proposal. The first alternative would see Northumberland County join the Township of Cavan-Millbrook-North Monaghan and Clarington's Ward 4 to create the riding of "Northumberland-Pine Ridge" with an approximate population of 107,000. The second alternative would see Northumberland and the Townships of Asphodel-Norwood, Otonabee-South Monaghan and Cavan-Millbrook-North Monaghan become the riding of "Northumberland-South Peterborough", with an approximate population 106,000. It was believed that the population figures would be in line with Commission's goal to reduce riding populations.

The Commission accepted these criticisms and restored Northumberland County's riding as Northumberland—Pine Ridge, which was later renamed Northumberland—Peterborough South.

== Members of Parliament ==
This riding has elected the following members of Parliament:

Parliament	Years	Member	Party
Northumberland—Quinte West; Riding created from Northumberland and Prince Edward—Hastings
38th	2004–2006	Paul Macklin	Liberal
39th	2006–2008	Rick Norlock	Conservative
40th	2008–2011	Rick Norlock	Conservative
41st	2011–2015	Rick Norlock	Conservative
Riding dissolved into Northumberland—Peterborough South and Bay of Quinte

== Election results ==
2004 Canadian federal election: Northumberland—Quinte West
Party	Candidate	Votes	%
Liberal	Paul Macklin	22,989	39.85
Conservative	Doug Galt	22,676	39.31
New Democratic	Russ Christianson	9,007	15.61
Green	Steven Haylestrom	3,016	5.23
Total valid votes		57,688	100.00

2006 Canadian federal election: Northumberland—Quinte West
Party	Candidate	Votes	%	±%
Conservative	Rick Norlock	25,833	41.21	+1.91
Liberal	Paul Macklin	22,566	36.00	-3.85
New Democratic	Russ Christianson	11,334	18.08	+2.47
Green	Pat Lawson	2,946	4.70	-0.53
Total valid votes		62,679	100.00	

2008 Canadian federal election: Northumberland—Quinte West
Party	Candidate	Votes	%	±%	Expenditures
Conservative	Rick Norlock	27,615	48.71	+7.50	$84,880
Liberal	Paul Macklin	16,209	28.59	-7.41	$83,766
New Democratic	Russ Christianson	8,230	14.52	-3.56	$20,947
Green	Ralph Torrie	4,633	8.17	+3.47	$34,300
Total valid votes/expense limit		56,687	100.00	$93,766	
Total rejected ballots		186	0.33		
Turnout		56,873			

2011 Canadian federal election: Northumberland—Quinte West
Party	Candidate	Votes	%	±%
Conservative	Rick Norlock	32,853	53.83	+5.11
Liberal	Kim Rudd	12,822	21.01	-7.59
New Democratic	Russ Christianson	12,626	20.69	+6.17
Green	Ralph Torrie	2,733	4.48	-3.70
Total valid votes/expense limit		61,034		
Total rejected ballots		184	0.30	-0.03
Turnout		61,218	64.64	
Eligible voters		96,154		
Source: Elections Canada

== See also ==
- List of Canadian electoral districts
- Historical federal electoral districts of Canada
