= Civil Marriage Act =

2005 Canadian law legalizing same-sex marriage

Parliament of Canada
- Long title: An Act respecting certain aspects of legal capacity for marriage for civil purposes
- Citation: S.C. 2005, c. 33
- Territorial extent: Canada
- Passed by: House of Commons
- Passed: 28 June 2005
- Passed by: Senate
- Passed: 19 July 2005
- Assented to by: Beverley McLachlin
- Assented to: 20 July 2005
- Commenced: 20 July 2005

Legislative history

Initiating chamber: House of Commons
- Bill title: Bill C-38, 38th Parliament, 1st Session
- Bill citation: Bill C-38, 2005
- Introduced by: Irwin Cotler, Minister of Justice
- Committee responsible: Legislative Committee on Bill C-38
- First reading: 1 February 2005
- Second reading: 4 May 2005
- Voting summary: 164 voted for; 137 voted against; 7 absent
- Considered by the Legislative Committee on Bill C-38 Committee: 16 June 2005
- Third reading: 28 June 2005
- Voting summary: 158 voted for; 133 voted against; 17 absent
- Committee report: C38 Committee Report

Revising chamber: Senate
- Member(s) in charge: Serge Joyal
- First reading: 29 June 2005
- Second reading: 6 July 2005
- Considered in committee: 18 July 2005
- Third reading: 19 July 2005
- Committee report: Twelfth Report

Summary
- "This enactment extends the legal capacity for marriage for civil purposes to same-sex couples in order to reflect values of tolerance, respect and equality, consistent with the Canadian Charter of Rights and Freedoms. It also makes consequential amendments to other Acts to ensure equal access for same-sex couples to the civil effects of marriage and divorce."

Keywords
- Same-sex marriage
- Status: In force

The Civil Marriage Act (French: Loi sur le mariage civil) is a federal statute legalizing same-sex marriage across Canada. At the time it became law, same-sex marriage had already been legalized by court decisions in all Canadian jurisdictions except Alberta, Prince Edward Island, the Northwest Territories, and Nunavut.

It was introduced as Bill C-38 in the first session of the 38th Canadian Parliament on February 1, 2005. It passed the House of Commons on June 28, 2005, and the Senate on July 19, 2005. The Act became law when it received Royal Assent on July 20, 2005.

== Outline of the Act ==
This is the Act's official legislative summary:

This enactment extends the legal capacity for marriage for civil purposes to same-sex couples in order to reflect values of tolerance, respect and equality, consistent with the Canadian Charter of Rights and Freedoms. It also makes consequential amendments to other Acts to ensure equal access for same-sex couples to the civil effects of marriage and divorce.

The short title (Civil Marriage Act) is defined in Section 1. Sections 2 through 4 form the substance of the Act, and were the key points of contention during its debate in the House of Commons and the Senate. Section 3.1 was added with an amendment during the committee stage and was subsequently adopted by the House of Commons.

Marriage - certain aspects of capacity

2. Marriage, for civil purposes, is the lawful union of two persons to the exclusion of all others.

Religious officials

3. It is recognized that officials of religious groups are free to refuse to perform marriages that are not in accordance with their religious beliefs.

Freedom of conscience and religion and expression of beliefs

3.1 For greater certainty, no person or organization shall be deprived of any benefit, or be subject to any obligation or sanction, under any law of the Parliament of Canada solely by reason of their exercise, in respect of marriage between persons of the same sex, of the freedom of conscience and religion guaranteed under the Canadian Charter of Rights and Freedoms or the expression of their beliefs in respect of marriage as the union of a man and woman to the exclusion of all others based on that guaranteed freedom.

Marriage not void or voidable

4. For greater certainty, a marriage is not void or voidable by reason only that the spouses are of the same sex.

The remaining sections are "consequential amendments" that simply adjust the wording of existing acts to conform to this one.

== Politics ==
As a government bill, C-38 represented the official position of Paul Martin's Liberal government and the cabinet were thus bound to vote in its favour. Liberal backbenchers and members of the Conservative Party and Bloc Québécois had a free vote. In accordance with its party policy on LGBT rights, the New Democratic Party (NDP) whipped its members in favour. Bev Desjarlais defied the whip and was removed from her critic position. (She was not nominated for the next election by her riding association, and subsequently chose to sit as an independent for the remainder of the session.) Conservatives tended to vote against the Act, while Bloquistes tended to vote in favour. At least two cabinet ministers stepped down to vote against the bill. Joe Comuzzi resigned just hours before the final vote on the Act, and Martin lamented his leaving. As expected, Comuzzi voted against the Act.

The composition of Parliament was such that the prevailing opinion among political commentators indicated the bill would likely pass the House (see a detailed analysis at members of the 38th Canadian Parliament and same-sex marriage). Although there was some challenge to it, this opinion was verified with a 158–133 vote at third reading in the House of Commons on June 28. The bill passed in the Senate on July 19, with a 47–21 vote, with three abstentions.

=== The legislative process ===
The bill was given its first reading on February 1, 2005, after its introduction by Justice minister Irwin Cotler. C-38 was written on the basis of a draft bill produced by then-Justice minister Martin Cauchon in 2003, which had been submitted to the Supreme Court of Canada in December 2004 as the reference question Re: Same-Sex Marriage.

Due to the government's tenuous minority position, there was a strong possibility that the government could have fallen on a motion of confidence through the budget bills, causing the bill to die on the order paper. It would then have been up to a new post-election government to re-introduce the bill affirming same-sex marriage (or to introduce a bill, of uncertain constitutionality, defining marriage as one man and one woman). However, the government survived the last of the budget votes on June 23, 2005, and successfully passed a motion to extend the current sitting of Parliament. In order to pass the motion extending the session, the Liberals provided a written promise to the Bloc Québécois that they would bring C-38 to a vote before the end of the current session.

Finally, on June 28, the Act was passed on third reading by the House of Commons; 158 voting in favour, 133 voting against. On July 19, it passed the Senate by a 47–21 vote with three abstentions and received royal assent (thereby becoming law) on July 20.

A summary of the legislation's progress is given below.

Stage	House of Commons	Senate
Introduction and First Reading	1 February 2005	June 29
Second Reading Debate	February 16 to May 4	July 4 to 6
Second Reading	May 4	July 6
Committee Name	Special Committee on Bill C-38	Standing Committee on Legal and Constitutional Affairs
Committee Stage	May 5 to June 15	July 11 to 14
Committee Report	June 16	July 18
Debates at Report Stage	June 27	–
Report Stage Vote	June 28	–
Third Reading Debate	June 28	July 19
Third Reading and Passage	June 28	July 19
Royal Assent	July 20	

== Chronology ==
=== House of Commons ===
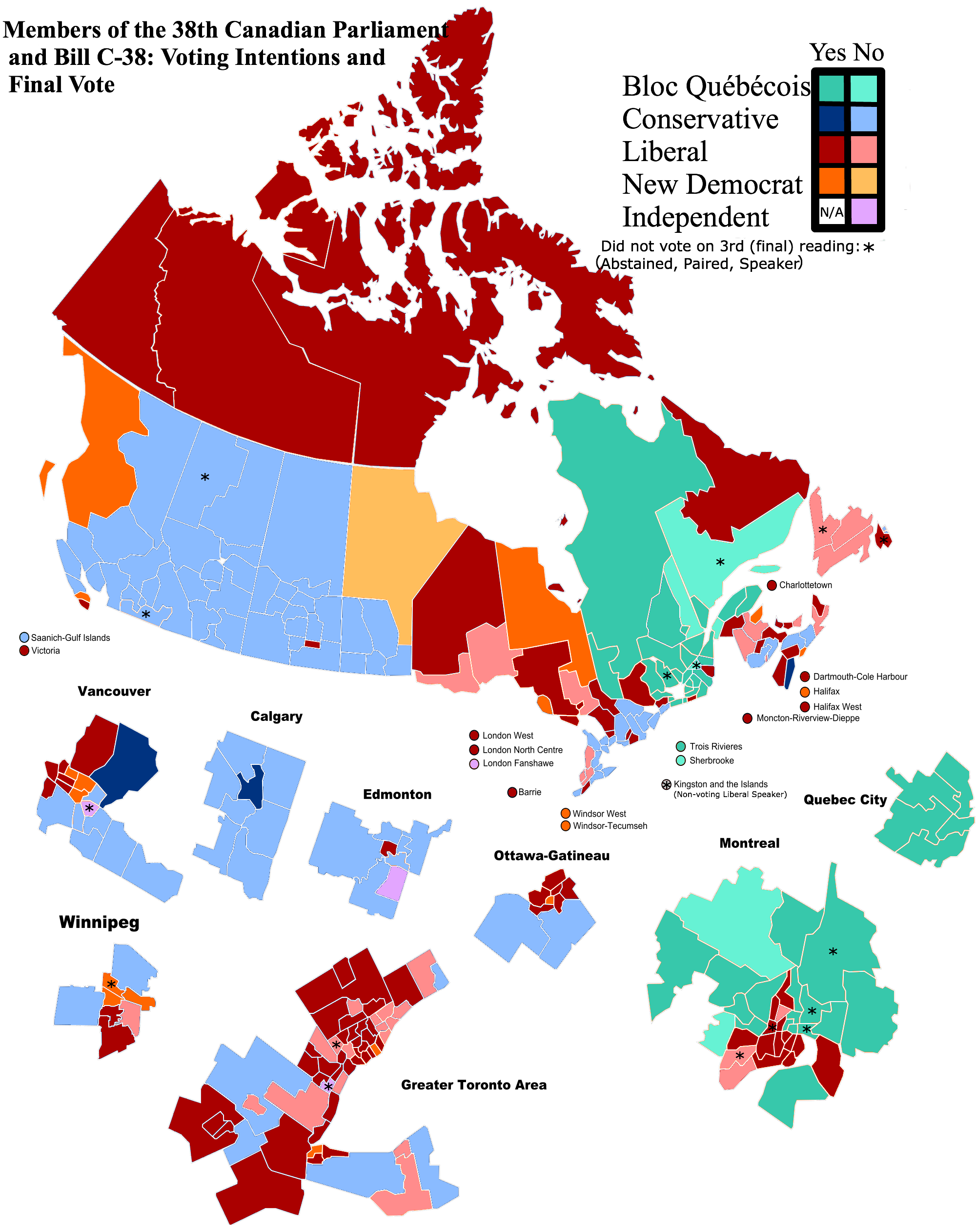
Result of the third and final reading of Bill C-38 in the House of Commons

- February 1, 2005 – Cotler introduces the bill and the House grants first reading. Accordingly, it is designated Bill C-38 and published.
- February 2, 2005 – Conservative support for the bill doubles to four MPs as former Progressive Conservatives Jim Prentice and Gerald Keddy announce they will vote in favour. Belinda Stronach (who later became a Liberal cabinet minister) and James Moore were already on record as being in favour.
- February 8, 2005 – The Calgary-based Canada Family Action Coalition seeks to boycott Famous Players Theatres because of a ten-second ad that urged moviegoers to contact their MPs to say they support same-sex marriage. They refused to buy an ad when they learn it was paid for by Salah Bachir on behalf of Canadians for Equal Marriage.
- February 16, 2005 – Second reading begins on the bill with speeches by Prime Minister Paul Martin; Opposition Leader Stephen Harper; Bloc Québécois leader Gilles Duceppe; and NDP human rights critic Bill Siksay.
- April 12, 2005 – The Conservative Party's motion against the bill is defeated 164–132 against.
- May 4, 2005 – Bill C-38 passes second reading in the House of Commons with a final vote of 164–137 for.
- May 5, 2005 – Bill C-38 has its 1st special legislative committee meeting to study the bill, to listen from witnesses both against and for the bill, as well as propose amendments.
- May 19, 2005 – Paul Martin's minority government survives a close (153–152) motion of confidence; with the Liberals still in power and Stephen Harper's Conservatives hinting that they'll back off future votes of no-confidence. Bill C-38 showed a strong promise of being made law (after a third reading and vote) sometime before Parliament adjourns for the summer as the Prime Minister indicated MPs may sit in the summer, and the Senate would deal with the bill in July.
- June 15, 2005 – Paul Martin's minority government survives no fewer than 16 confidence votes in the House of Commons. A defeat on any of them would have forced an election. But in the end, there was no repeat of the single-vote squeaker win of May 19.
- June 16, 2005 – The special legislative committee studying C-38 reported back to the House of Commons, with an amendment designed to help further protect religious officials who are against performing a same-sex marriage.
- June 23, 2005 – MPs of the Liberal, Bloc and NDP parties vote to extend the sitting time through the following week to pass Bill C-38 in third and final reading. The same night, the budget bill (Bill C-48) passes after a late night snap vote is called, ending the threat by Bill C-38 opponents to derail the bill by defeating the budget thereby bringing down the government and forcing a general election.
- June 27, 2005 – A late night motion for time allocation is passed 163 to 106 limiting further debate on Bill C-38 to nine hours: one before concurrence on the report and eight thereafter. The sitting, which extended until the early morning hours of the next day, ends with a series of votes on proposed amendments in which nine amendments proposed by same-sex marriage opponents are defeated. The report is then concurred in. This closes the amendment stage and frees the House to begin final debate on third reading.
- June 28, 2005 – Bill C-38 passes its final reading a few minutes after 21:00 EST, 158–133, through the House of Commons. Liberal cabinet ministers were ordered by Prime Minister Paul Martin to vote for the legislation, while it remained a free vote for Liberal backbench MPs. Joe Comuzzi, a traditional opponent of same-sex marriage, resigned from Cabinet and voted against the bill. Almost all New Democrat and Bloc Québécois MPs voted in favour of the bill, while the Conservative MPs were virtually unanimous in voting against it (three voted in favour). Conservative Leader Stephen Harper made a controversial claim that "the law lacks legitimacy because it passed [only] with the support of the separatist Bloc party." NDP MP Bev Desjarlais voted against the bill and was stripped of her position in the NDP's shadow cabinet as Transport and the Canadian Wheat Board critic. She later lost her riding association's nomination for the riding of Churchill. The Bloc and the Conservatives declared C-38 a free vote.

=== Senate ===
- June 29, 2005 – First reading of Bill C-38 occurred in the Senate. Debate on second reading was then scheduled for July 4 and the forthcoming days.
- July 4, 2005 – The debate on second reading begins with Senator Serge Joyal as mover of the bill. Senator Gerry St. Germain argues against the bill and Senator Jack Austin concludes the first day of debate arguing for the bill's adoption. The government introduces a notice of motion for time allocation that would restrict debate on the bill to six hours. Debate on second reading is to continue the next day.
- July 5, 2005 – Debate on second reading continued, although the actual debate occurred only for a few minutes. This was then followed by a long and heated debate on whether to invoke closure (rather than on the main bill). Closure was invoked by a margin of 40 to 17 with 2 abstentions.
- July 6, 2005 – The Senate passed Bill C-38 on second reading by a margin of 43 to 12. The Bill went to the Committee on Legal and Constitutional Affairs.
- July 14, 2005 – The Committee on Legal and Constitutional Affairs finished seeing witnesses, and performed a clause-by-clause consideration.
- July 18, 2005 – The Committee reported back to the Senate without amendment, and the final debate was then scheduled to start the next day. Unanimous consent required to proceed directly to a vote on third reading was denied.
- July 19, 2005 – Debate on third reading of Bill C-38 began in the Senate. An attempt to delay third reading of the bill by six months was defeated 19 to 52, and an amendment to the bill that would have declared "traditional marriage" as being between a man and a woman and "civil marriage" as between two persons failed, 24 to 46, with 4 abstentions. Shortly after 11 p.m., the Senate passed Bill C-38 on third and final reading by a margin of 47 to 21, with 3 abstentions.

=== Royal Assent ===
- July 20, 2005 – At 4:56 p.m., Bill C-38 receives Royal Assent from Chief Justice Beverley McLachlin (in her capacity as Administrator of the Government of Canada) acting on behalf of convalescing Governor General Adrienne Clarkson and is proclaimed into law.

== See also ==
- Members of the 38th Canadian Parliament and same-sex marriage - MPs who voted for or against the Bill.
- Bill C-250 - a 2003 bill criminalizing hate propaganda based on sexual orientation
- Civil marriage
