= Washington National Cathedral =

Episcopal Cathedral in Washington, D.C.

- Cathedral Church of St. Peter and St. Paul in the City and the Episcopal Diocese of Washington
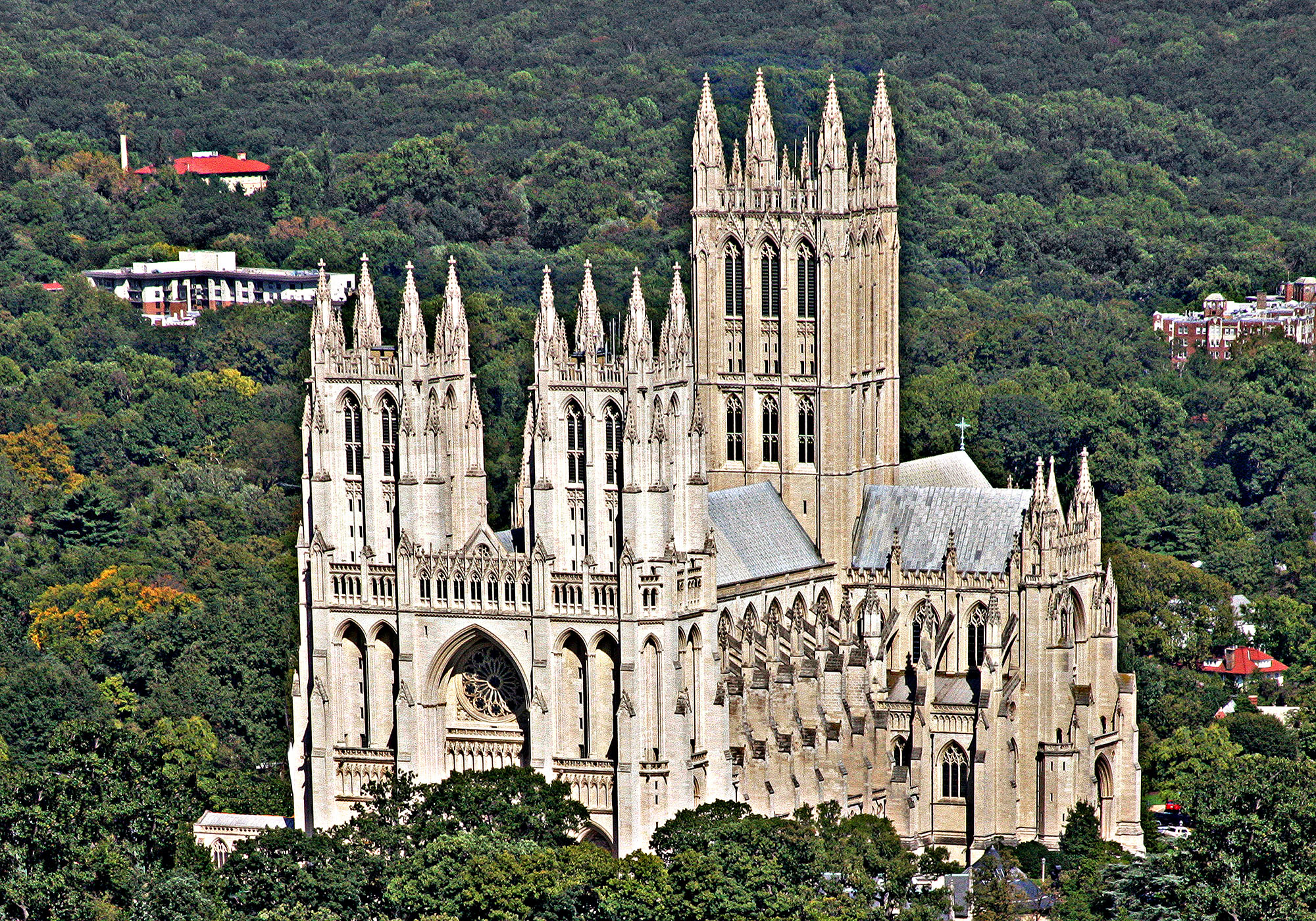
- Aerial view of Washington National Cathedral

- Location within Washington, D.C. Location within the United States
- 38°55′50″N 77°4′15″W
- Location: Massachusetts Avenue, Northwest, Washington, D.C.
- Address: 3101 Wisconsin Ave NW, Washington, DC 20016
- Country: United States
- Denomination: Episcopal Church
- Website: cathedral.org

Architecture
- Architect(s): George Frederick Bodley and Henry Vaughan, then Philip Hubert Frohman
- Style: Neo-Gothic
- Groundbreaking: September 29, 1907; 119 years ago
- Completed: September 29, 1990; 36 years ago

Specifications
- Capacity: ~4,000
- Length: 518 ft (158 m)
- Width: 158 ft (48 m)
- Height: 150 ft (46 m)

Administration
- Province: Province of Washington
- Diocese: Diocese of Washington
- Deanery: North District of Columbia

Clergy
- Bishop: Mariann E. Budde
- Dean: Randolph M. Hollerith
- Priest(s): Spencer Brown; Patrick Keyser

U.S. National Register of Historic Places
- Designated: May 3, 1974
- Reference no.: 74002170

D.C. Inventory of Historic Sites
- Designated: March 7, 1968
- Reference no.: 649

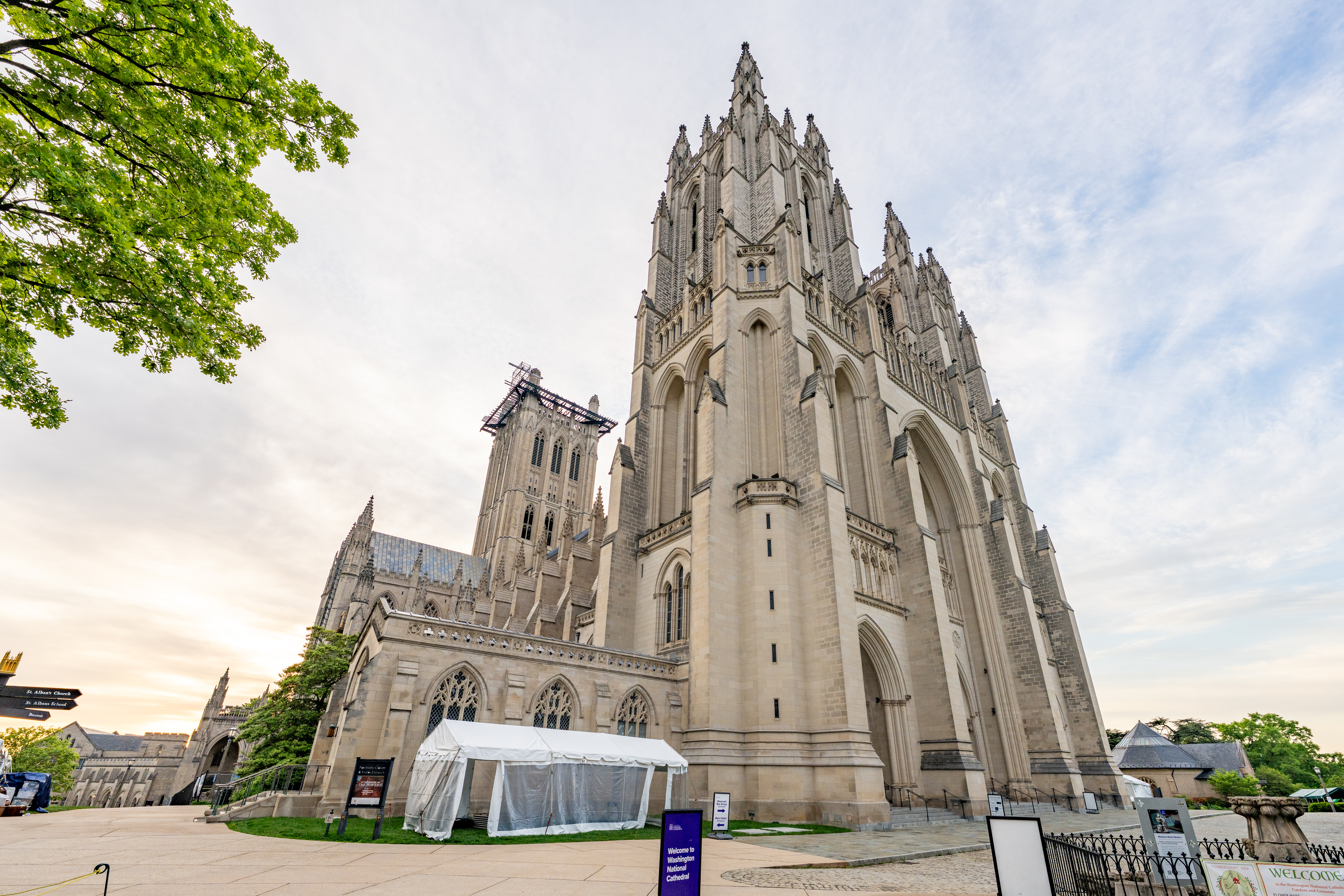
Exterior view

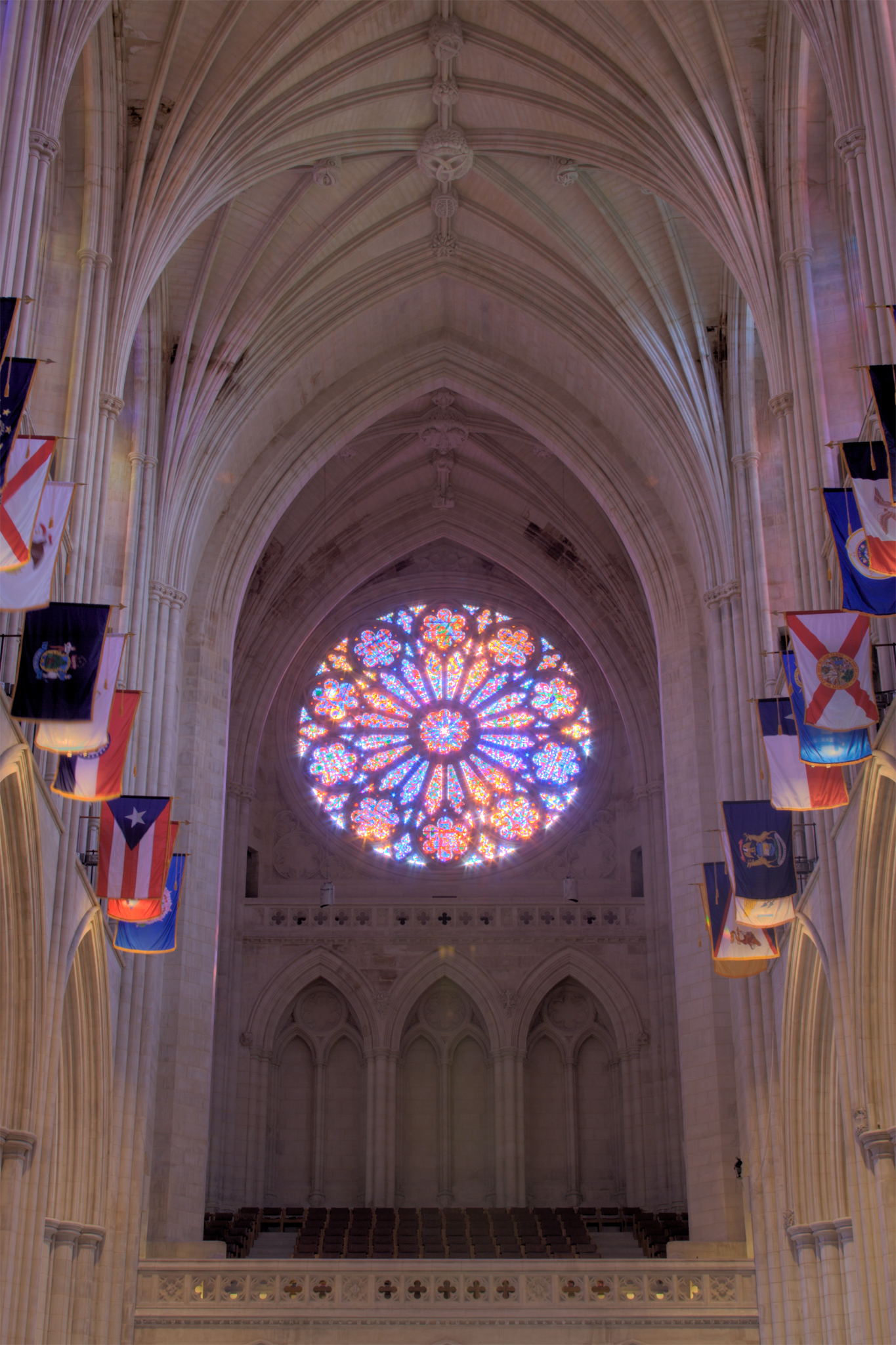
The west rose window was dedicated in 1977 in the presence of both the 39th President, Jimmy Carter, and Queen Elizabeth II (as Supreme Governor of the Church of England).

The Cathedral Church of Saint Peter and Saint Paul in the City and Episcopal Diocese of Washington, commonly known as Washington National Cathedral or National Cathedral, is a cathedral of the Episcopal Church. It is located in Washington, D.C., the capital of the United States. It was begun in 1907 and formally completed in 1990. It is of Neo-Gothic design closely modeled on English Gothic style of the late fourteenth century and is the second-largest church building in the United States, and the third-tallest building in Washington, D.C. The cathedral is the seat of both the presiding bishop of the Episcopal Church and the bishop of the Episcopal Diocese of Washington. Over 270,000 people visit the structure annually.

The Protestant Episcopal Cathedral Foundation, under the first seven bishops of Washington, erected the cathedral under a charter passed by the United States Congress on January 6, 1893. The foundation stone was laid on September 29, 1907 in the presence of President Theodore Roosevelt and a crowd of more than 20,000. The cathedral was completed 83 years later, after several phases of construction and yearslong interruptions, in the presence of President George H. W. Bush on September 29, 1990. Decorative and restorative work, particularly of damage from a nearby earthquake in 2011, is ongoing as of 2024. The Foundation is the legal entity of which all institutions on the Cathedral Close are a part; its corporate staff provides services for the institutions to help enable their missions, conducts work of the Foundation itself that is not done by the other entities, and serves as staff for the board of trustees.

The cathedral stands at Massachusetts and Wisconsin Avenues in the northwest quadrant of Washington. It is an associate member of the inter-denominational Washington Theological Consortium. It is listed on the National Register of Historic Places. In 2007, it was ranked third on the List of America's Favorite Architecture by the American Institute of Architects.

== History ==
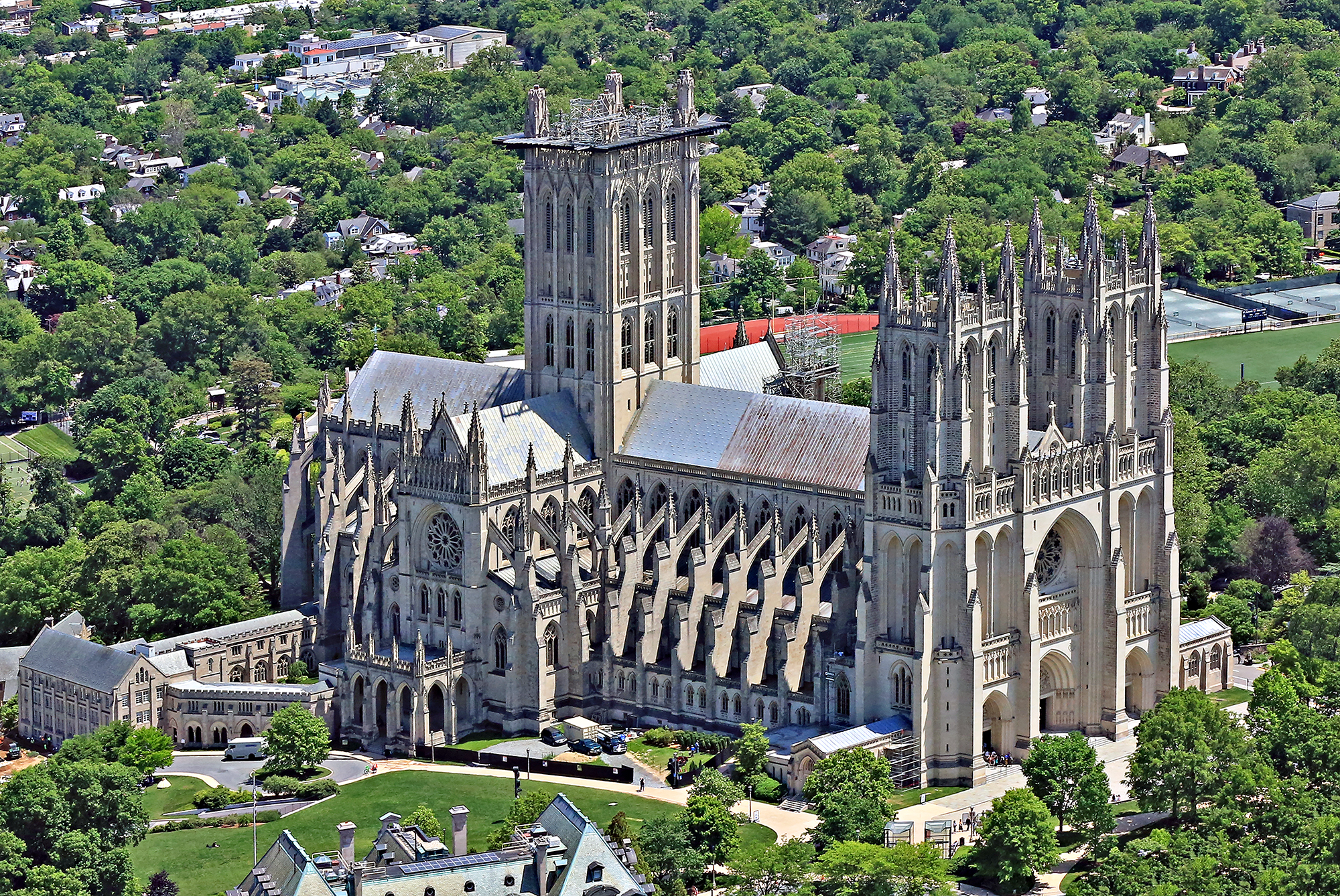
Washington National Cathedral Looking SE showing substantial use of flying buttresses.

In 1792, Pierre L'Enfant's "Plan of the Federal City" specified a site for a "great church for national purposes." However, he defined it as non-sectarian and nondenominational. Alexander Hamilton modified L'Enfant's plan and eliminated the "church" and several other proposed monuments; that plan was never reproduced. The working plan for the new city was subsequently produced by Andrew Ellicott and varied in many respects from L'Enfant's, although the essence remained. The National Portrait Gallery now occupies the site L'Enfant had envisioned for the church.

In 1891, a meeting was held to begin plans for an Episcopal cathedral in Washington. On January 6, 1893, the Protestant Episcopal Cathedral Foundation of the District of Columbia was granted a charter from Congress to establish the cathedral. The 52nd United States Congress declared in the act to incorporate the Protestant Episcopal Cathedral Foundation of the District of Columbia that the "said corporation is hereby empowered to establish and maintain within the District of Columbia a cathedral and institutions of learning for the promotion of religion and education and charity."

=== Architects ===
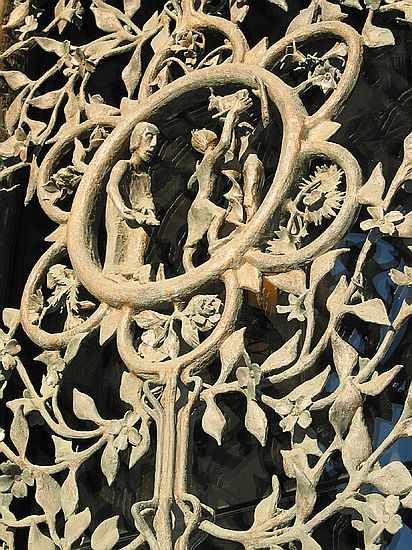
Detail of cast bronze gate

Henry Yates Satterlee, first Episcopal bishop of the Episcopal Diocese of Washington, chose George Frederick Bodley (founder of Watts & Co.), a highly regarded British Gothic Revival architect of the late-19th and early-20th centuries, and was influenced by Canterbury, as the head architect and subsequent designer of the cathedral master plan. Henry Vaughan was selected as supervising architect. Landscape architect Frederick Law Olmsted Jr. contributed a landscaping plan for the cathedral close, and Nellie B. Allen designed a knot garden for the Bishop's Garden. After Bodley died in 1907, his partner Henry Vaughan revised the original design, but work stopped during World War I, and Vaughan who was at an advanced age and in ill health died in 1917.

When work resumed after the war, the chapter hired Boston architecture firm Frohman, Robb and Little to execute the building. Philip Hubert Frohman, who had designed his first fully functional home at age 14 and received his architectural degree at age 16, and his partners worked to perfect Bodley's vision, adding the carillon section of the central tower, enlarging the west façade, and making numerous smaller changes. Ralph Adams Cram was hired to supervise Frohman because of his experience with the Cathedral of St. John the Divine in New York City, but Cram insisted on so many major changes to the original design that Frohman convinced the cathedral chapter to fire him. By Frohman's death in 1972, the final plans had been completed, and the building was finished accordingly.

=== Construction timeline ===
==== Site selection ====
An archival photograph of the Peace Cross, taken in 1912 on the site, standing in front of The Little Sanctuary.

The Mount Saint Alban site was selected in 1896 by Bishop Satterlee. The site, a wooded hill, somewhat distant from the center of the city and rising approximately 400 feet (about 120 metres) above the Potomac River, was the highest point in Washington, occupying an imposing position overlooking the new Capital. Satterlee believed it to be a stunning place to build, but also importantly located Northwest of the city center, an area into which it was (correctly) expected the city to expand later. In his writings on the cathedral's purpose, Satterlee emphasized that it should stand above politics and commercialism, serving as a reminder of the moral and spiritual values that should inform those pursuits. The land had been in the family of Joseph Nourse, an important figure from the government of President Washington, for many years. It passed through several descendants, and eventually passed to his granddaughter who, passing away, allowed the site to come up for sale in 1893. Purchasing the site was far from simple, as the funds were not available, however through the Bishop's fundraising abilities and several important donations, funds were found for the purchase. One of the most important of these was that of Phoebe Hearst, who donated a considerable sum for the founding of a girl's school.

The Peace Cross in 2016

With the site chosen, Bishop Satterlee was tasked with raising funds and establishing the organizations that would guide the cathedral's construction. He founded committees along the East Coast of the United States, which later became the National Cathedral Association (now the Protestant Episcopal Cathedral Foundation). Satterlee personally envisioned a Gothic cathedral, though other members of the Cathedral Chapter held differing views. A vigorous debate ensued over whether the building should be Gothic, Renaissance, or some other style. Ultimately Satterlee's vision, which he backed with passionate argument, prevailed, and a Decorated Gothic design was chosen on May 21, 1906.

==== Early structures on the site ====
The Mount Saint Albans site was something of a tabula rasa at its purchase. It housed St. Alban's Church, which had been constructed in the 1850s at the bequest of one of Joseph Nourse's descendants (Phoebe Nourse). It had been the location at which a convocation of bishops had even suggested that a cathedral should be built on the site. A number of other structures (religious, educative and administrative) were erected on the site before the project of the Cathedral itself was formally begun. The first was the Celtic Peace Cross, erected in 1898 in a ceremony presided over by Bishop Satterlee and addressed by President William McKinley, acting as a memorial for the fallen of the Spanish-American War which had recently ended, but dedicated to commemorating peace with Spain. Services were held at the site commemorating that war over the following years. It bears the following inscription: "Et Verbum caro factum est, et habitavit in nobis. This cross is raised in the historic year A.D. 1898 to mark the founding of the Cathedral of SS. Peter & Paul. 'That it may please thee to give to all nations unity, peace & concord we beseech thee to hear us Good Lord.' Jesus Christ himself being the chief cornerstone." and on the rear "The Peace Cross."

An archival photograph of a memorial war service at the Peace Cross in 1913.

It was followed by Hearst Hall (now the National Cathedral School), a girls school (completed 1899-1900), and The Little Sanctuary (now St. Albans School) and completed in 1902, which served as the Pro-Cathedral. It would come to house a number of the critical which would eventually be installed in the sanctuary of the Cathedral itself such as the Jerusalem Altar, Cathedra.

Cathedral Landmark and Sundial

An Altar and Sundial (the Cathedral Landmark and Sundial), constructed of the same Indiana Limestone (from which the cathedral would later be made), was planned in 1903 and erected in 1905. It was finally constructed to indicate that the debts for the land has been paid off allowing, in the Bishop's mind, the cathedral to be consecrated. The final gift of money ($50,000 at the time), was donated by Catalina Mason Myers Julian-James, and the Cathedral Landmark and Sundial, bears a number of inscriptions to this effect and to the dedication of the monument on the Feast of the Ascension, 1906. Inscribed around the mensa of the altar is "Transit umbra, lux permanet." along with Malachi 1:11.

==== Foundation stone ====
The turning of the first sod occurred, in the pouring rain, at the Mount Saint Albans site. It was conducted on the Eve of the Feast of Saint Bartholomew (August 23) of 1907, in a ceremony presided over by clergy (the first Dean of the Cathedral, Canon Bratenahl, Canon De Vries, and the Rev. W. T. Snyder) and Henry Vaughan, the cathedral's initial architect (who was later interred in the Bethlehem Chapel, a structure of his own design). It had been Satterlee's intention to lay the foundation stone on Michaelmas (September 29) of 1907, both for its liturgical symbolism and to capitalize on the convenience of numerous prominent international clergy who were visiting the United States to attend the Episcopal Church's General Convention in nearby Richmond, Virginia.

Preparations for a foundation stone had begun months earlier, at least by May 17, 1907, and continued through early July. Various options were considered, but because the Bishop was extremely fond of symbolism, the foundation stone was no exception. It was decided that the stone should be composite, comprising a small stone hewn from the rocks of the fields around the Church of the Nativity in Bethlehem (in Ottoman Palestine, as it was then known), the town in which Jesus is said to have been born. This stone, weighing approximately 4–5 pounds (about 2 kilograms), was to be embedded (for its protection) in a far larger, American granite block which had been purchased by Henry Vaughan and Canon Bratenahl.

The Bethlehem stone is engraved with a quotation from John 1:14: "The Word was made flesh and dwelt among us." The larger American granite block bears the inscription: "The Foundation Stone of the Cathedral Church of St. Peter and St. Paul, Feast of St. Michael and All Angels, A.D. 1907" (minuscule substituted and punctuation added). Contrary to the more common practices of the time, no other foundation deposits were laid with or encased in the stone. This was because Bishop Satterlee held that foundation deposits "indicate a lack of faith in the permanency of the building. As long as Mount Saint Alban stands, Washington Cathedral is expected to stand, and when building once begins, the stone will never again be dislodged or exposed to view."

The cornerstone of Washington National Cathedral was laid on September 29, 1907, in a ceremony presided over by Bishop Satterlee, the first Bishop of Washington, and rooted in centuries-old Anglican and American Episcopal ceremonial. The ceremony featured greetings from President Theodore Roosevelt, salutations from the Bishop of London, Arthur Winnington-Ingram, and addresses from Associate Justice David J. Brewer and Reverend Philip Napier Waggett. The cornerstone was laid by Bishop Satterlee toward the end of the ceremonies on September 29, 1907.

Ceremonial trowel utilized at the 1907 foundation ceremony

==== Early construction and stone selection ====
After the laying of the foundation stone, there was a pause in construction. A lengthy search for the ideal construction stone, which had begun earlier in 1906, had not yet concluded. As the Cathedral Chapter had voted to build the structure in the Decorated Gothic style, the choice of stone was critical. This style requires stone with very specific properties: a fine texture, strength, low porosity, and chemical stability. The search ended with a decision to use Indiana oolitic limestone due to its adaptability for hand carving — critically important for a building with decorative stonework — and its other valuable properties. The stone is relatively elastic and soft after quarrying, hardening after prolonged exposure to air while maintaining flexibility that prevents cracking with temperature changes (which would damage other varieties of stone). This last quality was especially important in an area with an annual average temperature range between approximately −10 °C and 37 °C (14 °F and 99 °F).

Once the choice of stone had been made, construction resumed in 1910 and continued until 1912. Bethlehem Chapel was completed at this time and was dedicated and opened for services on May 1 of that year. After a three-year hiatus, building restarted in 1915. Work commenced on the apse, which was completed in 1919. Construction was suspended again due to a lack of funding following World War I.

==== Major construction phases ====
In 1922, the first major building phase began, during which the great choir, the north transept, and a third of the south transept were completed. Fundraising efforts during this period were challenged by the effects of the Great Depression, and upon completion of the north porch in 1942, construction was halted again due to worker and funding shortages brought by World War II. During the nine-year period from 1948 to 1957, the south transept and nave were partially completed before once again construction was halted due to lack of funding. This phase saw significant progress on the cathedral's interior, including completion of the War Memorial Chapel, which was dedicated in 1957.

The longest period of uninterrupted construction lasted seventeen years, from 1960 to 1977, during which the central tower, the south transept, the nave, and parts of the west front were built. The cathedral's 301 ft (92 m) Gloria in Excelsis central tower was completed and dedicated in 1964. The tower houses two full sets of bells: a 53-bell carillon (the Kibbey Carillon) and a 10-bell peal for change ringing making it unique in North America. The nave and the west rose window were also completed during this period and were dedicated in 1976.

The final building phase, 1980 to 1990, encompassed the completion of the towers of St. Peter and St. Paul and the west facade. The first stone for the west towers was set on April 5, 1983. The final stone which was a 1,008 lb (457 kg) finial of Indiana limestone—was set atop the south tower on September 29, 1990, exactly 83 years after the foundation stone was laid. With the completion of the west towers, the cathedral's long construction project came to an end.

==== Funding ====
Funding for Washington National Cathedral has come entirely from private sources. The cathedral was chartered by Congress in 1893, but Congress provided no money for its construction. Every block of Indiana limestone was paid for by private donation, sometimes coin by coin, and there were periods when work stopped because the next gift had not yet been received. The cathedral receives no direct operating dollars from the federal government and is not subsidized through the budget of its diocese, the Episcopal Church, or any other denomination. Maintenance and upkeep continue to rely entirely upon private support.

Construction of Washington National Cathedral

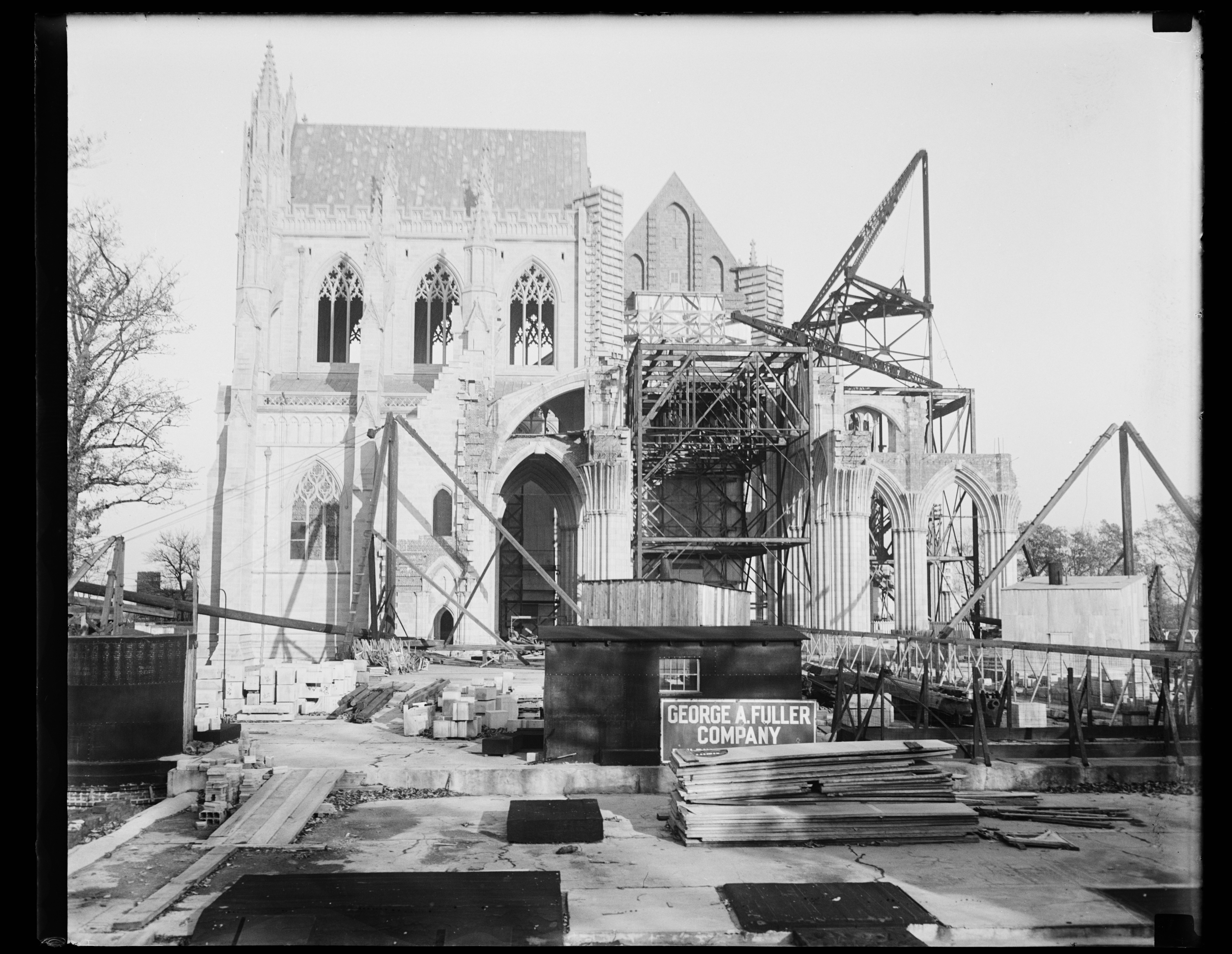

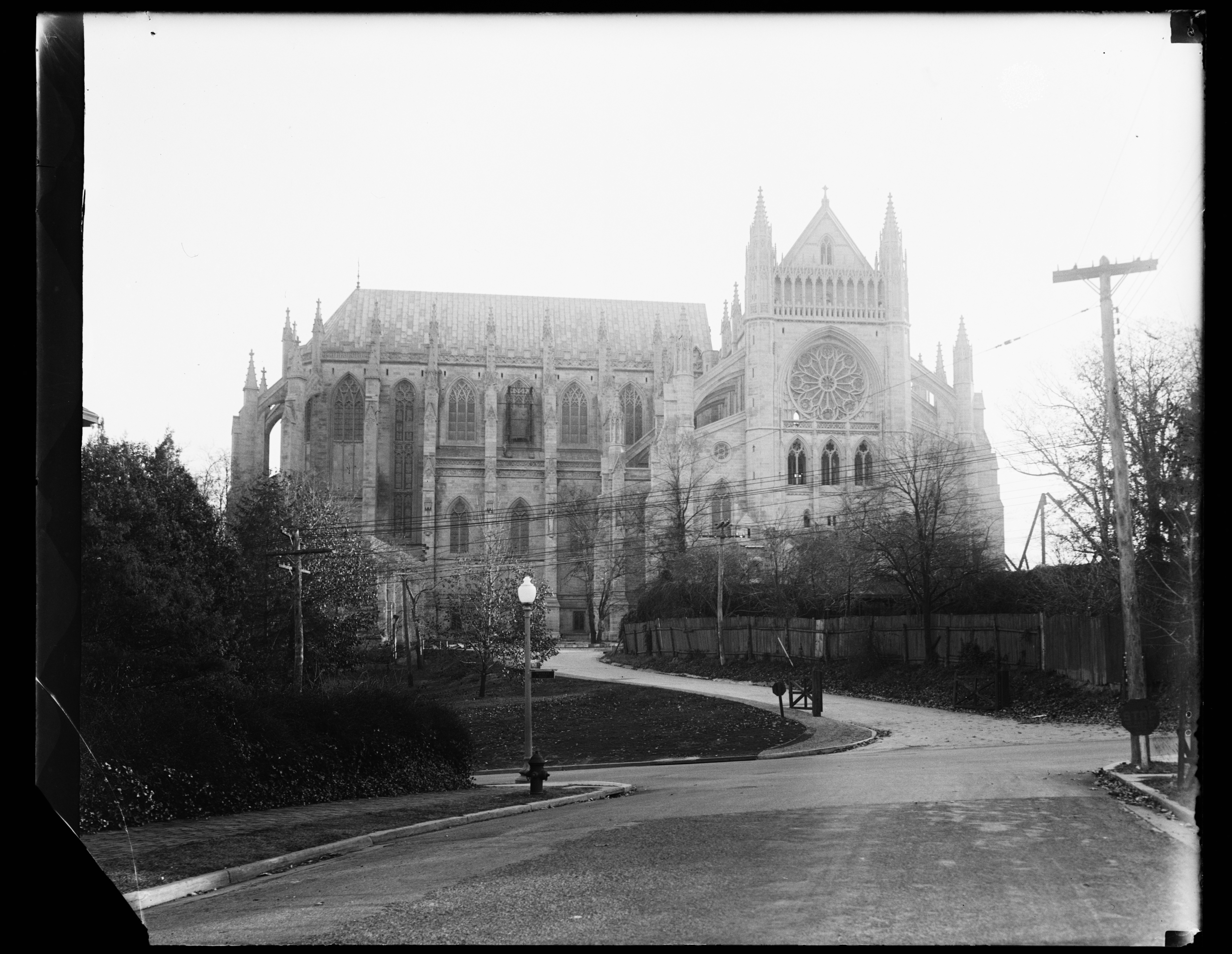

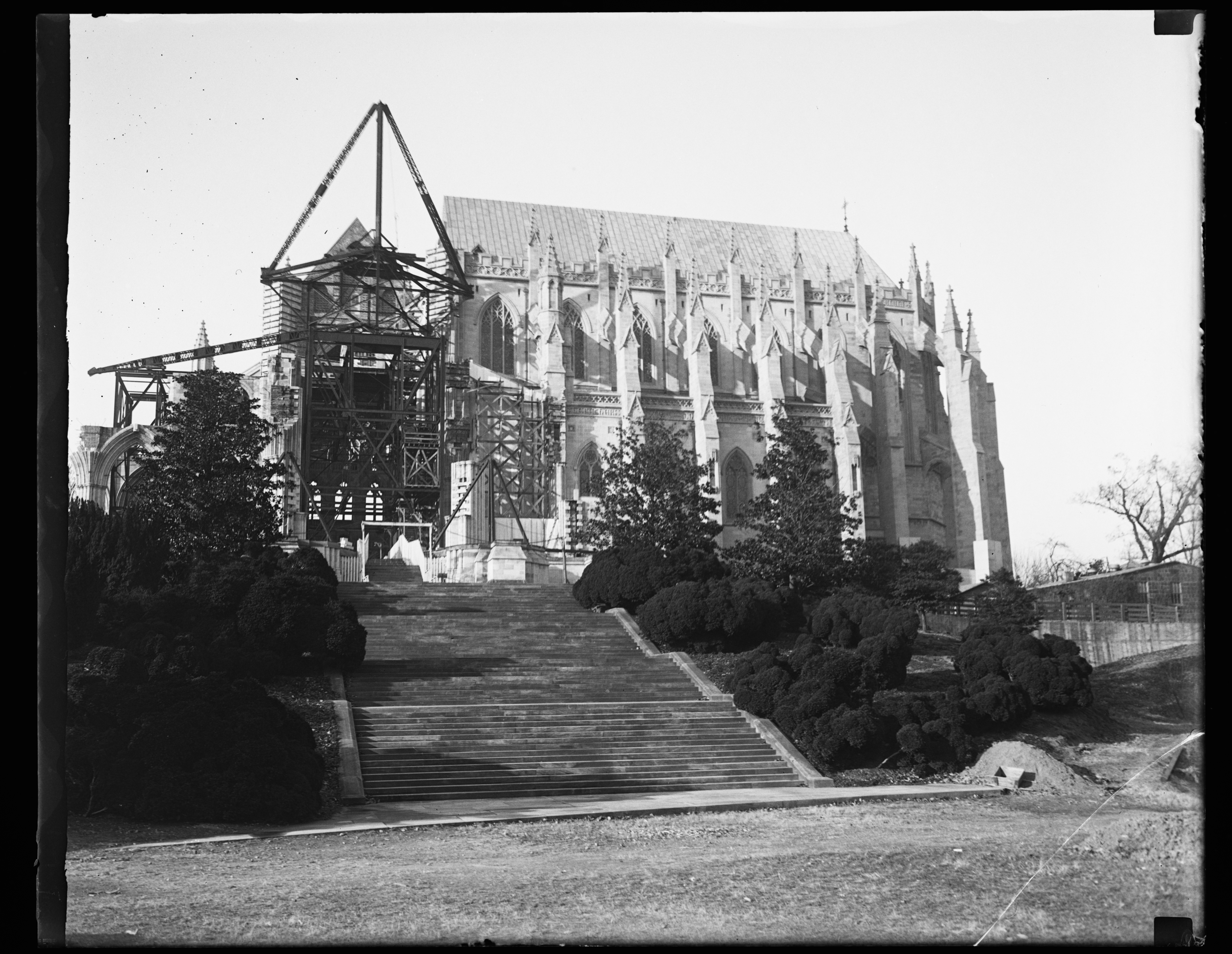

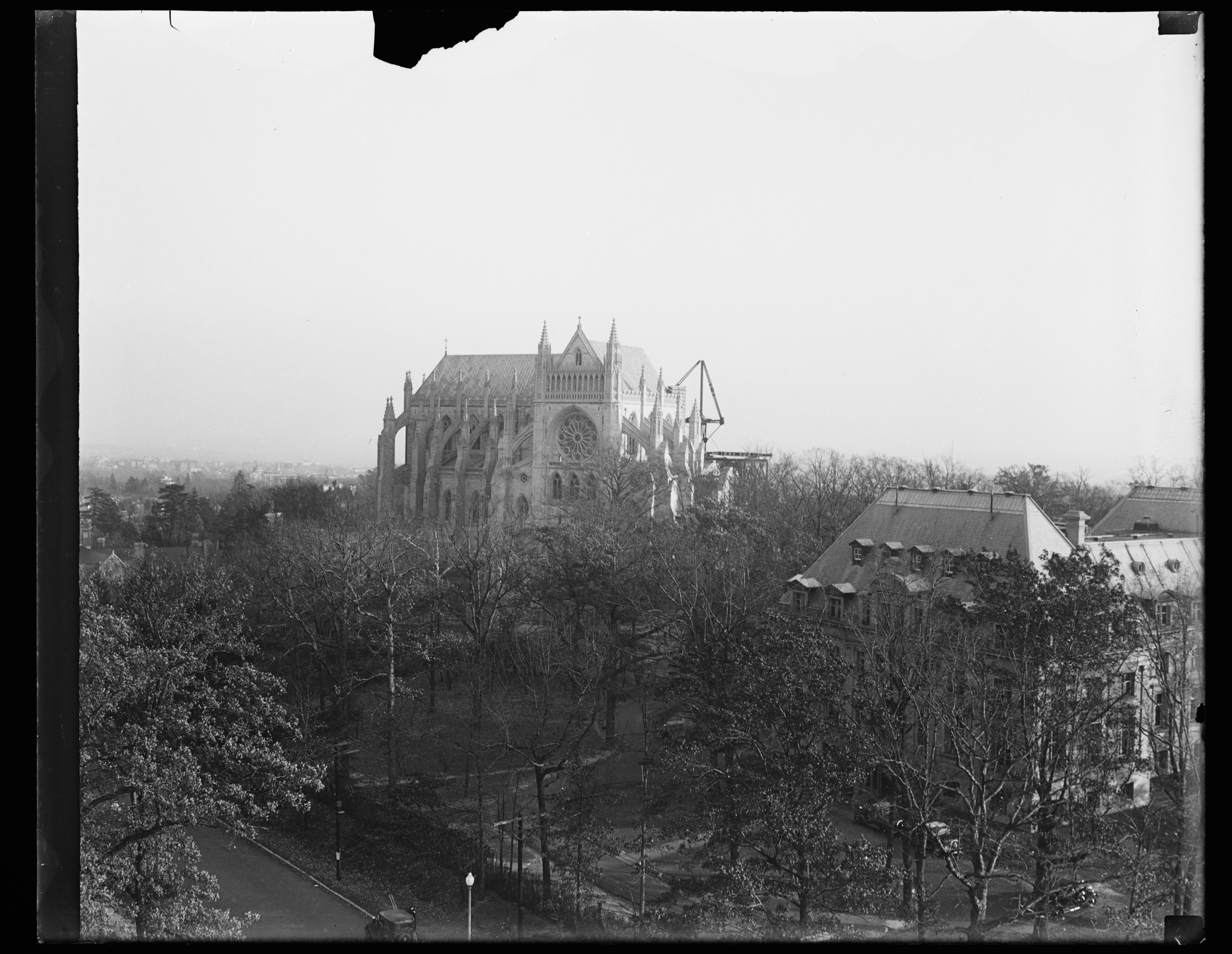

=== National role ===
From its earliest days, the cathedral has been promoted as more than simply an Episcopal cathedral. Planners hoped it would play a role similar to Westminster Abbey. They wanted it to be a national shrine and a venue for great services. For much of the cathedral's history, this was captured in the phrase "a house of prayer for all people." In more recent times the phrases "national house of prayer" and "spiritual home for the nation" have been used. The cathedral has achieved this status simply by offering itself and being accepted by religious and political leaders as playing this role.

Its initial charter was similar to those granted to American University, The Catholic University of America, and other not-for-profit entities founded in the District of Columbia c. 1900. Contrary to popular misconception, the government has not designated it as a national house of prayer.

During World War II, monthly services were held there "on behalf of a united people in a time of emergency." Before and since, the structure has hosted other major events, both religious and secular, that have drawn the attention of the American people, as well as tourists from around the world.

== Major events ==
=== 2011 earthquake ===
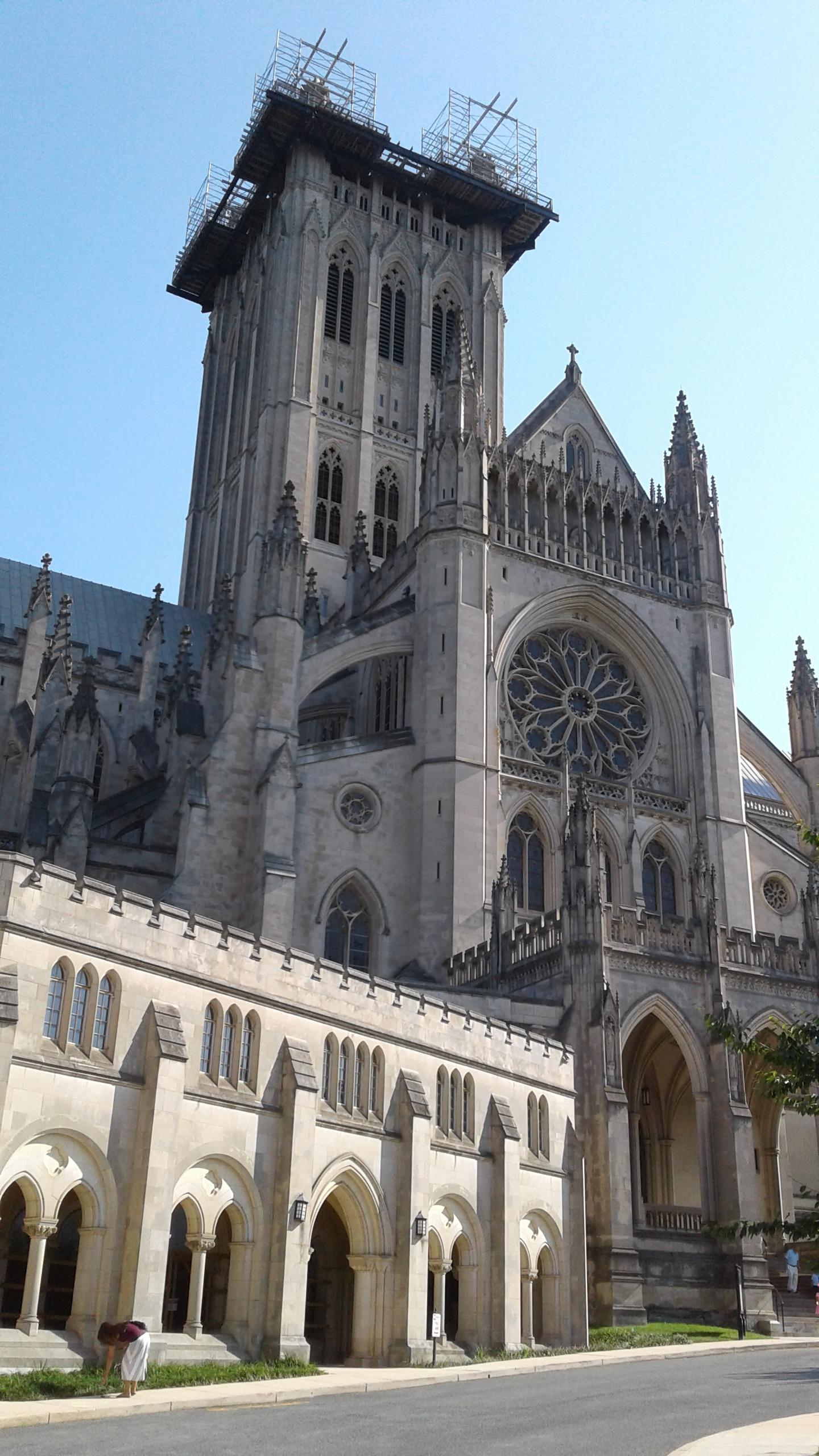
Washington National Cathedral undergoing repairs in 2017.

The cathedral was damaged in August 2011 during the Virginia earthquake. Finial stones on several pinnacles broke off, and several pinnacles twisted out of alignment or collapsed entirely. Some gargoyles and other carvings were damaged, and a hole was punched through the metal-clad roof by falling masonry. Cracks also appeared in the flying buttresses surrounding the apse. Inside, initial inspections revealed less damage, with some mortar joints loose or falling out. The cathedral, which had no earthquake insurance, struggled to cope with the cost of the damage.

Washington National Cathedral closed from August 24 to November 7, 2011, as $2 million was spent to stabilize the structure and remove damaged or loose stone. Safety netting was erected throughout the nave to protect visitors from any debris that might fall from above. The cathedral reopened for the consecration and installation of Mariann Budde as the ninth Bishop of Washington on November 12, 2011. At that time, estimates of the cost of the damage were about $25 million.

Identifying the full extent of the damage and construction planning and studies over the next two years consumed another $2.5 million. In 2011, the cathedral received a $700,000 preservation work matching grant from the Save America's Treasures program, a public-private partnership operated by the nonprofit National Trust for Historic Preservation. The program, which is federally funded, required the cathedral to match the grant dollar-for-dollar with private funds and use the money solely for preservation work.

Although fundraising to repair the damage began soon after the earthquake, it took the cathedral three years to raise the $15 million to complete the first phase of repairs. In August 2013, the cost of the repairs was re-estimated at $26 million. About $10 million had already been raised by this date to pay for the repairs, half of that coming from the Lilly Endowment. The cathedral began charging a $10 admission fee for tourists in January 2014, and started renting out its worship and other spaces to outside groups to raise cash. The cathedral also transformed the Herb Cottage (its old baptistry building adjacent to the cathedral) into a for-profit coffeehouse operated by the Open City café chain.

Phase I of the restoration, which cost $10 million, repaired the internal ceiling's stone and mortar and was completed in February 2015. The planned 10-year, $22 million Phase II will repair or replace the damaged stones atop the cathedral.

In June 2015, Washington National Cathedral leaders said the church needed $200 million, which would both complete repairs and expand its endowment to give the cathedral financial stability. The cathedral began working on a capital fundraising campaign, which The New York Times said was one of the largest ever by an American religious institution, to begin in 2018 or 2019. Hall said that the cathedral also planned to reopen the former College of Preachers and its Center for Prayer and Pilgrimage (a space on the cathedral's crypt level dedicated to prayer, meditation, and devotional practice). After three years of deficit spending, however, the cathedral also announced additional cuts to music programs to balance its budget.

In September 2022, the Cathedral publicly launched a $150 million comprehensive campaign, A Cathedral for the Future, which targets raising all necessary funds to complete the remaining earthquake repairs, estimated at $24 million. Once full funding is acquired, project managers estimate it will take several years to complete, given the complexity of the work and the great heights and weather conditions. The Cathedral hopes to complete all earthquake repairs by 2030. The Cathedral for the Future campaign concluded in early 2025, raising $185 million. The funding supports future ministries ($97 million), earthquake damage, the organ restoration project, allowed for the appointment of a Pastor for Digital Ministry, and endowed the office of the Canon Missioner and Canon Vicar.

=== Lee-Jackson stained glass windows ===
Stained glasses of Confederate generals (removed in 2017)

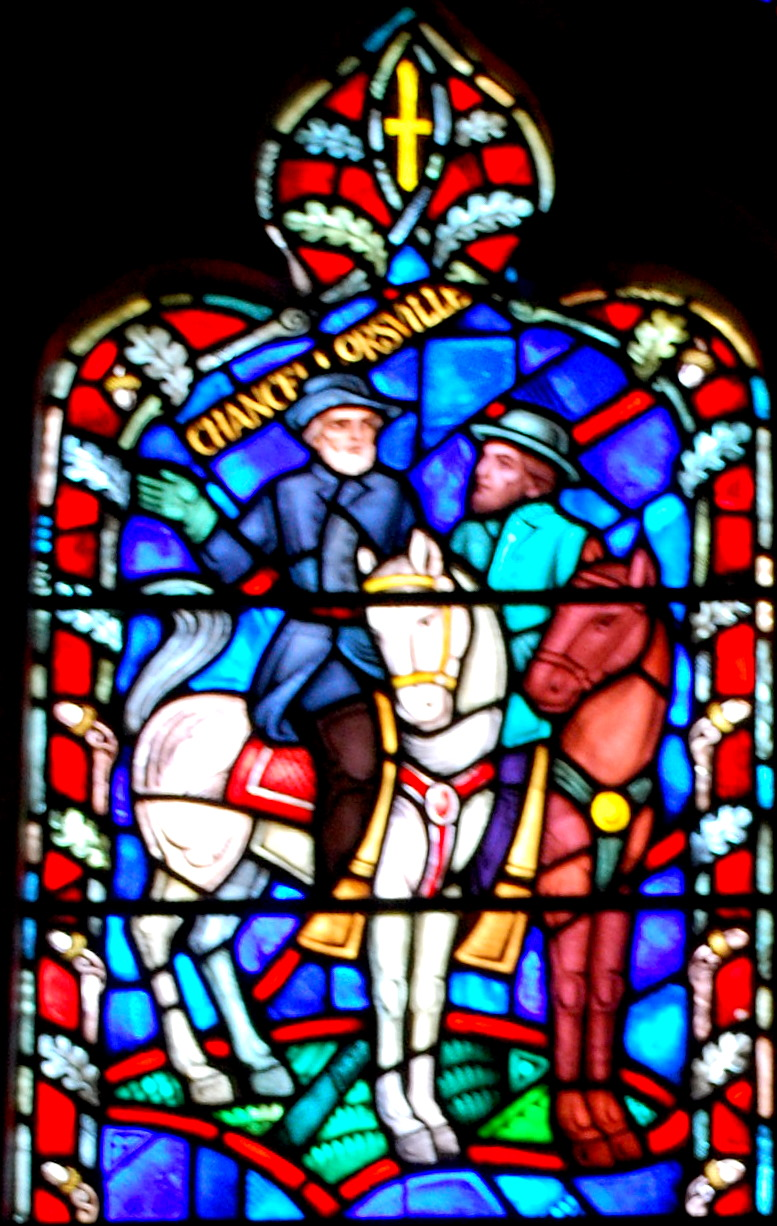
Lee at the Battle of Chancellorsville

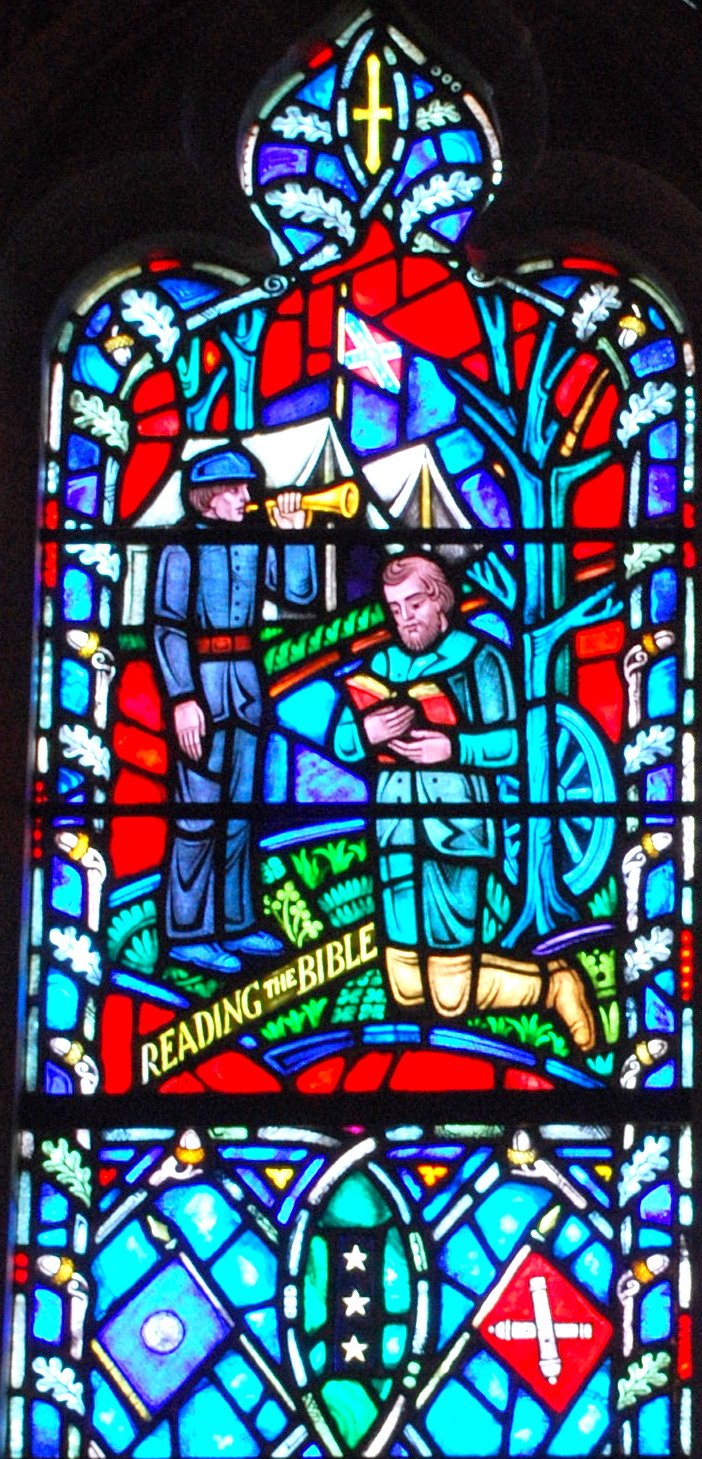
Jackson reading the Bible in a Confederate camp

In June 2016, after an examination by a five-person task force, it was announced that two Confederate battle flag images would be removed from stained glass windows commemorating the lives of Confederate generals Robert E. Lee and Stonewall Jackson. The windows were installed in 1953 after lobbying by the United Daughters of the Confederacy. In its report, the task force wrote that it "is unanimous in its decision that the windows provide a catalyst for honest discussions about race and the legacy of slavery and for addressing the uncomfortable and too often avoided issues of race in America. Moreover, the windows serve as a profound witness to the cathedral's own complex history in relationship to race."

The Now and Forever windows which replaced the Confederate windows.

On September 6, 2017, the cathedral, in a statement signed by the Right Rev. Mariann Edgar Budde, bishop of the Episcopal Diocese of Washington, the Very Rev. Randolph Marshall Hollerith, dean of the cathedral, and John Donoghue, chair of the cathedral chapter, announced its decision to deconsecrate and remove the stained glass windows honoring Lee and Jackson. The Robert E. Lee window was subsequently loaned to the Smithsonian Institution's National Museum of African American History and Culture for an exhibit on the legacy of Reconstruction.

On September 23, 2023, the "Now and Forever" Windows were unveiled and dedicated at the cathedral. The dedication service featured remarks from visual artist and window designer Kerry James Marshall, and a special reading of 'American Song' by poet Elizabeth Alexander.

== Financial challenges and recent success ==
In January 2003, Nathan D. Baxter, dean of the cathedral, announced his retirement effective from June 30, 2003. Baxter had led the cathedral since 1991. After an 18-month search, Samuel T. Lloyd III was named dean and began his tenure on April 23, 2005. Using a $15 million bequest the cathedral received in 2000, Lloyd rapidly expanded the cathedral's programming. Meanwhile, the cathedral deferred maintenance and decided not to make needed repairs. Construction also began in summer 2005 on a $34 million, four-level, 430-car underground parking garage. It opened in 2007. The structure was pushed by John Bryson Chane, bishop of the Episcopal Diocese of Washington, and was mostly funded by debt. Payments on the garage were $500,000 per year, with a major increase in the annual debt service beginning in 2017. In early 2008, the National Cathedral Association, the church's fundraising donor network, was disbanded after cathedral leaders concluded that the building was "finished" and it was no longer necessary to raise significant funds for construction.

The 2008–2009 Great Recession hit the cathedral hard. By June 2010, the cathedral cut its budget from $27 million to $13 million, outsourced the operation of its gift shop, shut its greenhouse, cancelled its plans to replace the Skinner organ in the sanctuary, and ceased operation of the College of Preachers that had provided Episcopal clergy nationwide with continuing theological education. The cathedral also laid off 100 of its 170 staff members, including its art conservator and its liturgist (who researched and advocated the use of liturgies at the cathedral). It also significantly cut back on programming, music performances, and classes. To help stabilize its finances, the cathedral began an $11 million fundraising campaign and used $2.5 million of its $50 million endowment to plug budget holes. The National Cathedral Association was recreated as well.

In June 2010, the cathedral announced that it was exploring the sale of its rare book collection, the value of which was estimated to be several million dollars. It sold a number of books to a private collector in 2011 for $857,000 and in 2013 donated most of the remaining collection to Virginia Theological Seminary.

As the economic downturn continued, a report by cathedral staff identified $30 million in needed maintenance and repairs. Among the problems were cracked and missing mortar in the oldest sections of the building; broken HVAC, mechanical, and plumbing systems throughout the structure; extensive preservation needs; and a main organ in disrepair. Repointing the building's masonry was estimated to cost at least $5 million, while organ repair was set at $15 million.

The Very Rev. Randolph Hollerith was named the 11th dean of the Cathedral on May 23, 2016 and began his tenure on August 1, 2016. He was installed in November, 2016. In 2019, he launched the cathedral's five-year Strategic Plan to focus on Welcoming, Deepening, Convening and Serving. In order to carry out the mission priorities of the five-year plan, the cathedral launched a $150 million A Cathedral for the Future comprehensive campaign; at its public launch in 2022, the campaign had already surpassed $115 million. The multifaceted campaign aims to secure total funding to complete earthquake repairs, fully renovate the 1938 Ernest M. Skinner & Son pipe organ, replace the audio system in the Cathedral nave, and sustain all operations over a five-year period. A centerpiece of the campaign is the new Virginia Mae Center (formerly known as the College of Preachers), which underwent a $24 million renovation to reopen as a fully accessible retreat house and conference center, and to serve as a hub of operations for the newly launched Cathedral College of Faith & Culture.

Hollerith also navigated the Cathedral through dramatic changes and a pivot to digital-first operations when the COVID-19 pandemic closed the cathedral's doors for nearly 18 months. From March 2020 through July 2021, all Cathedral services were online, with only minimal clergy and musicians inside the cathedral. The cathedral's first Easter service during COVID, in 2020, attracted more than 50,000 online viewers, and the cathedral now counts a virtual congregation that spans six continents, with 3,000-5,000 viewers joining online for Sunday worship services every week.

Since 2016, under Hollerith's leadership and financial stewardship, the cathedral has stabilized its finances, reporting consecutive annual operating surpluses in its audited financial statements, and moving forward with some large capital projects including the renovation and opening of the Virginia Mae Center, commencement of the great organ renovation, and continued earthquake repairs.

In the Spring of 2026, the Cathedral launched a new Strategic Plan for 2026-2030 based upon four pillars: Worship & Sacred Music, Sacred & Civic, Welcoming & World-Class Guest Experience, and Stewardship & Sustainability.

== Architecture ==
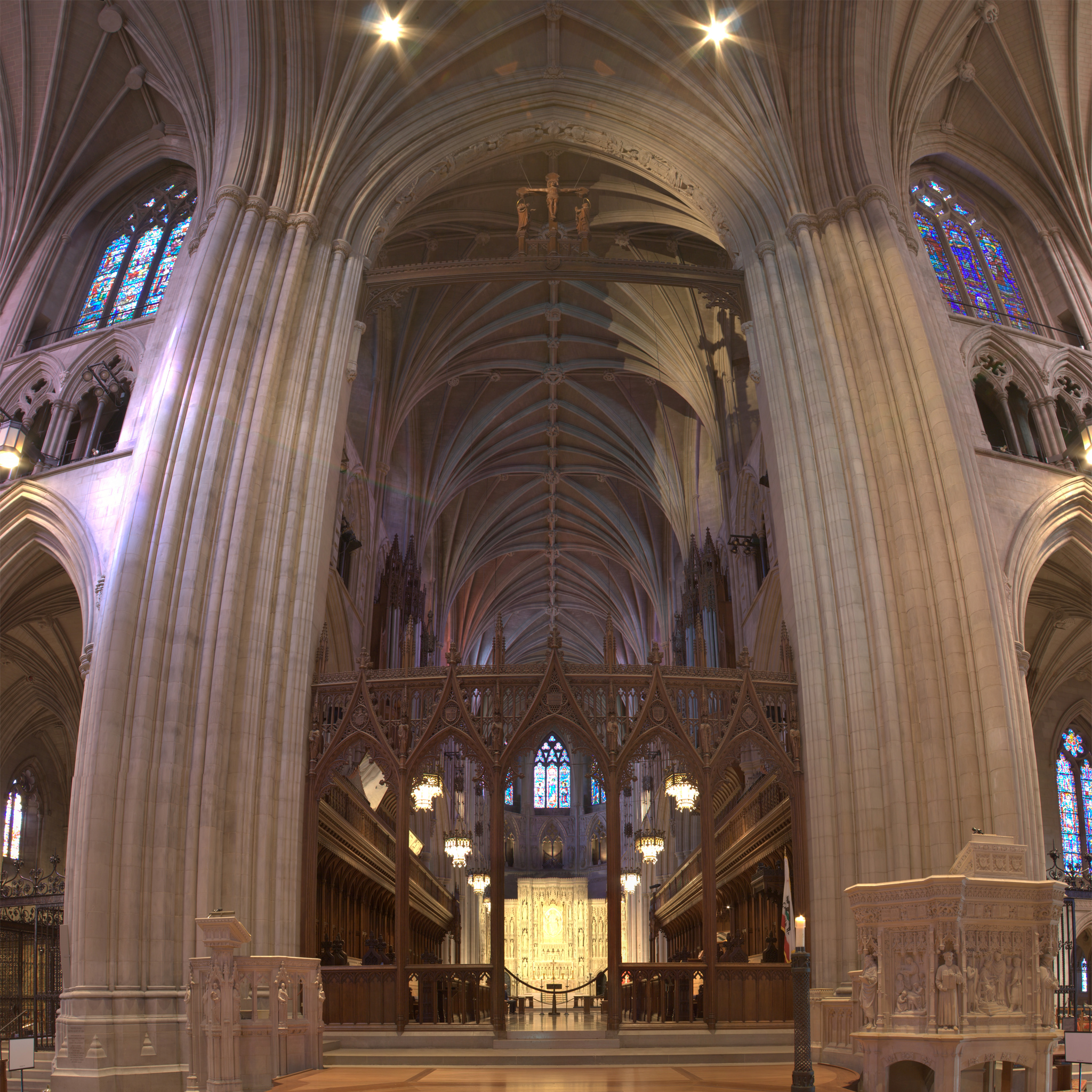
Looking east, looking up to the choir of the cathedral

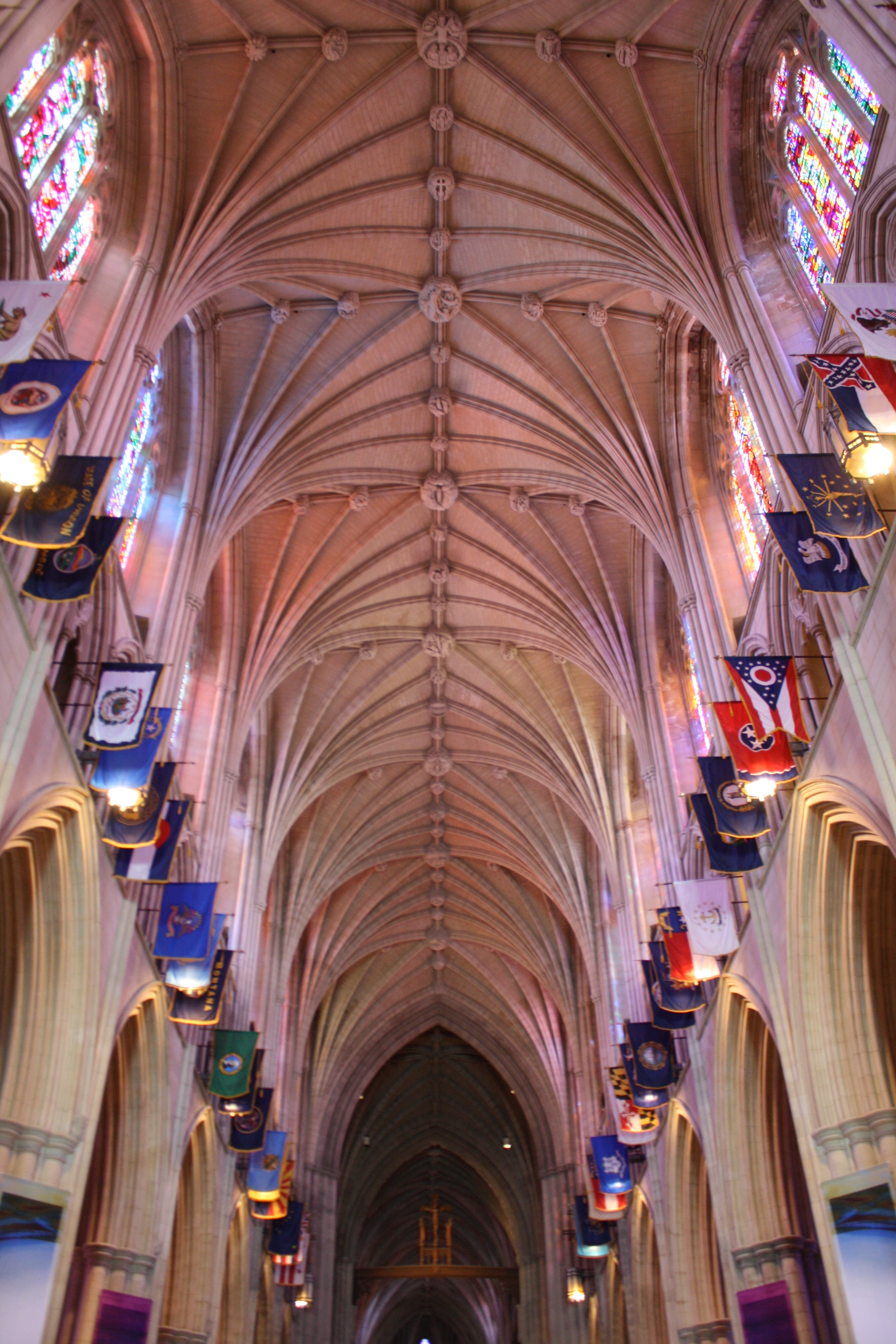
Nave vaulting facing east

=== Overall design and layout ===
The cathedral's final design shows a mix of influences from the various Gothic architectural styles of the Middle Ages, identifiable in its pointed arches, flying buttresses, a variety of ceiling vaulting, stained-glass windows and carved decorations in stone, and by its three similar towers, two on the west front and one surmounting the crossing.

The Pilgrim Observation Gallery.

The structure consists of a long, narrow rectangular mass formed by a nine-bay nave with wide side aisles and a five-bay chancel, intersected by a six-bay transept. Above the crossing, rising 301 ft (92 m) above the ground, is the Gloria in Excelsis Tower; its top, at 676 ft (206 m) above sea level, is the highest point in Washington. The Pilgrim Observation Gallery—which occupies a space about 3/4ths of the way up in the west-end towers—provides sweeping views of the city. Unique in North America, the central tower has two full sets of bells—a 53-bell carillon and a 10-bell peal for change ringing; the change bells are rung by members of the Washington Ringing Society. The cathedral sits on a landscaped 57-acre (23 ha) plot on Mount Saint Alban. The one-story porch projecting from the south transept has a large portal with a carved tympanum. This portal is approached by the Pilgrim Steps, a long flight of steps 40 feet (12 m) wide.

Most of the building is constructed using a buff-colored Indiana limestone over a traditional masonry core. Structural, load-bearing steel is limited to the roof's trusses (traditionally built of timber); concrete is used significantly in the support structures for bells of the central tower, and the floors in the west towers.

=== Sacred Stones of the Cathedral ===
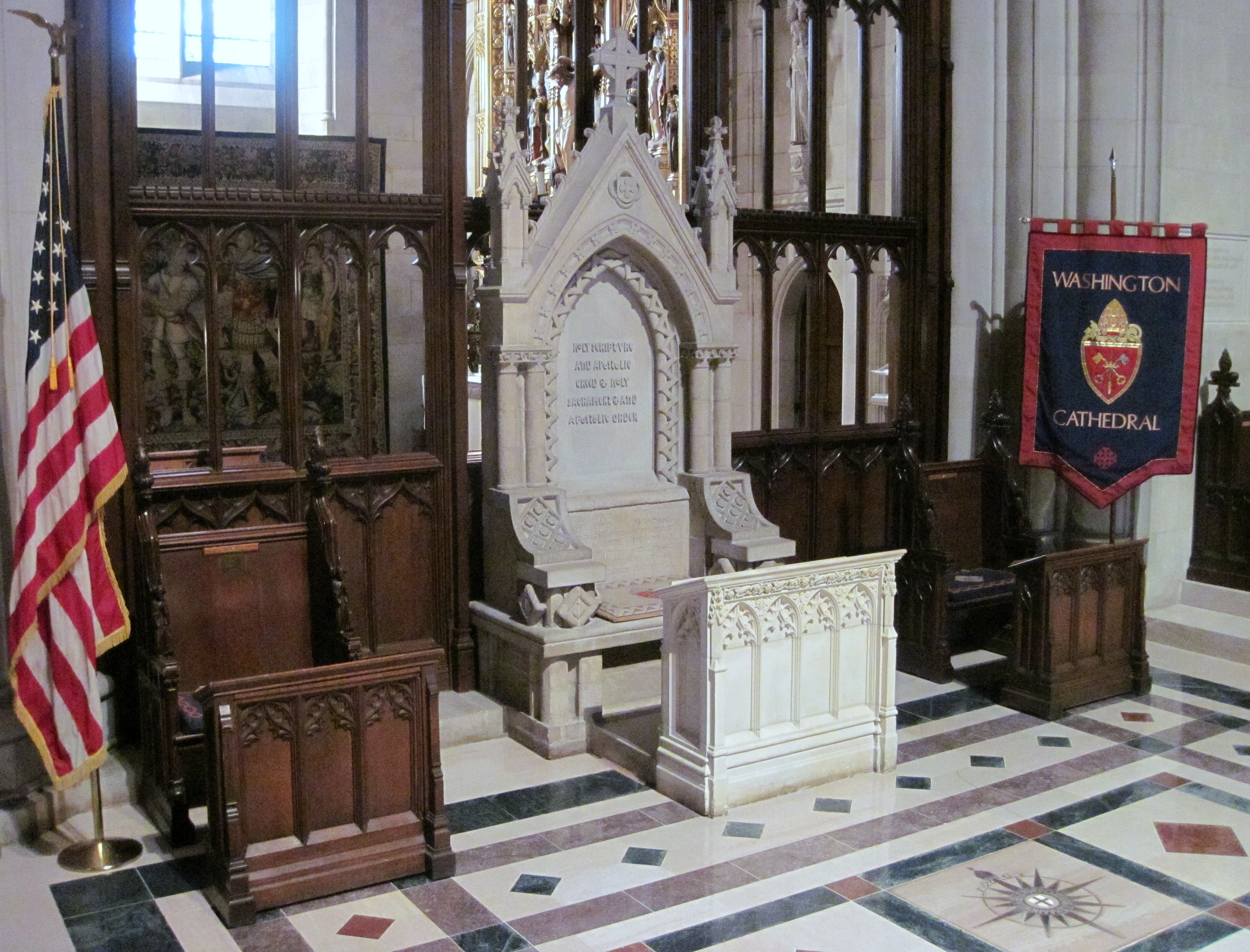
The cathedra of the National Cathedral, the Anglican Compass Rose installed in the floor before it.

Over the years, the Cathedral has obtained or been gifted many important items of stone (and stones themselves), from significant locations. Some of them were gifted to the Cathedral before it had even had its foundation stone, one which was quarried from the fields near the Church of Bethlehem, was laid.

==== The Glastonbury Cathedra ====
One of the first and most important parts of the Cathedral, specifically that which gives it its name (i.e. the cathedra), the Bishop's Seat, was obtained from the stones of Glastonbury Abbey. Bishop Satterlee, subsequent to his participation in the Fourth Lambeth Conference of 1897 and touring the ruins of the Abbey, wished to create a more physical symbolic link between the new Cathedral and the mother Church in England and particularly with the Abbey which had been the Abbey of Ss. Peter and Paul, a direct link to the Cathedral's intended name. He contacted Stanley Austin, the then owner of the site of the ruins, to request stones to be incorporated into the building. Austin, under advisement, provided twenty three which Satterlee incorporated into the cathedra itself, which was dedicated in 1901. This was housed in the Little Sanctuary (now the chapel of St. Alban's School) until the Cathedral itself could accommodate it. It is inscribed with the following words: "Holy Scripture / and Apostolic / Creed + Holy / Sacrament + and / Apostolic Order" (the original is in majuscule, minuscule added for reading clarity). In 1990 a compass rose was added to the floor before the cathedra by the Archbishop of Canterbury, to symbolize the Anglican Communion globally.

==== The Jerusalem Altar ====
The Jerusalem Altar and its reredos.

The second piece of critical infrastructure is The high altar, the Jerusalem Altar. This was made from stones quarried at Solomon's Quarry near Jerusalem, reputedly where it is said the stones for Solomon's Temple were quarried. It is comparably simple compared to may of the other chapel altars which have been erected in the Cathedral, engraved with words from the Gospels. Satterlee considered the altar to be the first stones of the cathedral. In the floor directly in front of it are set ten stones from the Chapel of Moses on Mount Sinai, the number representing the Decalogue. Practically they also serve as the place on which the celebrant of the Eucharist can recite The Ten Commandments or the Summary of the Law during the service.

==== The Canterbury Pulpit ====
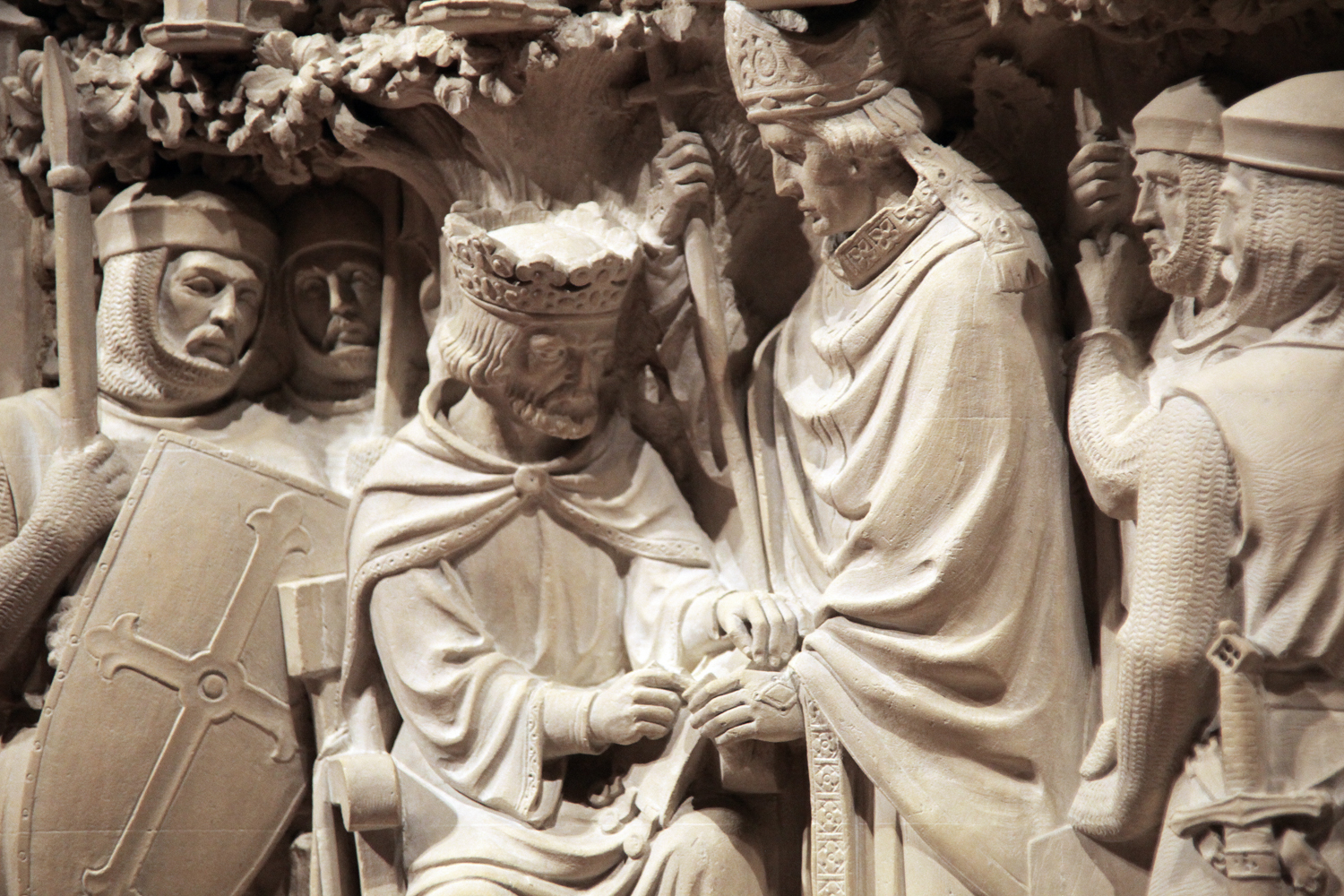
Detail from the Canterbury Pulpit's Magna Carta panel

The cathedral's "Canterbury Pulpit" was carved from stones of the Bell Harry Tower of Canterbury Cathedral, the spiritual center of Anglicanism. It was presented to the cathedral in 1907 by Randall Davidson, Archbishop of Canterbury, in memory of his predecessor Stephen Langton. It was one of the first furnishings gifted to the Cathedral. It rises ten feet and thirteen steps high. Made of Caen limestone believed to have originated with William the Conqueror, the pulpit was sculpted under the direction of W. D. Caröe. The central panel depicts King John's signing of Magna Carta (the first legal document confirming the rights of the English Church) in 1215 as Stephen Langton, archbishop of Canterbury, looks on. The side panels depict figures in the history of the English Church: Venerable Bede on his death-bed dictating a translation of St. John's Gospel into Anglo-Saxon, and William Tyndale who was martyred for translating and distributing a vernacular translation of the scriptures in English. Jon Meacham wrote in 2013 of the pulpit, "it is from here, from this rock, that preachers are given the peculiar opportunity to address not only those in the pews but those in power." It was from this pulpit that Martin Luther King Jr. delivered his final Sunday sermon on March 31, 1968, four days before his assassination.

The Canturbury Pulpit

==== The Jerusalem Cross Flooring ====
The Jerusalem Cross at the crossing of the Cathedral.

In contrast to the stone floors that dominate most of the cathedral, the crossing (at the intersection of the nave and transept) features an elevated, expandable wooden platform (also adorned with the Jerusalem Cross to replicate the pattern of the marble floor beneath.) Notably, this space serves as the stage for orchestra and choir concerts on United States Independence Day and a place for state funerals, where the coffins rest.

The Space Window with a stone taken from the surface of the Moon.

==== Other Notable Stones ====
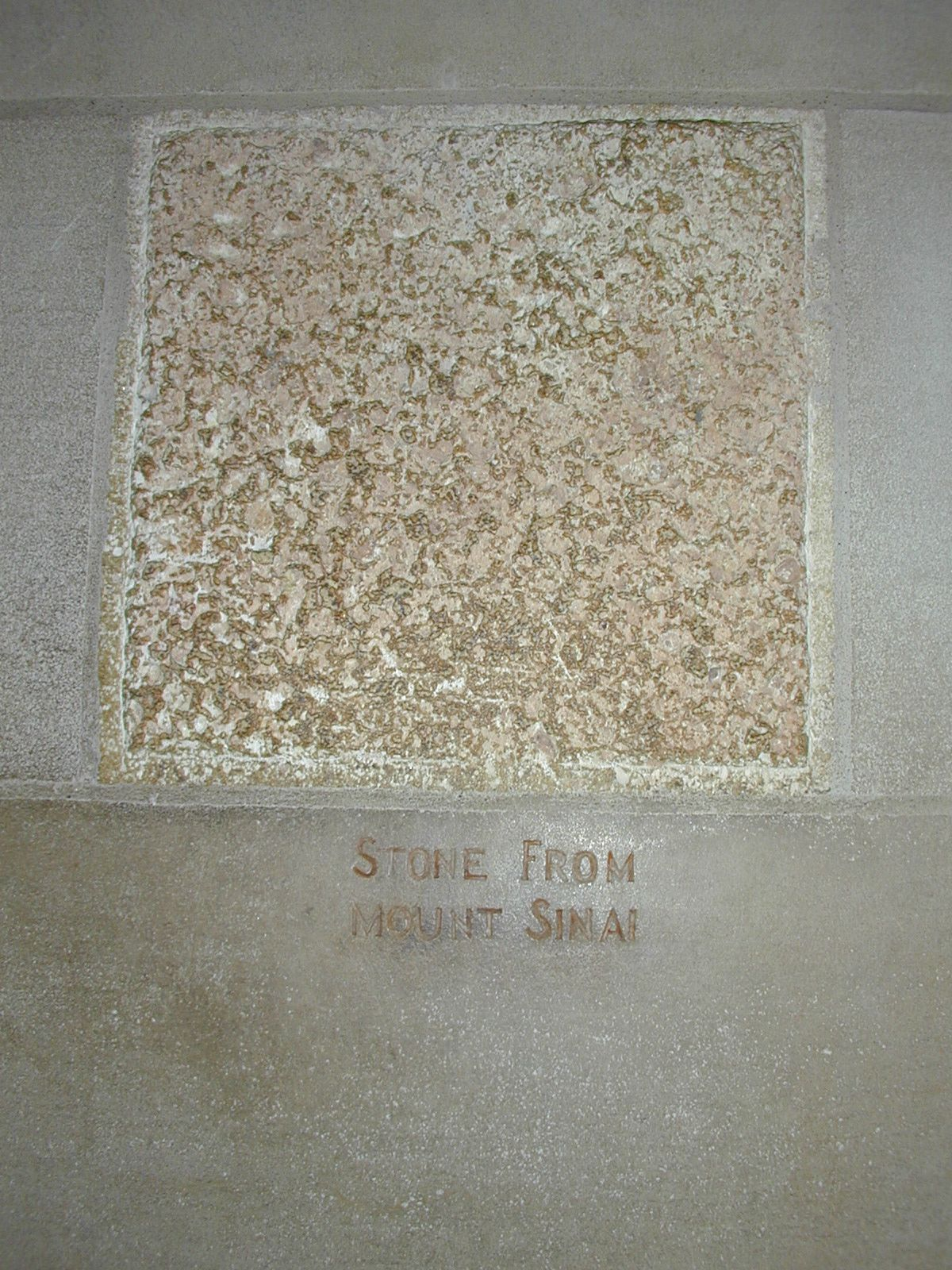
A stone from Mount Sinai

Over the time since the plans for and construction of the Cathedral began, many other stones have been donated and incorporated into the structure of the building. Including stones from:

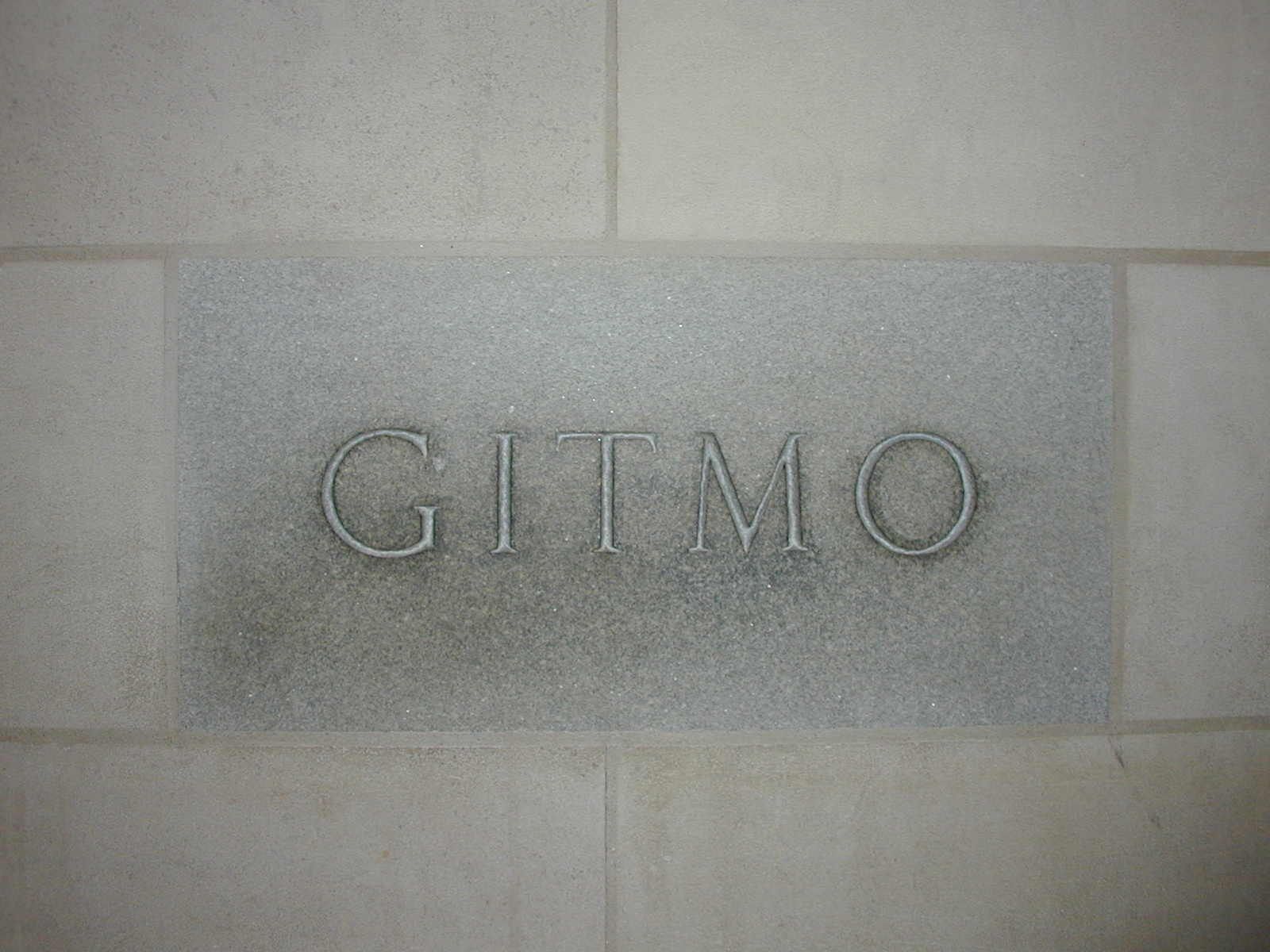
GITMO stone inscribed in 1964 as a gift to the cathedral from those at Guantanamo Bay Naval Base

- Guantanamo Bay
- The Sea of Tranquility on the Moon
- Mount Sinai
- the White House (donated during the 1950's renovations)
- The Appian Way
- The Western Wall (a.k.a. The Wailing Wall) in Jerusalem
- Westminster Abbey
- Canterbury Cathedral
- And several other important abbeys, cathedrals and significant locations

=== Stained glass and decorative arts ===
There are many other works of art including over two hundred stained glass windows, the most familiar of which may be the Space Window, honoring mankind's landing on the Moon, which includes a fragment of lunar rock at its center; the rock was presented at the dedication service on July 21, 1974, the fifth anniversary of the Apollo 11 mission.

A close-up of a panel of one of the wrought iron doors of the National Cathedral.

Extensive wrought iron adorns the building, much of it the work of Samuel Yellin. A substantial gate of forged iron and carbon steel by Albert Paley was installed on the north side of the crypt level in 2008. Intricate woodcarving, wall-sized murals and mosaics, and monumental cast bronze gates can also be found. Most of the interior decorative elements have Christian symbolism, in reference to the church's Episcopal roots, but the cathedral is filled with memorials to persons or events of national significance: statues of Washington and Lincoln, state seals and flags which are embedded in the marble floor of the narthex and hang along the nave respectively, stained glass commemorating events like the Lewis and Clark expedition and the raising of the American flag at Iwo Jima.

=== Intentional asymmetries and architectural refinements ===
The cathedral was built, by its architects, with several intentional "flaws" (mainly but not exclusively) in the form of deliberate asymmetries based on a particular understanding of gothic and medieval cathedral construction and the aesthetics thereof.

A view down the Apse of the cathedral, the asymmetry is visible particularly at the Rood-screen where the Choir begin.

At the time that the ultimate firm of architects' construction began, the cutting edge understanding was that "flaws," refinements as the literature described them, were introduced in ancient cathedrals to breathe life into them and give them a sense of vitality, in essence to humanize them, in a similar manner to the concept of Wabi-sabi in Japanese aesthetics, or the Navajo Ch'ihónít'i (Spirit pathway) practice in weaving. This idea was spawned at a time when the Industrial Revolution had rendered ever greater degrees in standardization and mechanization of construction, leading some to feel that that era's construction lacked the life-force which older, work-man based architecture possessed—a concept put forward by the architectural thinker John Ruskin.

A key researcher into this idea was William Henry Goodyear who wrote extensively on medieval and gothic cathedrals and their refinements, and their vitality and whose work would come to influence P.H. Frohman who would be one of the key designers of the cathedral.

The idea, however, that such "flaws" were intentionally introduced by those ancient architects has since been debunked as it would have gone against moral, religious, and ethical obligations to attain to perfection. Thus whilst it is interesting that this concept has been deliberately introduced into the Cathedral, the belief has been characterized by scholars as an example of a persistent historical misconception.

The architects did design these asymmetries in part to compensate for visual distortions. For example, the main aisle where it meets the crossing is tilted slightly off its axis to counteract the optical foreshortening that would otherwise occur when viewed from the center of the nave. Classical architects, such as those who designed the Parthenon, did indeed employ optical refinements to counteract visual illusions. While Goodyear argued that similar refinements existed in Gothic architecture, this view has been rejected by modern scholarship.

=== The crypt ===
The crypt complex is a subterranean area of the National Cathedral and contains a number of chapels, tombs and columbaria, the North and South aisles and other work and storage areas. It is the oldest part of the Cathedral where the foundation stone of the Cathedral was laid in 1907 by President Roosevelt. The architects, playing with the idea of it being older than the Gothic-revival structure above, designed these areas in a variety of architectural styles including Norman (c.1000–c.1150), Romanesque (c.1066-1154), and Transitional (c.1145-1190) styles, all of which predate the Early English/Gothic (1189-1307) style evoked by the main cathedral. This stylistic mixture was also intended to evoke the common European practice of building new cathedrals on the sites of earlier churches, or expanding older churches at different times, creating a mosaic of different styles rather than a unified whole. The crypt has four named chapels and a further defined space for prayer and reflection (in the order of their construction): the Bethlehem Chapel, the Chapel of the Resurrection, the Chapel of St. Joseph of Arimathea, the Chapel of the Good Shepherd, and the Cathedral Center for Prayer and Pilgrimage (which has passed through a number of different roles, at one point being a chapel dedicated to St. Dunstan).

==== The North and South Aisles ====
This portion of the crypt is a core area designed in a Romanesque style, as the aisles act as the principle walkways for the subterranean portion of the cathedral. A lot of parts of the aisles are off limits to the general public as they contain administrative, storage, and private burial areas. The aisles also feature some of the more prominent tombs. They also lead down to a further subterranean level which is off limits: the sub-crypt. This area handles other critical infrastructure related to the running of the cathedral (heating ducts, ventilation, electrical systems etc.). Not much is written This area can be further researched at the National Building Museum's Washington National Cathedral Collection.

==== The Chapel of St. Joseph of Arimathea ====
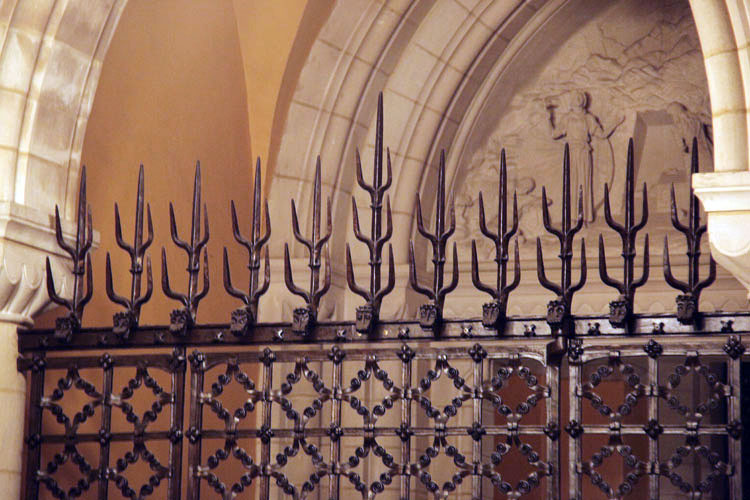
A sample of some of the famous wrought ironwork so prominent about the Cathedral, this portion is in the style of thistles, and found in the Chapel of St. Joseph of Arimathea.

This is the third chapel to be built in the construction of the crypt and is located directly under the intersection of the nave and the transept of the cathedral above. Iron gates, designed by Samuel Yellin, but wrought by Nol Putnam, lead to the columbarium where the remains of many individuals are interred. The most well known of these gates is the Folger Gate. The chapel itself also serves as the place of internment of a number of prominent individuals. The chapel itself is dedicated to the memory of Canon Walden Myer and his sister Gertrude interred beneath it.

The sanctuary of the Chapel of St. Joseph of Arimathea, featuring the mural "The Entombment of Christ" by Jan Henryk de Rosen

The chapel is built in the Norman Romanesque style. The chapel is named for St. Joseph of Arimathea who, according to the four gospels: was described as a rich man and disciple of Jesus in Matthew 27, a respected member of the Sanhedrin who was also himself looking for the kingdom of God (in Mark 15) and had not consented to their actions to seek capital punishment for Jesus (in Luke 23). After the Crucifixion, John 19 indicates that he took control of the body of Jesus and preparations for its burial in a sepulcher privately owned by St. Joseph.

Architecturally, the chapel plays on this idea, as it is recessed, by 12 steps (approximately 8 feet), further into the ground than the area around it intending to symbolize the descent of the body of Jesus into the Tomb. A unique feature of this chapel is the mural, the only one in the Cathedral, adorning the wall behind the chapel altar depicting the transfer of the body of Jesus on a bier to the tomb, entitled "The Entombment of Christ" painted by Jan Henryk de Rosen. De Rosen chose to model the characters in the mural on staff and choirboys of the cathedral when he painted it.

The altar and altar furnishings of this chapel are also noteworthy. It is reported that the candlesticks and altar cross were a gift of King George VI in thanks for the welcome the cathedral provided to British Subjects during the Second World War. The altar itself was a gift dedicated to the memory of George Chase Christian, a prominent miller of Minneapolis famous for improving the output of mills under his charge, by his wife.

==== The Chapel of the Good Shepherd ====
This is the fourth of the chapels constructed in the building of the crypt. It has served a number of functions during its history, having previously being used as a reception room for floral deliveries before being converted to a chapel. It is one of the portions of the Cathedral which may remain open to private prayer while the rest of the building is closed, as entry remains deliberately open (through the Garth Cloister) for a maximal amount of time to allow people access to a place to pray. It is a very small space, seating between five and seven, and is reportedly one of the quietest parts of the building.

The chapel is constructed in the Romanesque style similar to that of the Chapel of St. Joseph of Arimathea. The reredos features a bas-relief depicting Jesus, the Good Shepherd, carrying a lamb. This acting as a nod to the pastoral nature of the believer's relation to Jesus and the function of the chapel as a space for contemplation. This is situated behind a simple, rough-hewn, altar of the same Salisbury pink granite.

The chapel is secured by a wrought-iron gate illustrating the pastoral themes of the chapel, created by Albert Paley, featuring a stylized shepherds crook (or episcopal crozier), blades of grass and greenery, flowing water, and a 24-karat gold-plated nimbus or halo.

==== The Bethlehem Chapel ====
The altar of the Bethlehem Chapel

The Bethlehem Chapel is the first and oldest of the crypt chapels, and consequently the oldest completed portion of the Cathedral itself. It was the location at which the cathedral's foundation stone was laid on 29 September 1907, in a ceremony attended by President Theodore Roosevelt. The altar of the chapel sits directly above this foundation stone, and directly below the Jerusalem High Altar above. The chapel opened for religious services on 1 May 1912, and services have been conducted daily, almost continually, in this space ever since. The foundation stone is now buried several feet below the altar as a result of the subsequent construction above it.

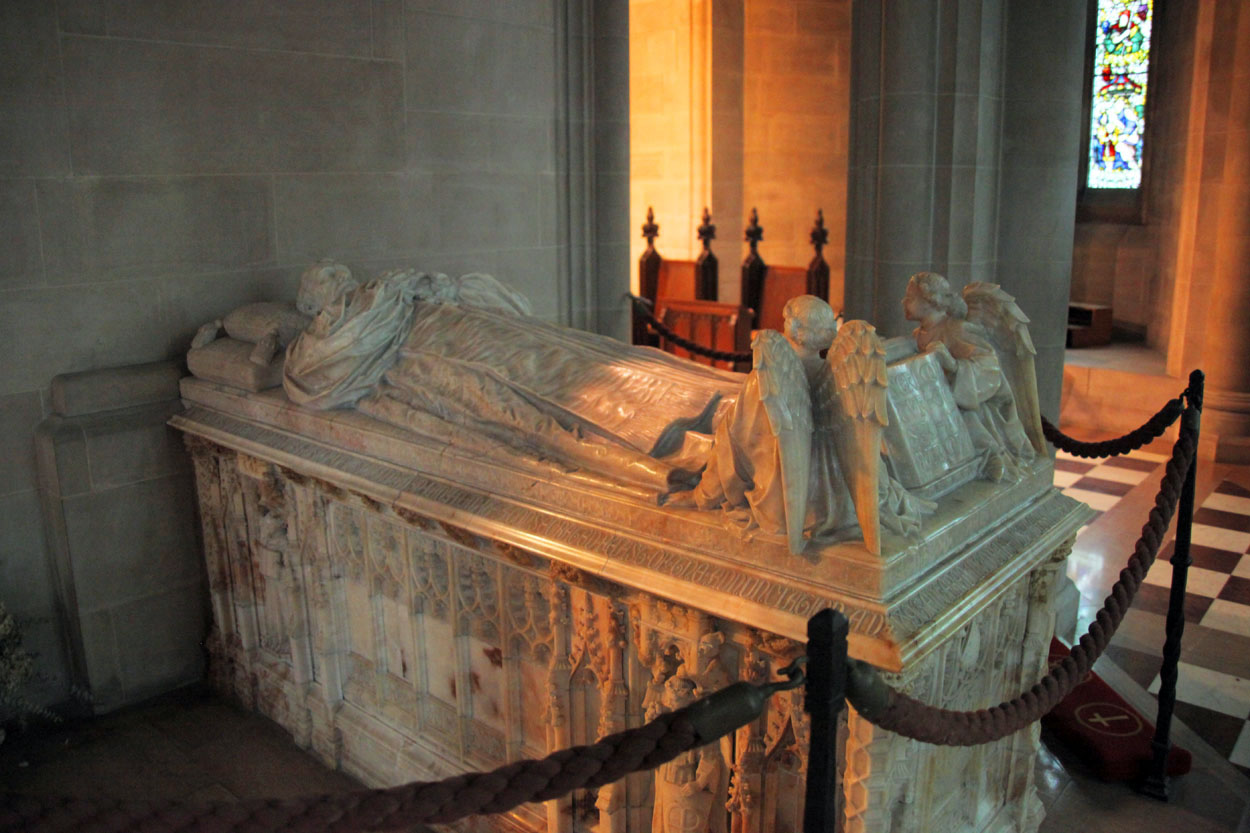
The tomb of Bishop Satterlee, first Episcopal bishop of Washington.

The chapel is constructed in the Gothic style. The chapel is particularly noted for its series of five stained-glass windows located behind the altar, which narrate the Nativity story. These were the first windows made for the cathedral, made in 1912. The windows are thematically arranged to tell the story of Christ's birth. It here that Bishop Satterlee, the guiding light of the cathedral was laid to rest, behind the reredos and altar. The chapel was also the site of the burial rites for President Woodrow Wilson in 1924; his remains were entombed in the chapel for over three decades before being moved to a permanent memorial bay on the cathedral's main level.

==== The Chapel of the Resurrection ====
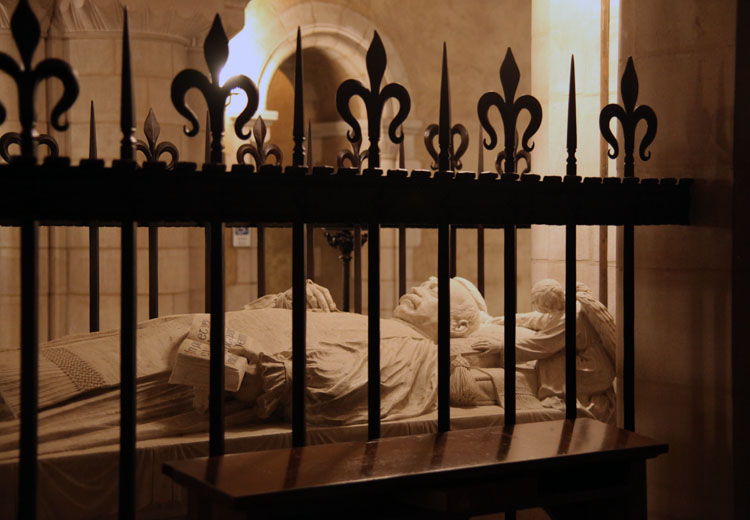
The tomb of Bishop Harding and his wife and son

The Chapel of the Resurrection completed on 15 June 1925 is located on the crypt level of the cathedral, beneath the south transept. It is built in the Norman style, with semi-circular arches and a half-domed ceiling. Construction had begun under Bishop Alfred Harding, the second Episcopal bishop of Washington, but he died in 1923 before it was finished. His family asked that the chapel celebrate life rather than death, which gave the chapel its name. It serves as a memorial to him. It also serves as his, his wife, and infant son's final resting place.

The sanctuary of the Resurrection Chapel.

The chapel remained unadorned for decades until, in 1951, Philip Frohman commissioned the Art Deco artist Hildreth Meière to design a mosaic for the half-dome of the apse behind the altar. There were a number of designs before the final one was chosen. Models for the soldiers and angels included altar boys and choir boys from the cathedral.

Facing the rear of the Resurrection Chapel.

The chapel is unique within the cathedral in that all of its decoration is in tile mosaic. Six recessed panels along the north and west walls depict the post-Resurrection appearances of Jesus. They were designed by Rowan LeCompte and his wife Irene and completed in 1972. The six mosaics depict the period after Christ's Resurrection to his Ascension into Heaven. Irene LeCompte, who died in 1970 before the mosaics were finished, served as the model for Mary Magdalene.

==== The Cathedral Center for Prayer and Pilgrimage ====
This space of the cathedral has been through several iterations of both a secular (as an office, and as an embalming room) and religious nature (a sacristy) before it's present incarnation. It is, in this way somewhat similar to the Chapel of the Good Shepherd. The Cathedral Center for Prayer and Pilgrimage, however, had also originally been a Chapel dedicated to Saint Dunstan, Abbott of Glastonbury Abbey from the 10th Century. This space is notable also for being the location of the first of the many windows which were commissioned and designed by Rowan LeCompte. LeCompte had been 16 at the time he was commissioned for the two windows in the room.

=== Grotesques and gargoyles ===
The theme of human imperfection is also expressed more literally in the cathedral's exterior ornamentation, where the carvers' individual artistry (and occasional humor) is on full display. Numerous grotesques and gargoyles adorn the exterior, most of them designed by the carvers; one of the more famous of these is a caricature of then-master carver Roger Morigi on the north exterior of the nave. There were also two competitions held for the public to provide designs to supplement those of the carvers. The second of these produced the famous Darth Vader grotesque which is high on the northwest tower, sculpted by Jay Hall Carpenter and carved by Patrick J. Plunkett.

=== West facade and sculptural program ===
The west facade follows an iconographic program of Creation rather than that of the Last Judgement as was traditional in medieval churches. All of the sculptural work was designed by Frederick Hart and features tympanum carvings of the creation of the Sun and Moon over the outer doors and the creation of man over the center. Hart also sculpted the three statues of Adam and Saints Peter and Paul. The west doors are cast bronze rather than wrought iron. The west rose window, often used as a trademark of the cathedral, was designed by Rowan LeCompte and is an abstract depiction of the creation of light. LeCompte, who also designed the nave's clerestory windows and the mosaics in the Resurrection Chapel, chose a nonrepresentational design because he feared that a figural window could fail to be seen adequately from the great distance to the nave.

=== Churchill Porch ===
Located in the south narthex, the Churchill Porch serves as a permanent memorial to British Prime Minister Sir Winston Churchill, dedicated to his leadership during World War II and his advocacy for Transatlantic solidarity. The Porch was dedicated on September 30, 1974. A triple-lancet stained glass window was commissioned for the porch from English artist John Piper, which was realized with his regular collaborator, glassmaker Patrick Reyntiens. It depicts the Tree of Life in yellow on a deep blue background. The window is titled Land is Bright, a quote taken from a wartime speech made by Churchill, itself drawing on Arthur Hugh Clough's 1855 poem Say Not the Struggle Naught Availeth.

=== Images of architectural details ===
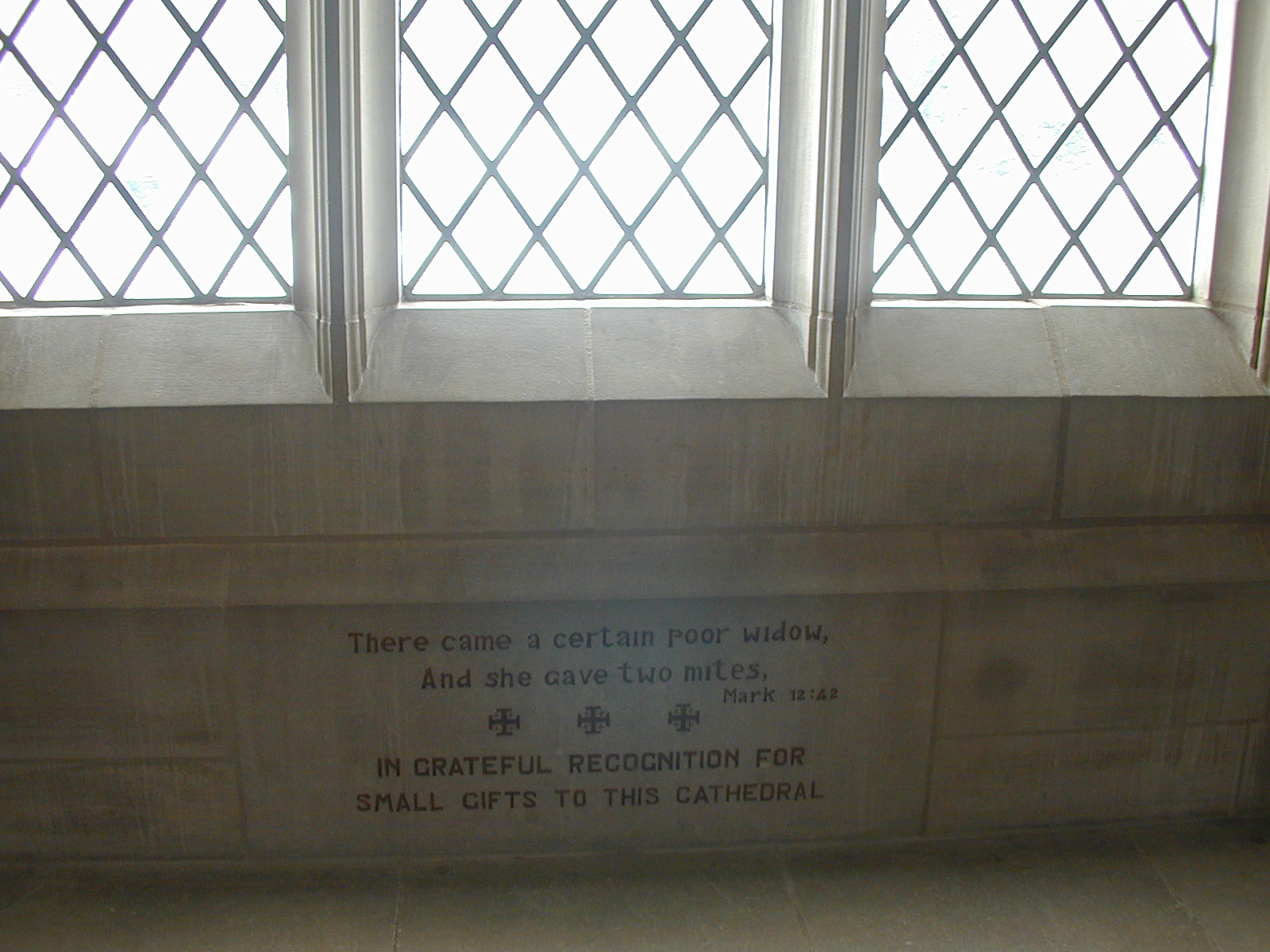
Donation Thanks Engraving

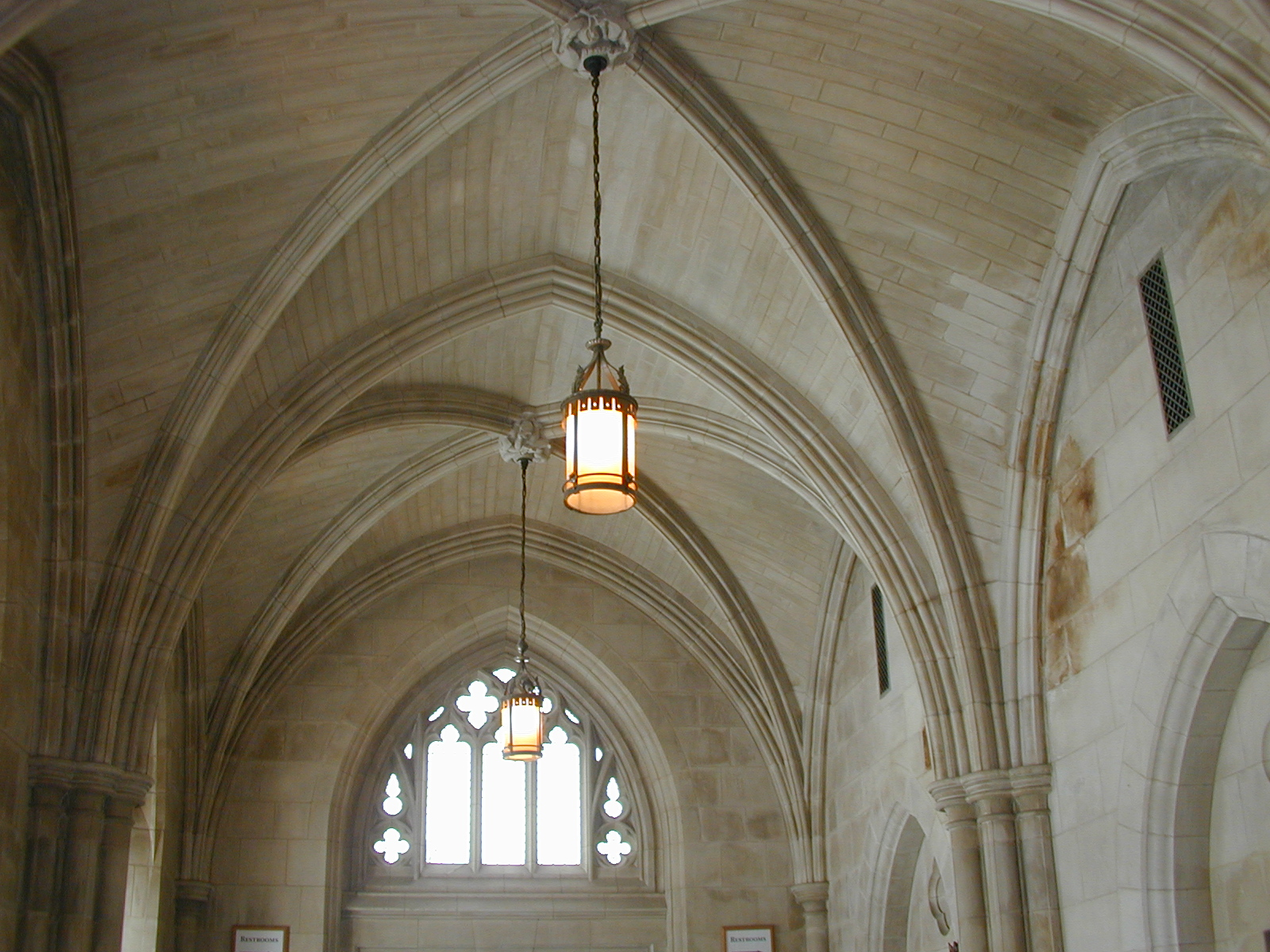
Vaulting in northwest cloister

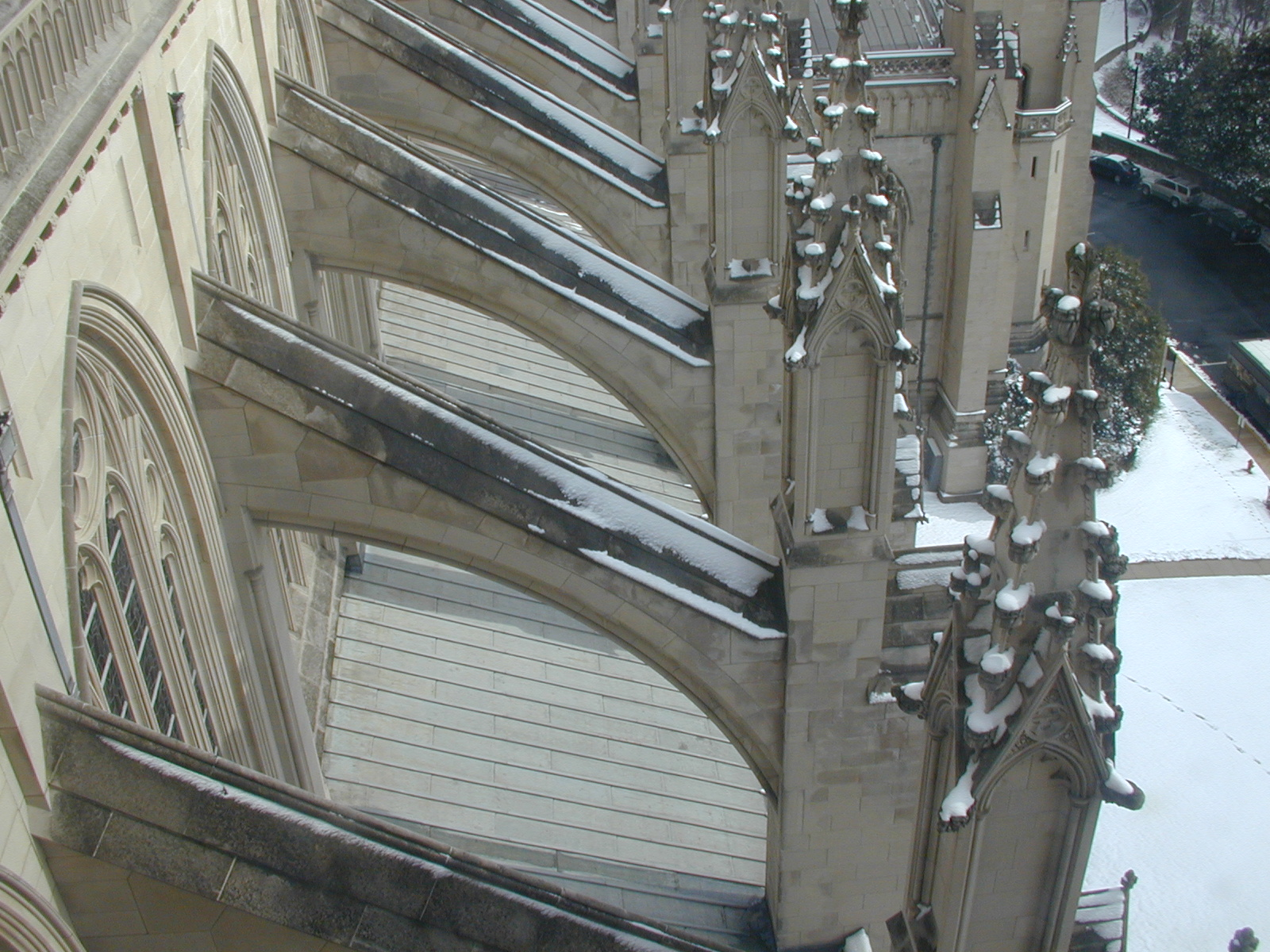
Flying buttresses

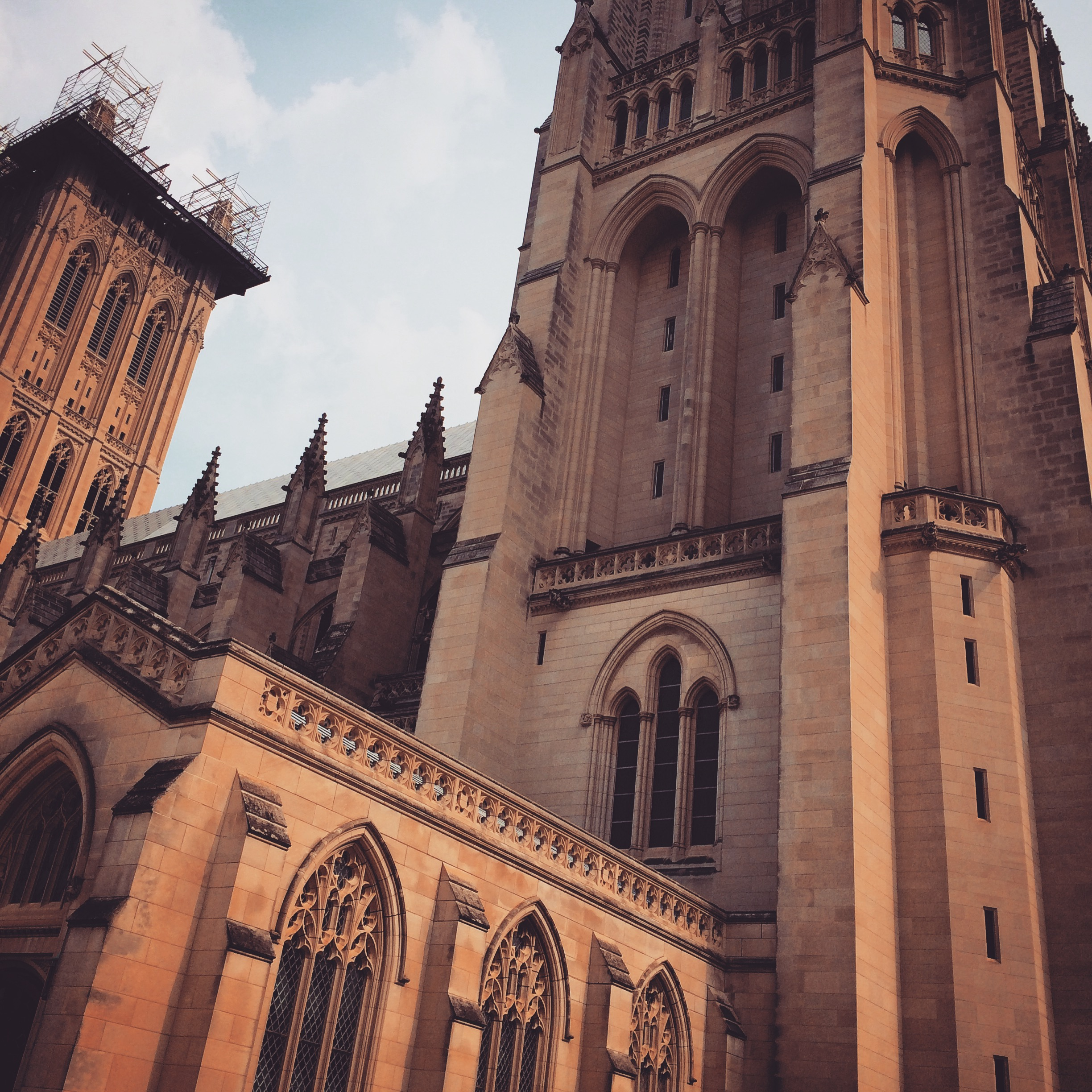
Side view of Washington National Cathedral, with earthquake construction

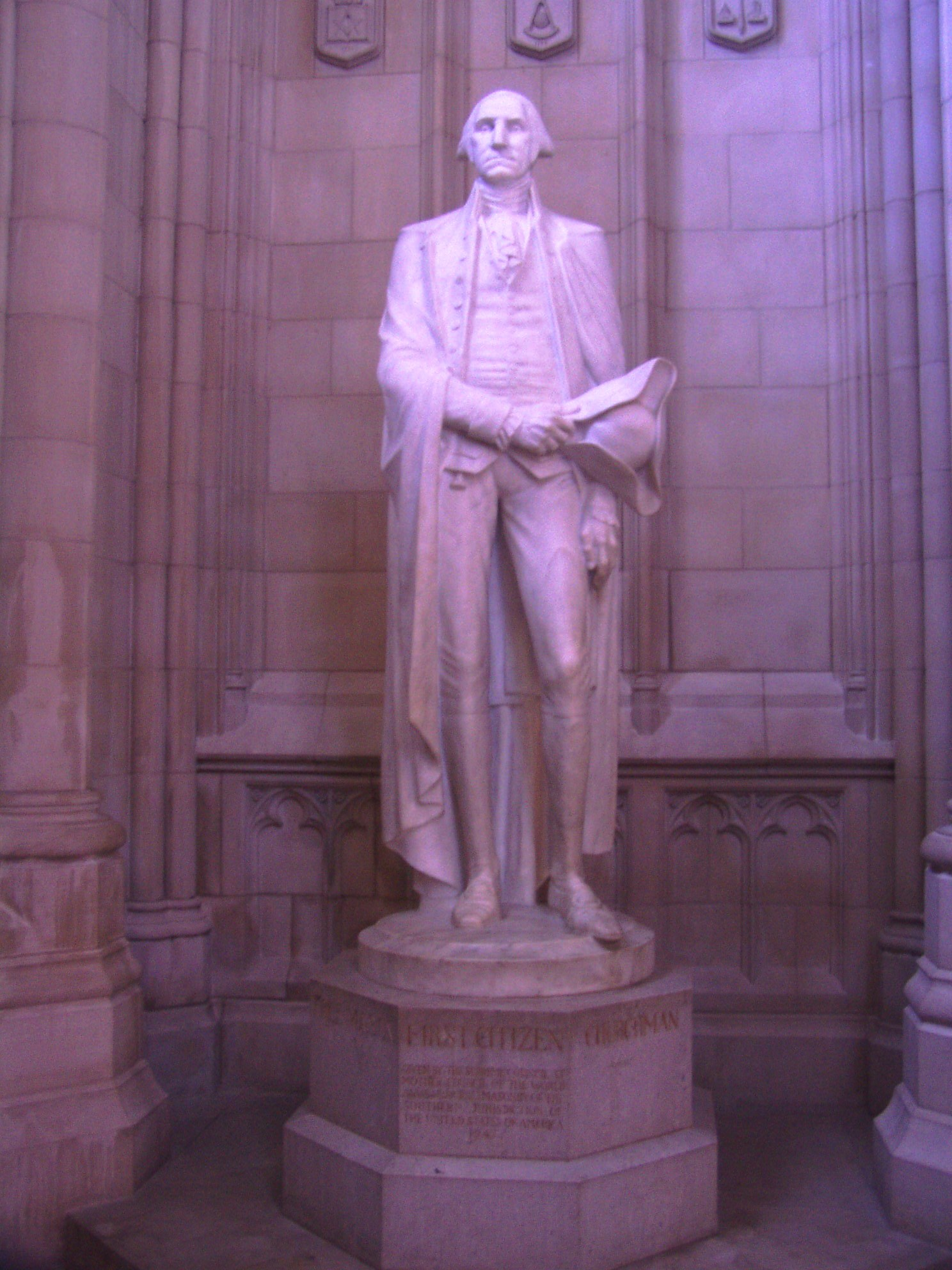
Statue of George Washington (by Lee Lawrie)

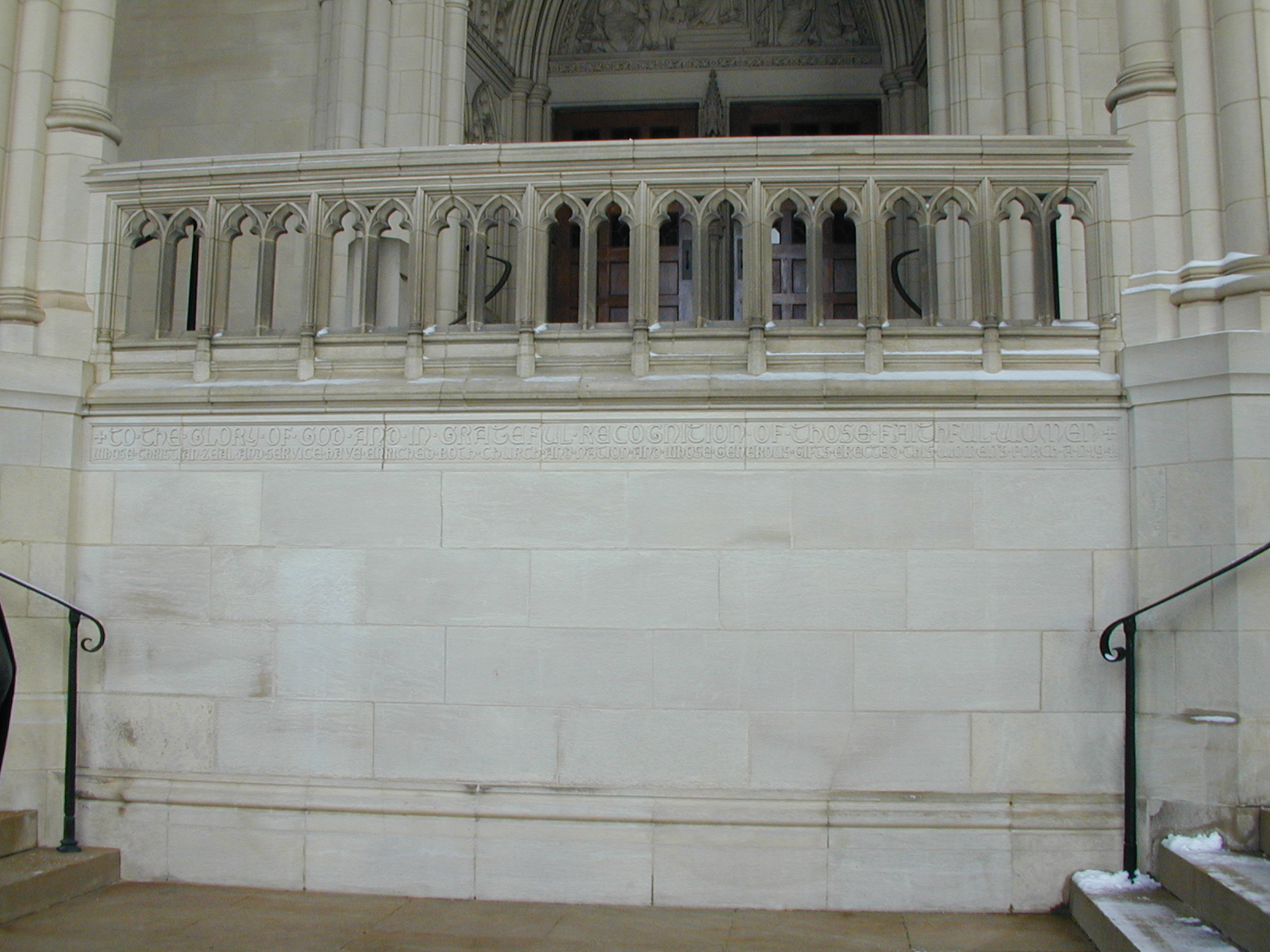
Women's porch

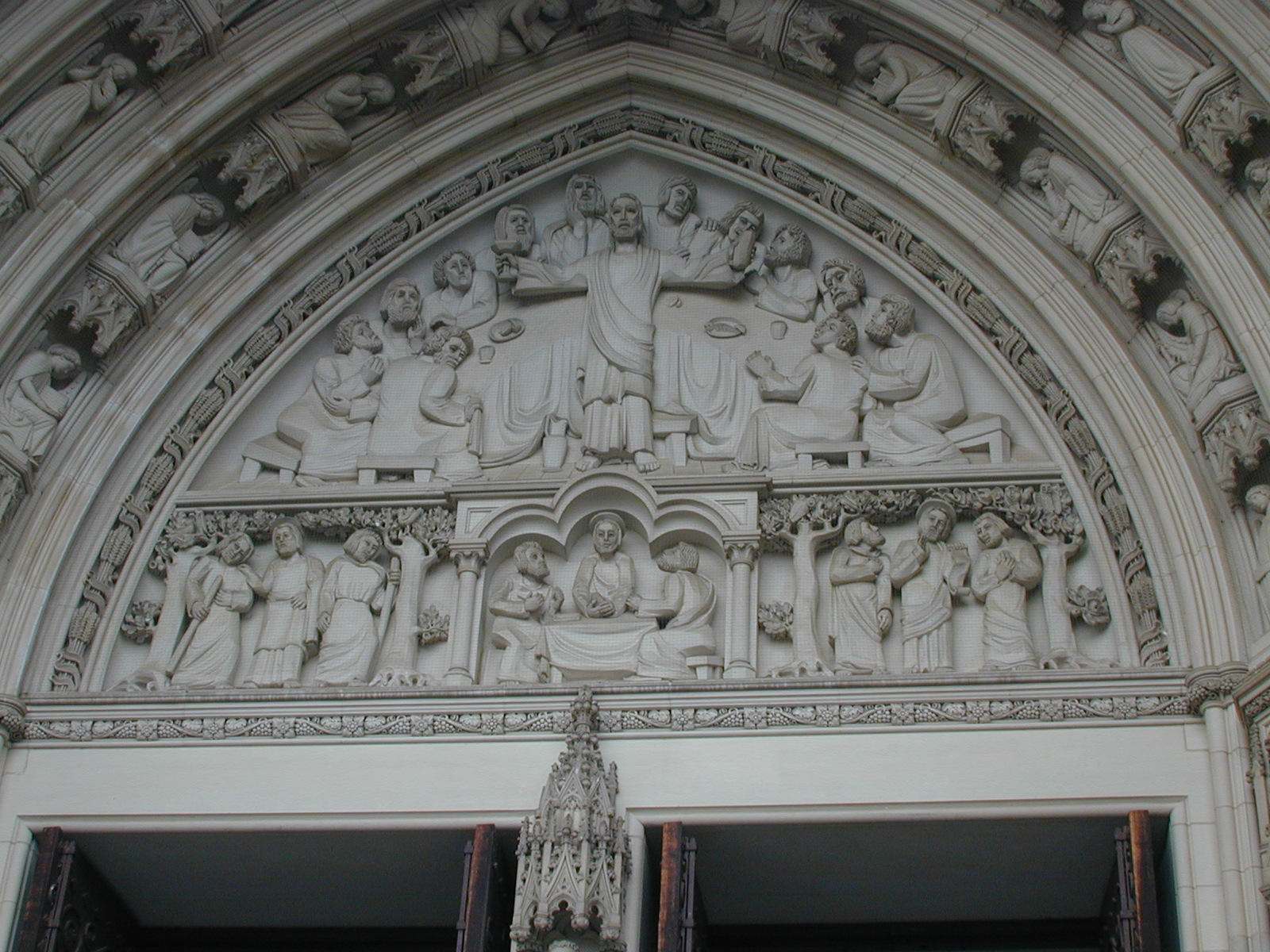
South transept tympanum

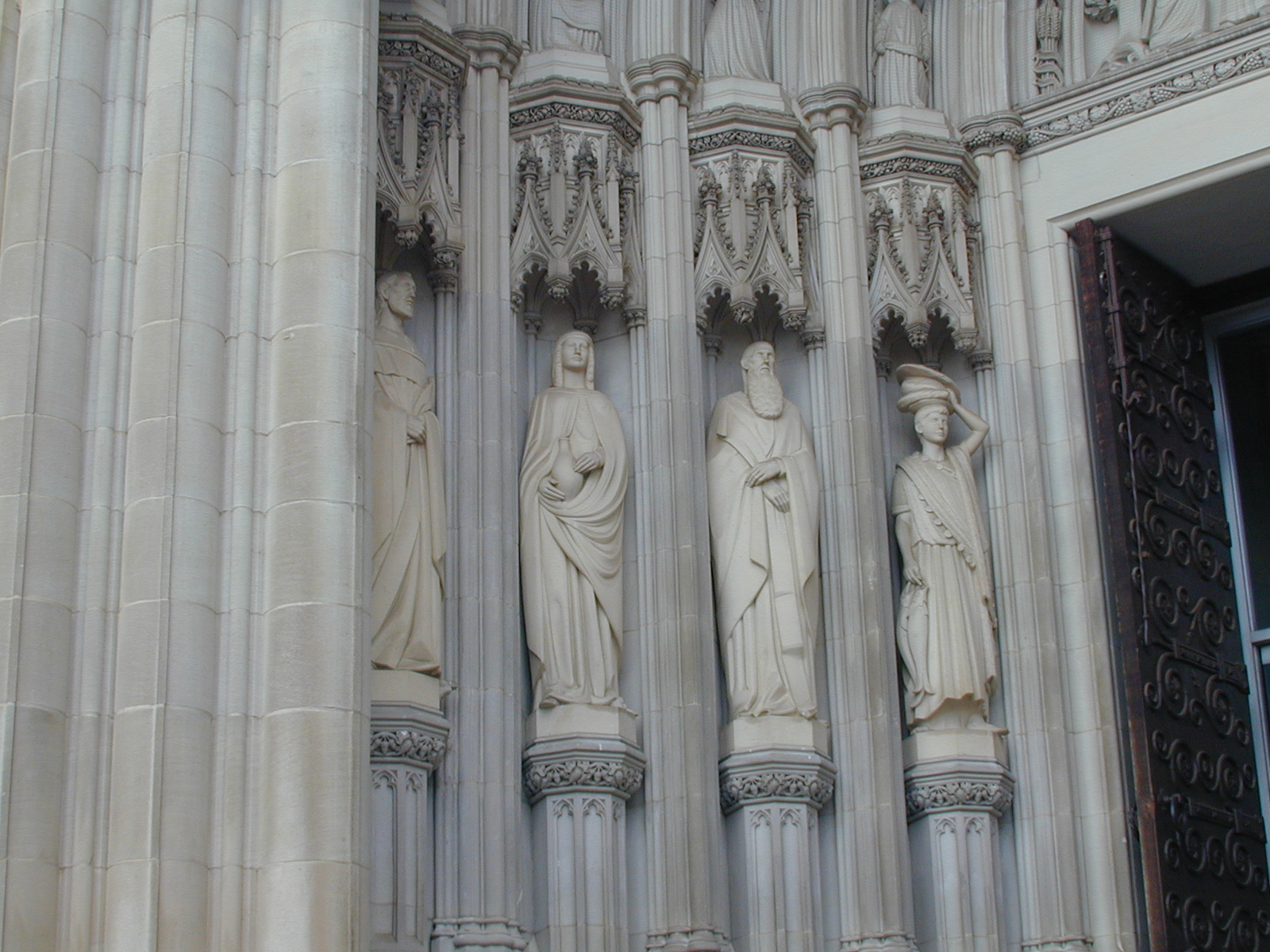
Detail of figures flanking south doors

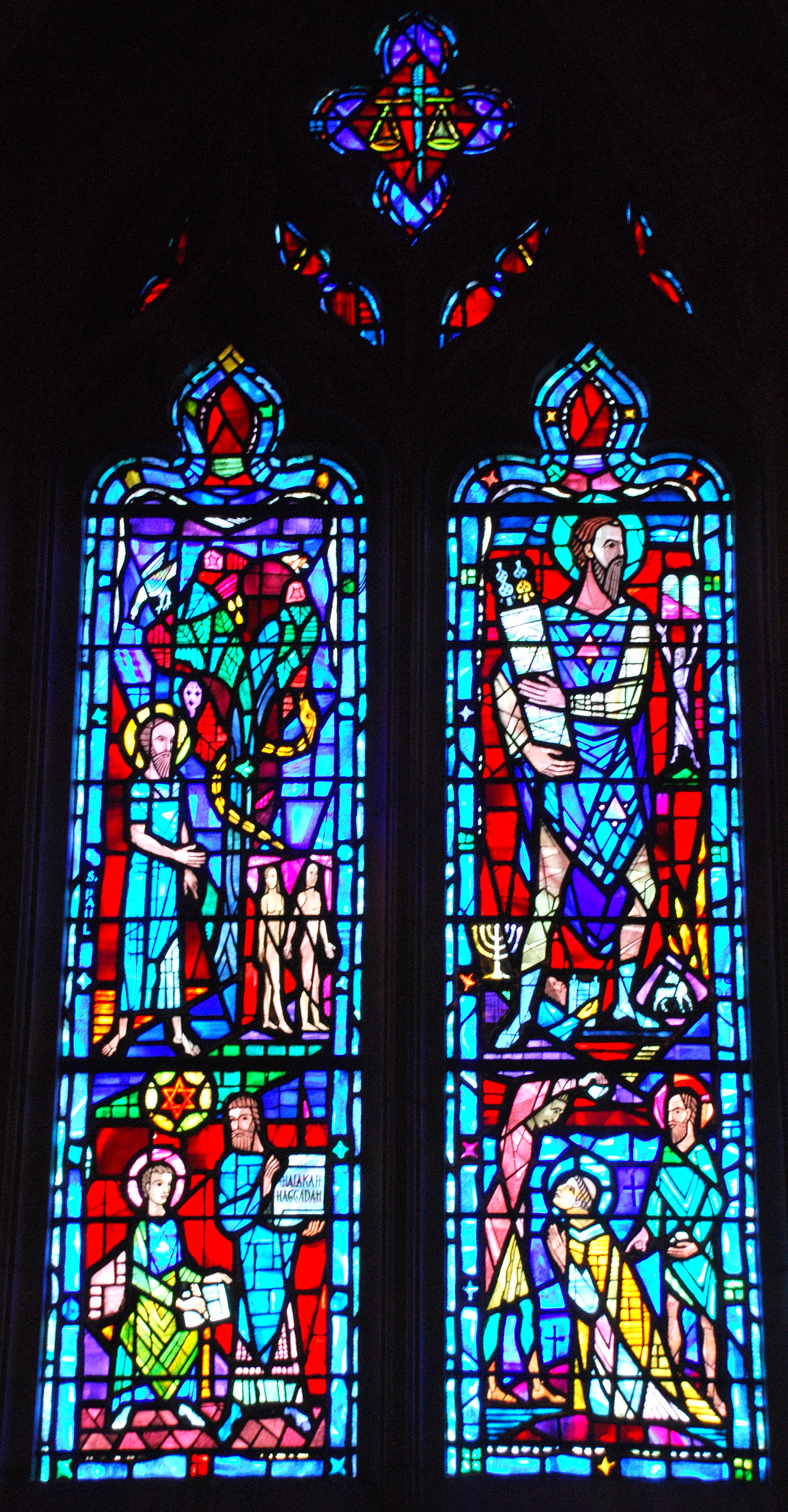
Stained glass depicting Adam & Eve and Moses, dedicated to Charles Warren

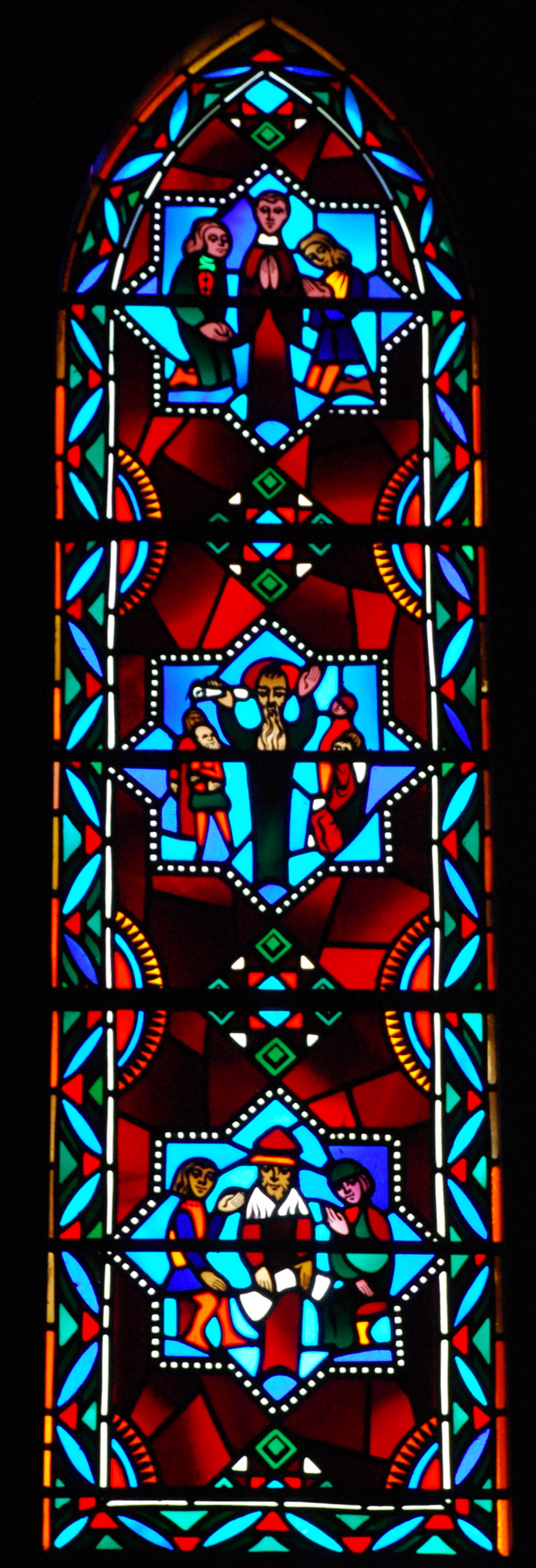
Stained glass dedicated to Andrew Carnegie

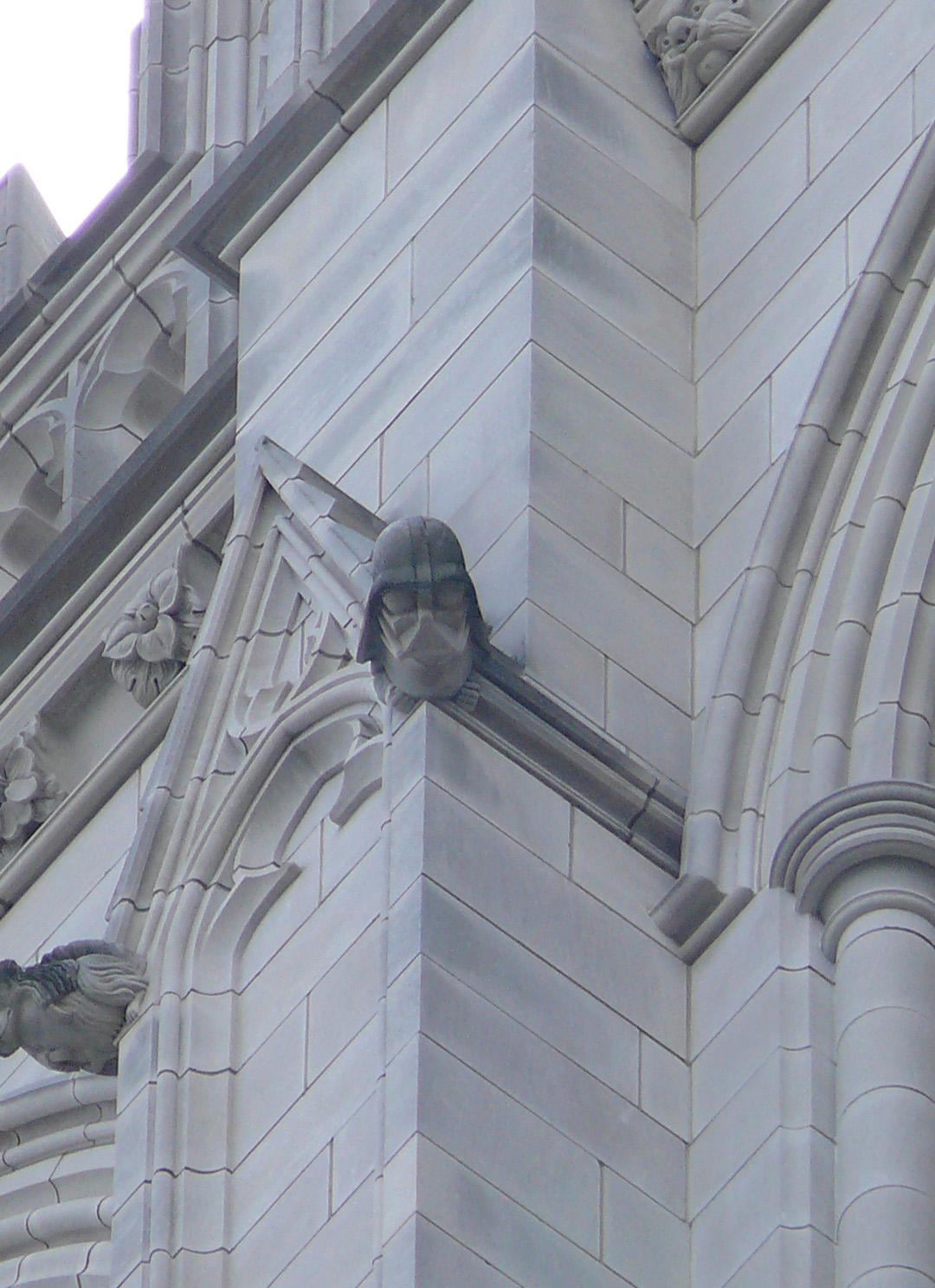
Darth Vader grotesque

The rood in the chancel arch, high above the rood screen ending the nave

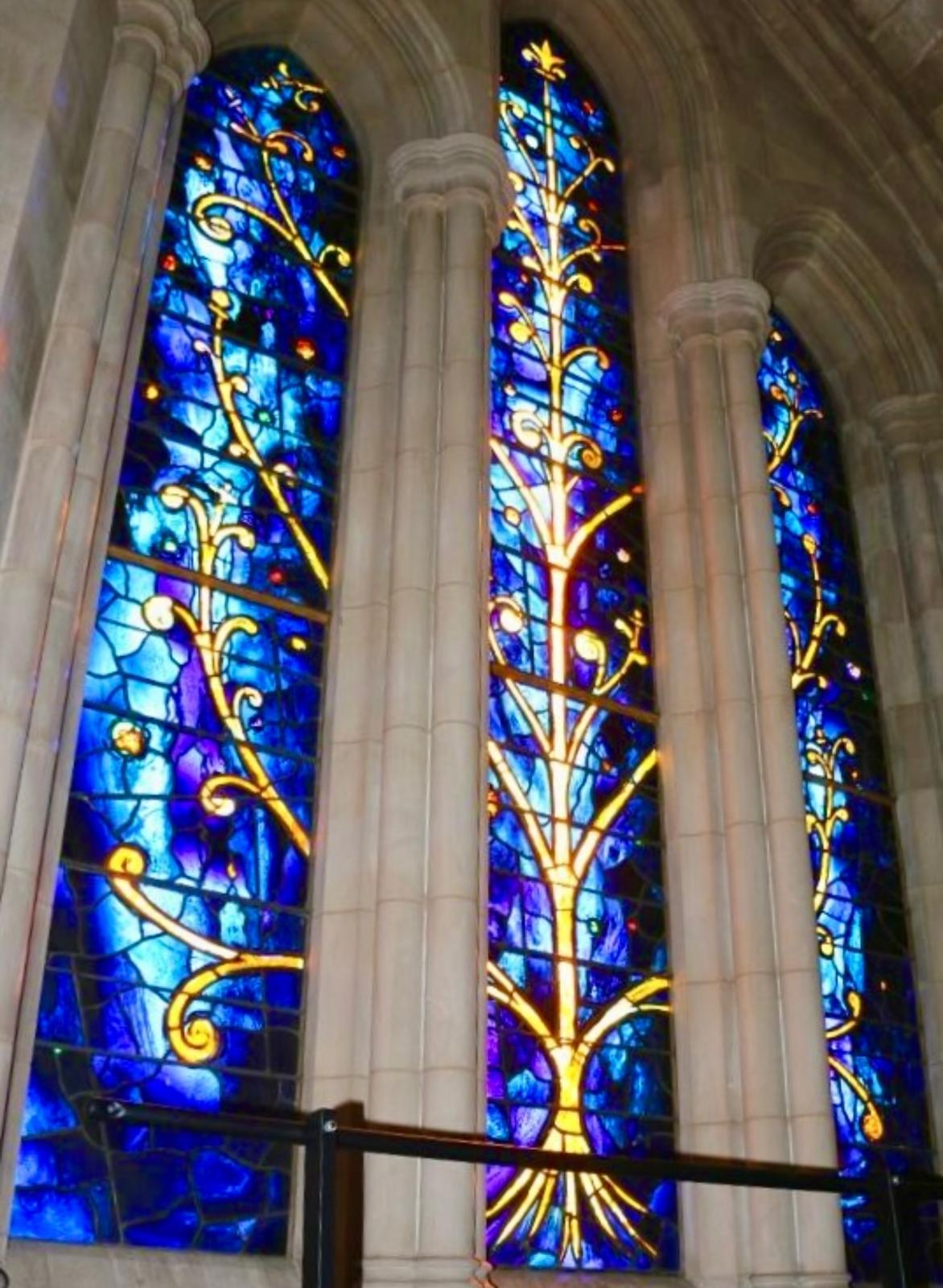
Land is Bright window by John Piper in the Churchill Porch

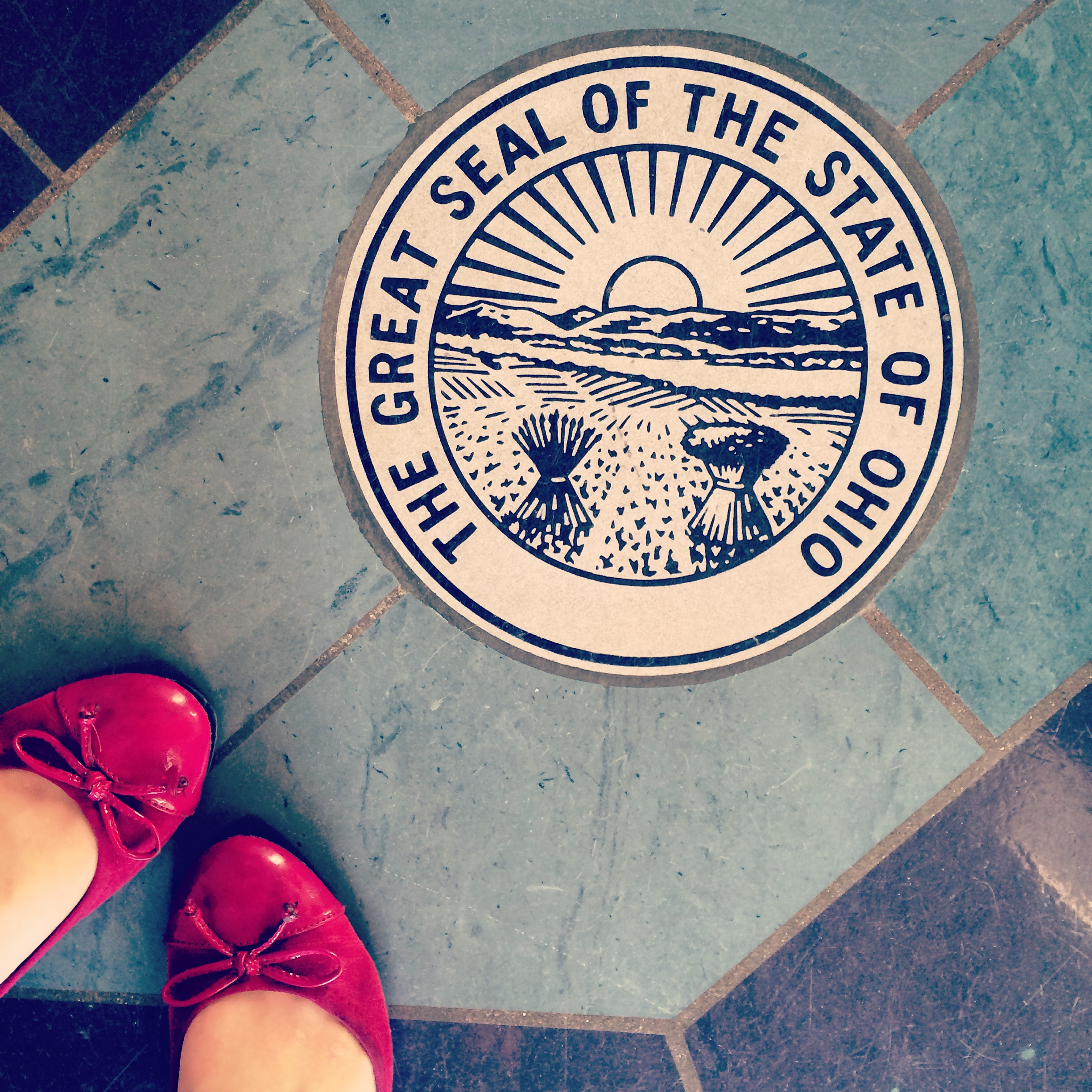
An example of one of the 50 State Seals (in this case Ohio, near the entrance) embedded in the floor of the National Cathedral narthex

== Grounds including the Bishop's Garden ==
On the Cathedral grounds, the Bishop's Garden, originally designed as a private garden by the notable landscape architect Frederick Law Olmsted Jr. has long been a public one, thanks to the efforts of landscape designer Florence Bratenahl, who was also the wife of the first dean of the cathedral. A Norman stone arch serves as the north entrance. Stone paths wend past St. Catherine's pool, a gazebo, sculptures, and plants including boxwood, historic herbs, and roses. This three-acre garden has been called “among the city’s most peaceful and pleasant places.”

== Leadership and funding ==
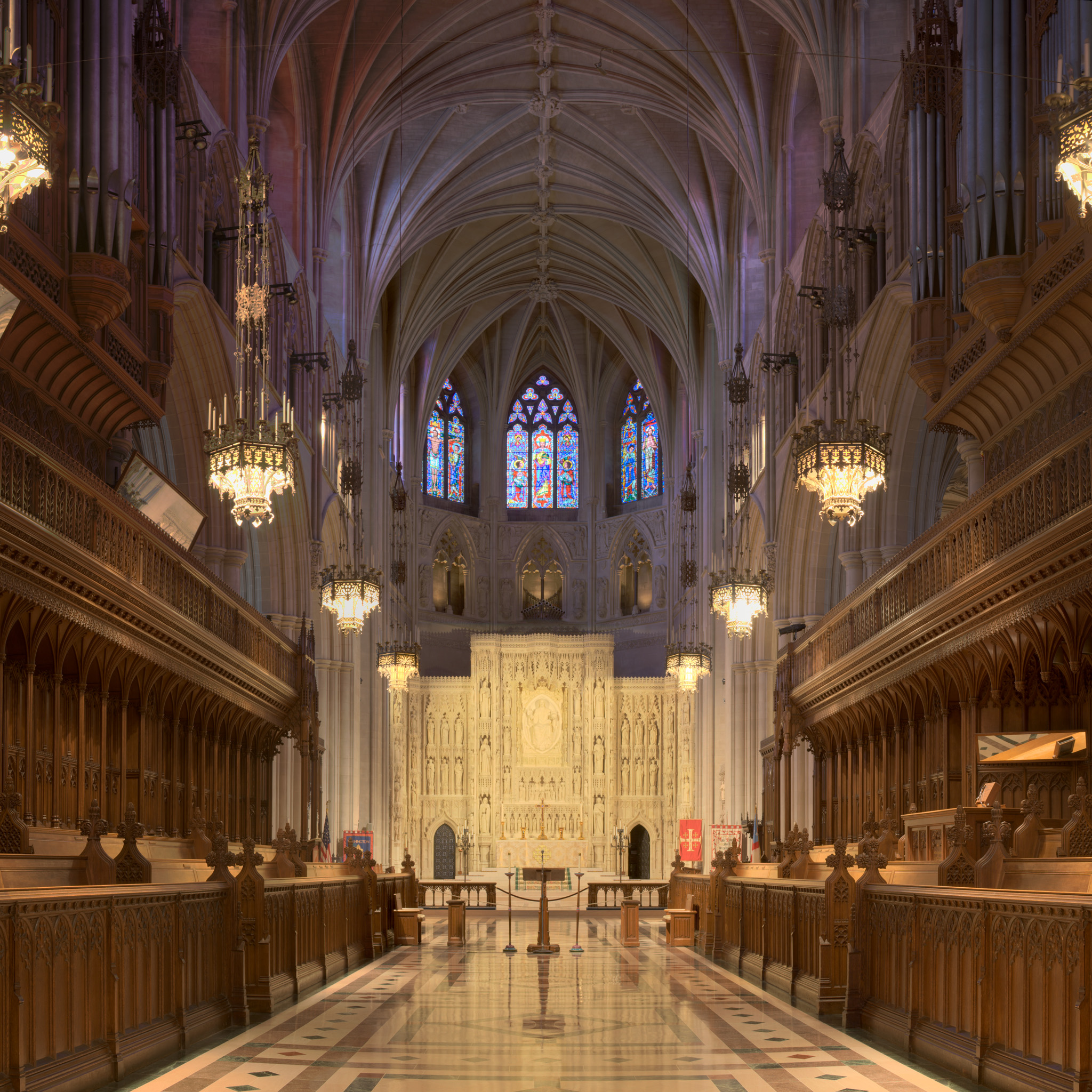
East End of the cathedral, with the Ter Sanctus reredos, featuring 110 carved figures surrounding the central figure of Jesus.

The cathedral is both the episcopal seat of the Bishop of Washington (currently Mariann Edgar Budde) and the primatial seat of the Presiding Bishop of the Episcopal Church (currently Sean Rowe). Budde was elected by the Episcopal Diocese of Washington in June 2011, to replace Bishop John Bryson Chane; upon her confirmation in November 2011 she became the ninth bishop of the diocese and the first woman to fill the role. John Walker, the sixth bishop of the Episcopal Diocese of Washington, was its first African American bishop.

The National Cathedral Association (NCA) began in 1899 to help raise funds to build the cathedral. Across the United States, it has more than 14,000 members, more than 88 percent of whom live outside the Washington area, and who are divided into committees by state. Supporters who give at least $60 per year are automatically enrolled in the NCA, which includes free admission to the cathedral and other benefits.

The budget, $27 million in 2008, was trimmed to $13 million in 2010. Staff was reduced from 170 to 70. There was an endowment of $50 million. The current 2024-2025 budget has grown back to approximately $25 million (approximately $17 million in inflation-adjusted 2008 dollars).

=== Cathedral leadership ===
Gary R. Hall was chosen to be the 10th dean of Washington National Cathedral in July 2012. Hall retired as dean on December 31, 2015.

In May 2016, Randolph Marshall Hollerith was named as the next dean of the cathedral. Hollerith came to the National Cathedral from St. James Episcopal Church in Richmond, Virginia, where he was rector from 2000 to 2016.

Cathedral deans

- Alfred Harding (de facto; 1909–1916)
- George C. F. Bratenahl (1916–1936)
- Noble C. Powell (1937–1941)
- ZeBarney T. Phillips (1941–1942)
- John W. Suter (1944–1950)
- Francis B. Sayre Jr. (1951–1978)
- John T. Walker (1978–1989; simultaneously bishop)
- Nathan D. Baxter (1991–2003)
- Samuel T. Lloyd III (2005–2011)
- Gary R. Hall (2012–2015)
- Randolph Marshall Hollerith (2016–present)

Cathedral clergy

- Provost: The Rev. Canon Jan Naylor Cope
- Canon Vicar: The Rev. Canon Dana Colley Corsello
- Canon Precentor: The Rev. Canon Rosemarie Logan Duncan
- Canon Missioner & Minister of Equity and Inclusion: The Rev. Canon Leonard Hamlin Sr.
- Canon Theologian: The Rev. Canon Kelly Brown Douglas
- Priest Associate for Worship: The Rev. Patrick L. Keyser
- Priest Associate for Congregation: The Rev. Spencer W. Brown
- Canon Historian: Jon Meacham (non-clergy)

Executive Leadership

- Chief of Staff and Chief Operating Officer: Lauralyn Lee
- Chief Financial and Administrative Officer: Maureen McGinniss
- Chief Development Officer: Vanessa B. Andrews
- Chief Public Affairs Officer: VACANT

== Worship ==
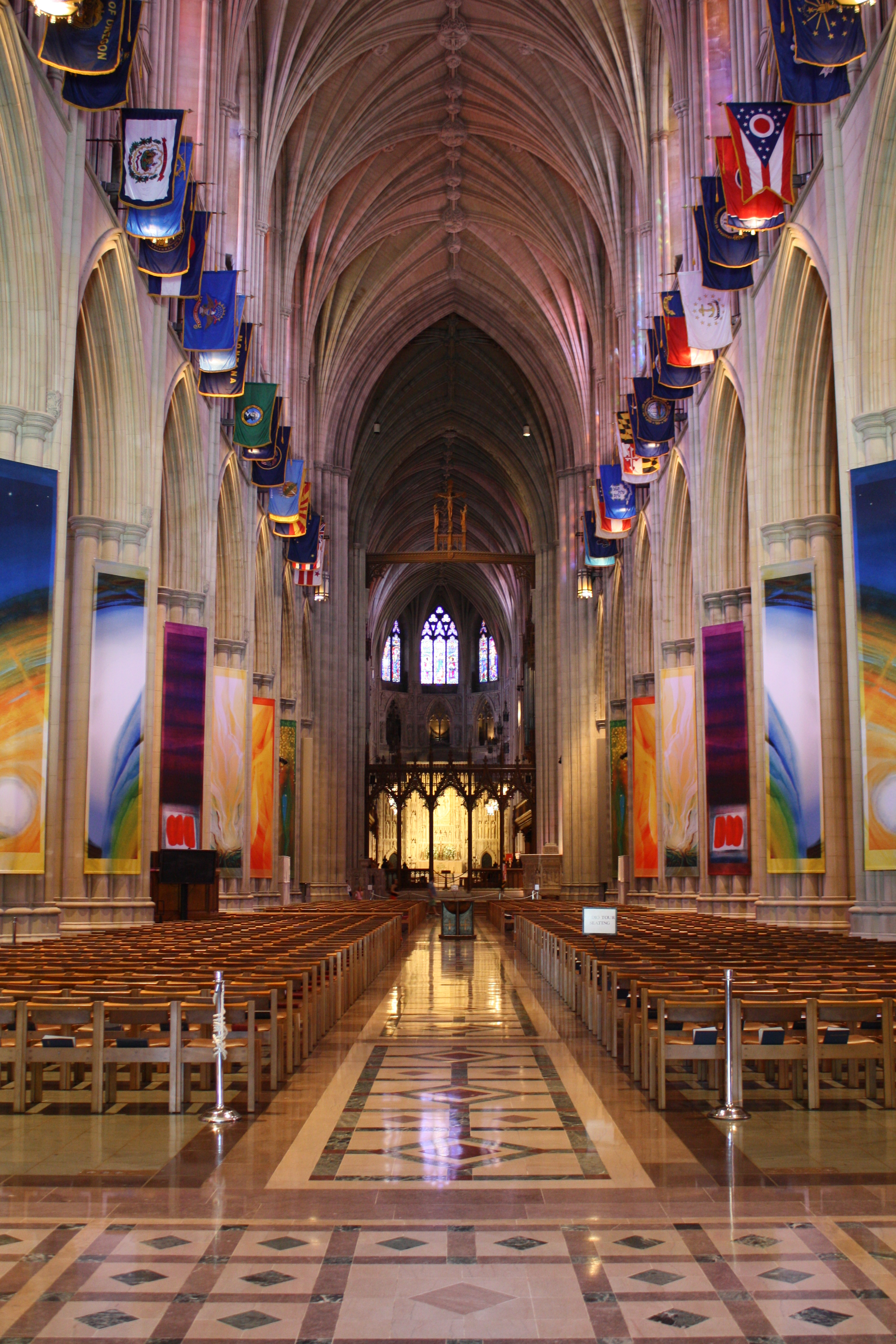
The flags of all the states of the US with the current liturgical banners hung on the pillars

The worship department is, like the cathedral itself, rooted in the doctrine and practice of the Episcopal Church, and based in the Book of Common Prayer. Weekday services of Morning Prayer are offered by Cathedral clergy online. From September through May, the cathedral choirs sing Evensong Sunday through Thursday. Two services of the Eucharist are held on Sundays, along with Choral Evensong. The cathedral's current Canon Precentor is the Rev. Canon Rosemarie Logan Duncan.

The cathedral also has been a temporary home to several congregations, including a Jewish synagogue and an Eastern Orthodox community. It has also been the site for several ecumenical and interfaith services. In October 2005, at the cathedral, the Rev. Nancy Wilson was consecrated and installed as moderator (denominational executive) of the Metropolitan Community Church, by its founding moderator, the Rev. Troy Perry.

Each Christmas, the cathedral holds special services, which are broadcast to the world. The Christmas service at the cathedral was broadcast to the nation on television from 1953 until 2010 and is still webcast live from the cathedral's homepage and its YouTube channel.

Following the COVID-19 pandemic, the Cathedral stopped offering their 9am Contemporary Eucharist, thus only offering the 8am Holy Eucharist (said) and the 11:15 Principal Holy Eucharist. The 11:15 service typically features a blended worship style with music offered by the Cathedral Choir and Cathedral Contemporary Ensemble.

== Music ==
Cathedral Music Department

- Director of Music: Dr. Jared Johnson (2026-)
- Associate Director of Music & Chorister Program Manager: Julie DeBoer (2022-)
- Associate Director of Music for Contemporary Worship: Michele Fowlin (2022-)
- Associate Director of Music & Organist: Edward Hewes (2025-)
- Carillonneur: Dr. Edward Nassor (1990-)

The First Director of Music was Edgar Priest (1910–1935), he was followed by Robert George Barrow (1935–1939), Paul Callaway (1939–1977), Richard Wayne Dirksen (1977–1988), Douglas Major (1988–2002), and Michael McCarthy (2003–2024). Organists and Choirmasters include Bruce Neswick, James Litton, Erik Wm. Suter, Scott Dettra, Christopher (Kit) Jacobson, Jeremy Filsell, Christopher Betts, The Rev. Benjamin Pearce Straley, Dr. Thomas Sheehan, George Fergus, Rebecca Ehren, Ariana Corbin, Mina Marie-Jelinek and Edward Hewes. In September 2024, Michael McCarthy stepped down as Canon for Music and Director of Institutional Planning after nearly 21 years and Dr. Thomas Sheehan left his role as Cathedral Organist to take up the Director of Music position at Christ Church Cathedral, Montreal in June 2025.

=== Choirs ===
The Washington National Cathedral Choir of Men and Boys, founded in 1909, is one of very few cathedral choirs of men and boys in the United States with an affiliated school, in the English choir tradition. The eighteen to twenty-two boys singing treble are of ages 8 to 14 and attend St. Albans School, the Cathedral school for boys, on vocal scholarships.

In 1997, the Cathedral Choir of Men and Girls was formed by Bruce Neswick, using the same men as the choir of the men and boys. The Choir consists of middle and high school girls attending the National Cathedral School on vocal scholarships. The two choirs currently share service duties and occasionally collaborate.

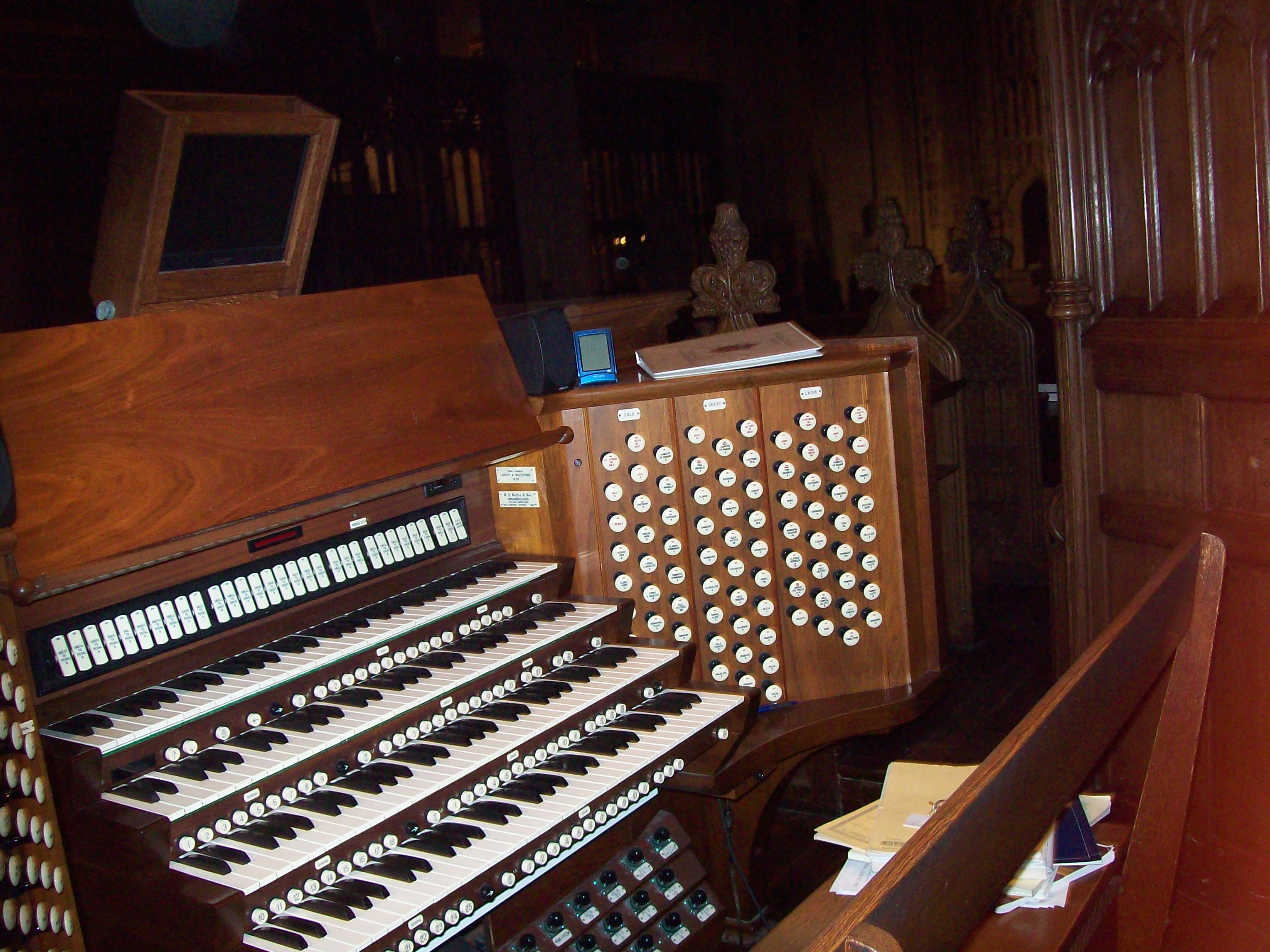
The console of the Great Organ at Washington National Cathedral in 2010. It includes four manuals: the Choir, Great, Swell, and Solo. It is located in the Great Choir.

Both choirs have recorded several CDs, including a Christmas album; a U.S. premiere recording of Ståle Kleiberg's Requiem for the Victims of Nazi Persecution in 2004; and a patriotic album, America the Beautiful in 2005.

The choirs rehearse separately every weekday morning in a graded class incorporated into their school schedule. The choristers sing Evensong five days a week (the Boys Choir on Tuesdays and Thursdays and the Girls Choir on Mondays and Wednesdays). The choirs alternate Sunday worship duties, singing both morning Eucharist and afternoon Evensong when they are on call. The choirs also sing for numerous state and national events. The choirs are featured annually on Christmas at Washington National Cathedral, broadcast nationally on Christmas Day.

As of Fall 2024, the chorister schedule has adapted as a result of post-COVID program challenges. The Choristers sing one Sunday morning monthly (boys and girls together), alternate Sunday Evensong services weekly, and the Girls Cathedral Choir sings Evensong on Wednesdays, and the Boys Cathedral Choir sings Evensong on Thursdays. All other services are sung by the (professional) Cathedral Choir.

The resident symphonic chorus of Washington National Cathedral is the Cathedral Choral Society.

=== The Great Organ ===
The Great Organ was installed by the Ernest M. Skinner & Son Organ Company in 1938. The original instrument consisted of approximately 8,400 pipes. The instrument was enlarged by the Aeolian-Skinner Organ Company in 1963 and again by a team of former Aeolian-Skinner employees between 1973 and 1976, during which time more than half of the original instrument was removed. Further mechanical work and minor tonal additions were carried out in the 1980s and 1990s. The present instrument consists of 189 ranks and 10,647 pipes.

==== Renovation ====
Although the instrument was mechanically restored in the late 1980s and early 1990s, the instrument's condition gradually deteriorated due to its constant use and damage from the 2011 earthquake. This meant that by 2023 a third of the instrument was unplayable, including the entire Solo division. Furthermore, it was determined that the mechanical layout of the organ's pipework created a confusing sonic effect for listeners, and that the instrument's focus on 1970s-era neoclassical principles had rendered it tonally obsolete. The organ was to be replaced with a new instrument built by Dobson Pipe Organ Builders, but this plan was scrapped in 2009.

As of 2023, plans are being developed for a renovation of the instrument. The organ will be renovated by Foley-Baker Inc. of Tolland, CT over a span of 4 years from 2024 to 2028 at the cost of $14 million, and is expected to reduce the size of the organ to 172 ranks and 9,787 pipes. It will include a complete removal of the instrument, and the addition of a suitable digital organ by the Walker Technical Company for the duration of the project. This renovation will include the addition of a new division within the Nave to improve the clarity of the organ to listeners within the Nave, a new mechanical chassis for the instrument, and the removal of some of the least successful pipes from the 1970s renovation. Approximately 50 ranks of pipes from the original 1938 instrument remain, and as many of these ranks will be reused as possible, as well as some of the pipes from the 1970s renovation. The rest of the instrument will consist of new pipework which will seamlessly integrate with what remains from the previous instrument.

On December 31, 2023, the temporary Walker organ was unveiled during worship services. The original pipe organ was removed over the course of several weeks and shipped to Foley-Baker for repairs.

=== Bells ===
The cathedral is unique in North America in having both a carillon and a set of change ringing bells.

The ring of 10 bells (tenor 32 long cwt 0 qr 4 lb; 3,588 lb or 1,627 kg in D) are hung in the English style for full circle ringing. All ten were cast in 1962 by Mears & Stainbank (now known as The Whitechapel Bell Foundry) of London, England.

The carillon has 53 bells ranging from 17 pounds (7.7 kg) to 24,000 pounds (11,000 kg) and was manufactured by John Taylor & Co of Loughborough, England in 1963. The bells are hung dead, meaning rigidly fixed, and are struck on the inside by hammers activated from the keyboard.

=== Contemporary music ===
In 2016, under the leadership of then-Associate for Worship and Music, the Rev. Dr. Andrew K. Barnett, the Cathedral transformed its 9:00am Sunday Eucharist into a BAS Communion Service with both contemporary language and music. This meant regular collaborations with Barnett's Theodicy Jazz Collective. Following Barnett's departure in 2019 (to All Saints, Atlanta), GRAMMY-Award nominee Daryl L.A. Hunt joined the cathedral as Associate Director of Music for Contemporary Worship where he expanded the Cathedral Band and focused the cathedral's contemporary music offerings towards African American spirituals and contemporary ensemble music. Since March 2020, the cathedral's Principal Sunday Eucharist at 11:15am has included a blend of contemporary and traditional music with contributions from Michele Fowlin, Associate Director of Music for Contemporary Worship.

== Important services ==
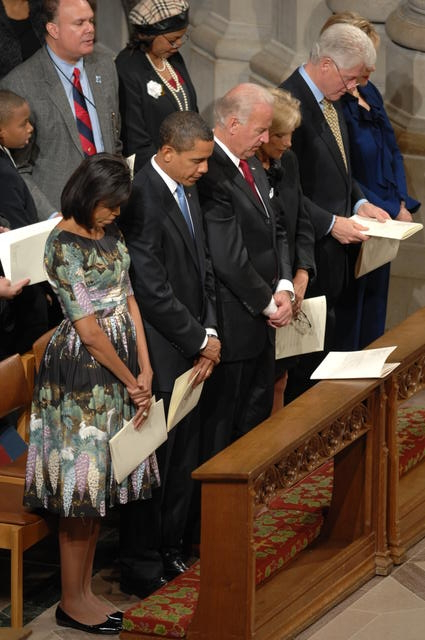
The National Prayer Service after the Inauguration of President Obama

=== Inaugural services ===
Presidential prayer services were held the day after the inaugurations for:

- 32nd President Franklin D. Roosevelt's second inauguration in January 1937
- 40th President Ronald Reagan's second inauguration in 1985
- 41st President George H. W. Bush's inauguration in 1989
- 43rd President George W. Bush's first and second inaugurations in 2001 and 2005
- 44th President Barack Obama's first and second inaugurations in 2009 and 2013
- 45th President Donald Trump's first inauguration in 2017
- 46th President Joe Biden's inauguration in 2021
- 47th President Donald Trump's second inauguration in 2025

State Funeral of President Carter

=== State funerals ===
State funerals for five American presidents have been held at the cathedral:

- 34th President Dwight D. Eisenhower (1969): lay in repose at the cathedral before lying in state
- 40th President Ronald Reagan (2004)
- 38th President Gerald Ford (2007)
- 41st President George H. W. Bush (2018)
- 39th President Jimmy Carter (2025)

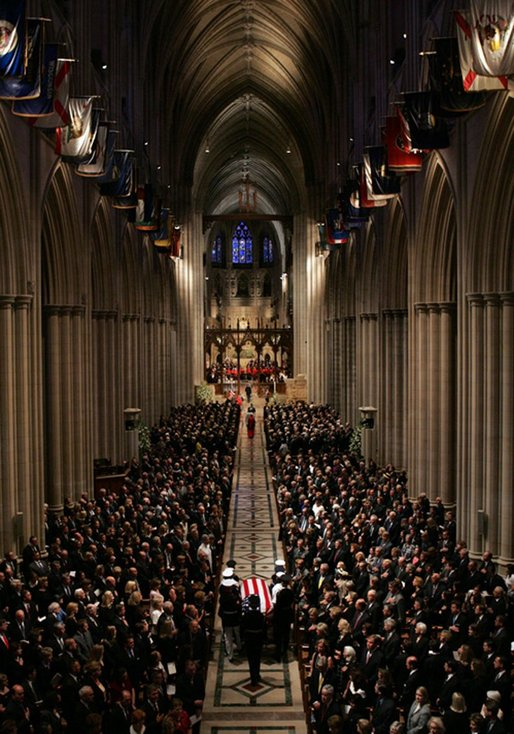
The 2004 state funeral of the 40th President, Ronald Reagan

=== Presidential memorial services ===
Memorial services were also held at the cathedral for the following presidents:

- 29th President Warren G. Harding
- 27th President William Howard Taft
- 30th President Calvin Coolidge
- 33rd President Harry S. Truman
- 37th President Richard Nixon

=== Other funerals, memorial services, and events ===
Other events have included:

- Funeral for former first lady Edith Wilson (1961)
- Memorial service for former first lady Eleanor Roosevelt (1962)
- Memorial service for Martin Luther King Jr. was held at the cathedral the week after he was assassinated on April 4, 1968.
- Memorial service and interment of Helen Keller (1968)
- Memorial service for the casualties of the Vietnam War on November 14, 1982
- Funeral for Supreme Court Justice Thurgood Marshall on January 29, 1993
- Funeral for Secretary of Commerce Ronald Brown (1996)
- Public funeral for Chief of Naval Operations, United States Navy, Admiral Jeremy Michael Boorda (1996)
- Funeral for U.S. Ambassador to France Pamela Harriman (1997)
- Memorial service following the death of Diana, Princess of Wales (September 6, 1997)
- Funeral for The Washington Post newspaper publisher Katharine Graham (2001)
- Memorial service for the victims of the September 11 attacks
- Special evensong for the victims of the Virginia Tech shooting
- Funeral for educator and national civil rights leader Dorothy Height (2010)
- Funeral for Charles Colson, founder of Prison Fellowship (2012)
- Memorial service for NASA astronaut and first person on the Moon Neil Armstrong (2012)

The public memorial service for Neil Armstrong in 2012

- Funeral for Senator Daniel Inouye of Hawaii, President Pro Tempore of the Senate, and Medal of Honor recipient (2012)
- Memorial service for former South African President and anti-apartheid activist Nelson Mandela (2014)
- Interfaith service of Prayer and Remembrance: The Fifteenth Anniversary of the September 11, 2001, attacks, Sunday September 11, 2016

Funeral service for Madelaine Albright in 2022

- March for Our Lives Prayer Vigil: A vigil for "activists, students and pilgrims" participating in the March for Our Lives anti-gun violence rally in Washington, D.C. and other cities, Friday March 23, 2018
- Funeral for U.S. Senator John McCain of Arizona (September 1, 2018)
- Service of Thanksgiving and Remembrance for Matthew Shepard (October 26, 2018).
- Funeral for U.S. Army General (Ret.), former Chairman of the Joint Chiefs of Staff and former Secretary of State Colin Powell (November 5, 2021).
- Funeral for U.S. Senator Bob Dole of Kansas (December 10, 2021)
- Funeral for former Secretary of State and diplomat Madeleine Albright (April 27, 2022)
- Memorial service following the death of Queen Elizabeth II (September 21, 2022)
- Funeral for former Supreme Court Justice Sandra Day O'Connor (December 19, 2023)
- Funeral for former Secretary of Defense and former Vice President Dick Cheney (November 20, 2025)
- Memorial service for U.S. Senator Lindsey Graham of South Carolina (July 28, 2026)

== Burials and interments ==
Burial and interment of ashes at the National Cathedral is at the pleasure of the reigning Bishop of Washington, and is reserved for those who have rendered extraordinary service to the Cathedral, the Nation or Humanity more generally. Over two hundred people are interred at the cathedral including several notable American citizens:

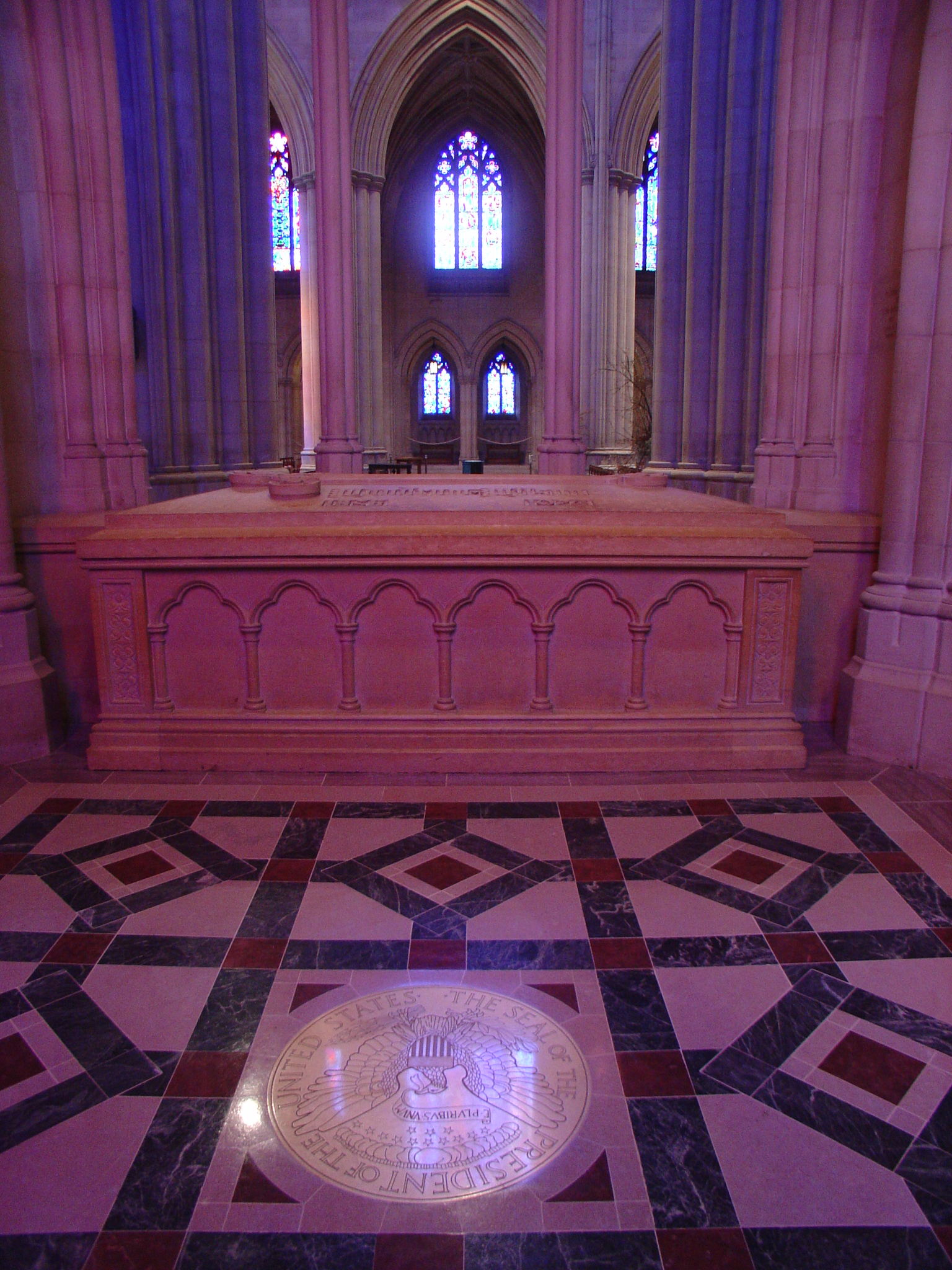
Woodrow Wilson's Tomb, 2006

- Joe Allbritton, banker, publisher and philanthropist
- Larz Anderson (ashes), diplomat, art collector. His wife Isabel Weld Perkins is entombed with him in the cathedral's St. Mary Chapel
- William Tapley Bennett Jr., A career U.S. diplomat who served as Ambassador to the Dominican Republic during the 1965 civil war and later as U.S. Permanent Representative to NATO
- Mabel Thorp Boardman, A prominent American philanthropist and key figure in the early history of the American Red Cross
- Joseph E. Davies (ashes), diplomat, presidential adviser. He donated a stained-glass window in the cathedral in honor of his mother, Rachel Davies (Rahel o Fôn)
- George Dewey, United States Navy admiral
- John Clifford Folger, An American investment banker and diplomat who served as the United States Ambassador to Belgium (1957-1959)
- Philip H. Frohman (ashes), cathedral architect, following the death of Bodley
- George A. Garrett, diplomat, first United States Ambassador to Ireland
- Cordell Hull, United States Secretary of State, Nobel Peace Laureate
- Helen Keller (ashes), author, lecturer, advocate for the blind and deaf
- Frank B. Kellogg, U.S. Secretary of State, Nobel Peace Laureate, buried at the Chapel of St. Joseph of Arimathea with his wife Clara Cook Kellogg.
- John Raleigh Mott, leader of the YMCA and World Student Christian Federation, Nobel Peace Laureate
- A.S. Mike Monroney (ashes), U.S. representative, senator
- Norman Prince, fighter pilot, member of the Lafayette Escadrille flying corps
- Francis Bowes Sayre Sr., A Harvard Law School professor and diplomat who served as High Commissioner to the Philippines and was a son-in-law of President Woodrow Wilson

The final resting place of Admiral Dewey

- Matthew Shepard (ashes), notable LGBT figure, victim of a hate crime
- John Wesley Snyder, Secretary of the Treasury in the Truman administration
- Leo Sowerby (ashes), composer, church musician
- Julia Dent Cantacuzène Spiransky-Grant, granddaughter of President Ulysses S. Grant
- Anne Sullivan (ashes), tutor and companion to Helen Keller, first woman interred here
- Stuart Symington, U.S. senator, presidential candidate
- Henry Vaughan, architect, associate of Bodley
- Thomas C. Wasson, diplomat and consul general for the United States in Jerusalem
- Isabel Weld Perkins (ashes), author, wife of Larz Anderson
- Henry White, A prominent American diplomat during the 1890s and 1900s, and one of the signers of the Treaty of Versailles
- Edith Wilson, second wife of Woodrow Wilson and First Lady of the United States
- Woodrow Wilson, 28th president of the United States. Wilson's tomb includes variants on the seal of the president of the United States and the coat of arms of Princeton University and the State of New Jersey. Wilson is the only American president buried in the District of Columbia.
- J. Butler Wright, A career U.S. diplomat who was serving as the United States Ambassador to Cuba at the time of his death

=== Clerical burials ===
It is traditional, in many Christian traditions, that the Bishops of a Diocese are interred in their cathedral, often along with their more distinguished priests.

==== Bishops of Washington ====
- Henry Y. Satterlee († 1908), 1st bishop of Washington
- Alfred Harding († 1923), 2nd bishop of Washington
- James E. Freeman († 1943), 3rd bishop of Washington
- Angus Dun († 1971, ashes), 4th bishop of Washington
- William F. Creighton († 1987), 5th bishop of Washington
- John T. Walker († 1989), 6th bishop of Washington
- Ronald H. Haines († 2008), 7th bishop of Washington

==== Other clergy ====
- Thomas John Claggett († 1816), re-interred at the Cathedral in 1898, the 1st bishop of Maryland, first Episcopal bishop consecrated on American Soil and therefore source of the United States' chain of Apostolic Succession.
- James Townsend Russell († 1929), Canon of the Cathedral from 1918 and later, rector of the National Cathedral 1922-1926, interred with his wife Anna Embury Russell
- William Levering DeVries († 1937), Canon and Precantor of the Cathedral.
- Frederick Ward Denys († 1941), clergyman and benefactor to the Cathedral, helping to build the baptistry and deanery.
- ZeBarney Thorne Phillips († 1942), Chaplain of the Senate (1927–1942)
- Franklin Johns Bohanan († 1953), Canon of the cathedral and rector of Rock Creek Parish.
- Robert Stockton Trenbath († 1956), rector of St. Alban's Church
- John W. Suter († 1977), 5th Dean of the Cathedral (1944-1950) and 6th Custodian of the Standard Book of Common Prayer of the United States (1942-1963)
- Merritt F. Williams († 1977), Missionary to Alaska
- Francis Bowes Sayre Jr. († 2008, ashes), 6th dean of the cathedral and grandson of President Woodrow Wilson

== Schools ==
There are three private Episcopal schools on the grounds of Washington National Cathedral.

- Beauvoir School, a co-ed school serving preschool through 3rd grade
- St. Albans School, an all-boys school serving grades four through twelve
- National Cathedral School, an all-girls school serving grades four through twelve

== In popular culture ==
The cathedral played a major role in The West Wing season 2 finale "Two Cathedrals". In a scene following the funeral of a major character, President Bartlet engages in a one-sided argument with God which seamlessly blends English and Latin dialogue. The cathedral also makes appearances in the following movies: The Pelican Brief (1993), Lady-like (2017), and the short documentary The Stone Carvers (1984), which describes the construction of the cathedral.

== See also ==
- List of the Episcopal cathedrals of the United States
- List of cathedrals in the United States
- List of burial places of presidents and vice presidents of the United States
- All Hallows Guild Carousel
- Washington National Cathedral Police
- Basilica of the National Shrine of the Immaculate Conception
- Church Center for the United Nations
- Architecture of Washington, D.C.
- The Philadelphia Eleven: The first Episcopal female priests in the USA

== Bibliography ==
- Marjorie Hunt, The Stone Carvers: Master Craftsmen of Washington National Cathedral (Smithsonian, 1999).
- David Hein, Noble Powell and the Episcopal Establishment in the Twentieth Century. Foreword by Peter W. Williams. Urbana: Univ. of Illinois Press, 2001; Eugene, Ore.: Wipf & Stock, 2007. Includes a chapter on Powell when he was dean of WNC and warden of the College of Preachers.
- Step by Step and Stone by Stone: The History of the Washington National Cathedral (WNC, 1990).
- A Guide to the Washington Cathedral (National Cathedral Association, 1945).
- Peter W. Williams, Houses of God: Region, Religion, and Architecture in the United States (Urbana: University of Illinois Press, 1997).
- Cathedral Age (magazine).
