= Metropolitan Community Church of Washington, D.C. =

Coordinates: 38°54′22.7″N 77°1′7.4″W

- MCCDC
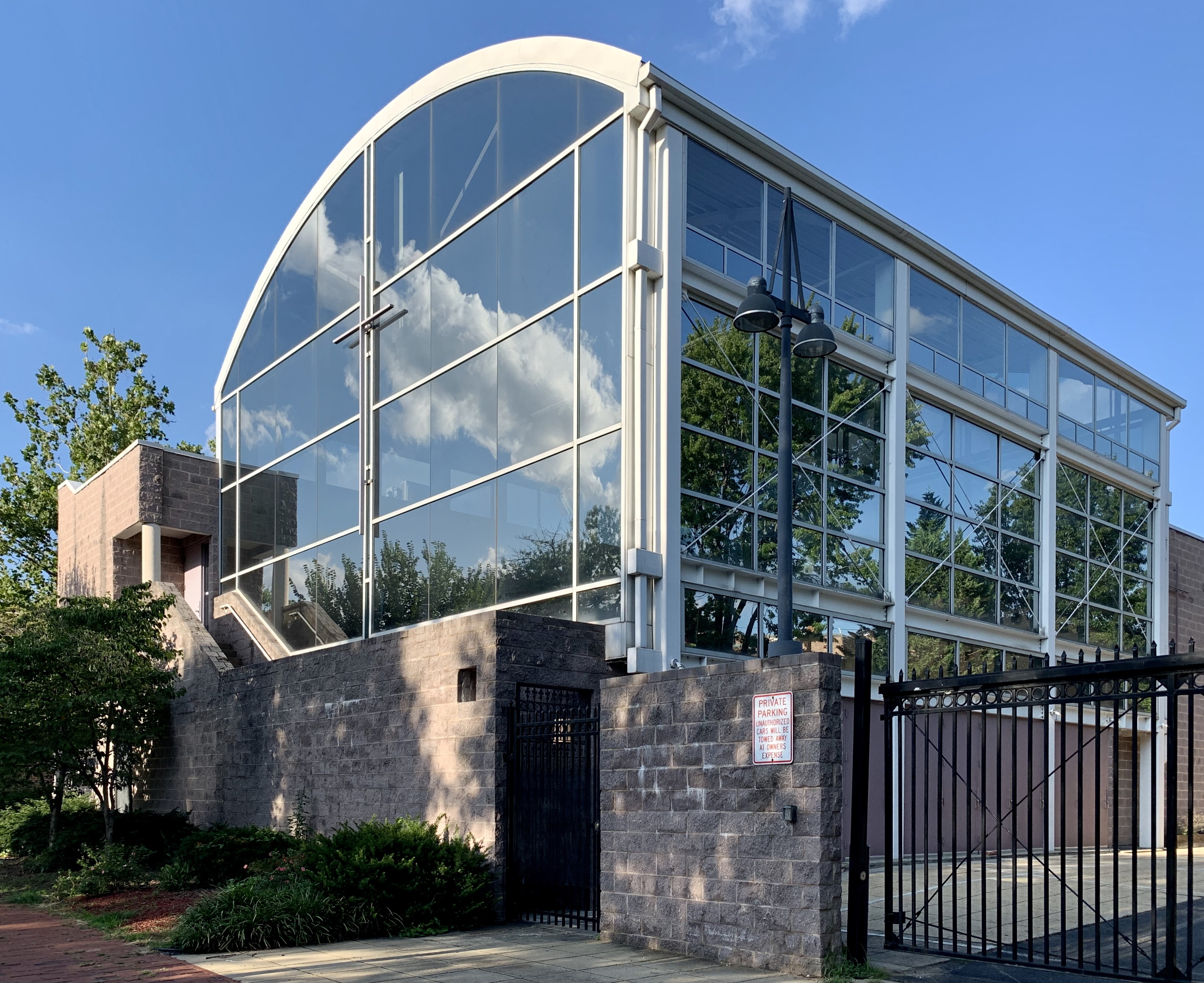
- MCCDC sanctuary in 2020
- Metropolitan Community Church of Washington, D.C.
- Location: 474 Ridge Street NW Washington, D.C.
- Denomination: Metropolitan Community Church
- Website: mccdc.com

History
- Founded: 1970
- Founder: Joseph Eugene Paul Breton
- Dedicated: December 17, 1992

Architecture
- Architect: Suzane Reatig
- Style: Modern

Clergy
- Pastor: Dwayne Johnson

The Metropolitan Community Church of Washington, D.C. (also known as MCCDC) is a congregation of the Metropolitan Community Church (MCC), a Protestant Christian denomination catering to LGBTQ people, located in the Mount Vernon Square neighborhood of Washington, D.C. Founded in 1970 as the Community Church of Washington, D.C. (CCDC), the congregation led by Pastor Paul Breton joined the new MCC denomination in 1971 with help from local activist Frank Kameny.

The original members founded MCCDC because, at the time, most churches did not welcome LGBT people. They wanted a safe space to gather, not only as LGBT people but also as LGBT Christians. The church experienced significant growth during its first 30 years, from around 65 people at its initial meeting to over 500 members in the early 2000s, despite the effects the AIDS epidemic had on the congregation. Since MCCDC's founding, several other Christian denominations have changed their views on homosexuality and now welcome LGBT people. These changes have resulted in a decline in people attending MCCDC.

MCCDC spent over 20 years meeting in its founder's home, other church buildings, and a converted rowhouse, before moving to a new and permanent facility in 1992. This facility became the first new sanctuary built in the US by an LGBT religious organization. Designed by local architect Suzane Reatig, the small but imposing building, with its vaulted glass sanctuary, has received praise from critics and earned Reatig several awards.

== History ==
=== Early years ===
In January 1970, a group of LGBTQ people in Washington, D.C. formed the Homophile Social League (HSL). This club held social events and educational seminars for the local community. It advocated for LGBT rights in the United States. HSL president Paul Breton, a former seminarian in the Roman Catholic Archdiocese of Hartford, Connecticut who was active in the Gay Liberation Front and a founding member of the Gay Activist Alliance, served as league president.

Later that year, as part of their attempt to have local churches welcome LGBT people, league members planned an ecumenical service at All Souls Unitarian Church. It was the first step in starting a local congregation of the Metropolitan Community Church, a Protestant Christian denomination catering to LGBT people that was founded in 1968 by Troy Perry. Breton was introduced to Perry by a mutual friend, co-founder of the local Mattachine Society and LGBT rights activist Frank Kameny, and sought advice on forming a local church chapter.

In response to why league members wanted to hold a service, Breton stated: "What I hope will happen is that churches throughout the city will invite us to attend regular services, and that eventually churches will be able to accept homosexuals on a fully active basis. However, the experience of homosexuals in other cities leads us to believe we cannot be accepted. Because of the recalcitrance of church members toward homosexuals, segregated homosexual churches have been set up."

Around 60 men and 5 women attended the service held on September 27, in what was billed as "Washington's first worship service for homosexuals." The attendees prayed, sang hymns from a Unitarian Universalist book, partook in communion, and listened to speakers, two of whom were a Roman Catholic priest and a former Methodist minister. In the opening prayer Martha A. Taylor of Arlington, Virginia, said, "Each of us has come here for his own reasons" and "You, oh God, know, we are no better and no worse than [others] because of our sexual orientation...It is the qualities exemplified through day-to-day living that determine the worth of each man."

The congregation, originally named the Community Church of Washington, D.C. (CCDC), continued meeting at All Souls. However, when the congregation needed a larger space for a February 1971 event attended by Perry that included a wedding ceremony for two members, the congregation planned the event to be held at St. Stephen and the Incarnation Episcopal Church. When William Creighton, bishop of the Episcopal Diocese of Washington, learned of the ceremony, he told CCDC that it could not meet at the Episcopal church. The congregation instead held their service outside of St. Stephen. During his speech, Perry said, "Even though [Bishop Creighton] has locked us out of this church, God hasn't locked us out of His heart."

In March 1971, Breton was ordained at All Souls by a Roman Catholic priest and three Methodist ministers. Breton called his ordination "a public ratification of a commitment in grace and conscience already made." CCDC was chartered on May 11, 1971, as the Metropolitan Community Church of Washington, D.C. (MCCDC), by the Universal Fellowship of Metropolitan Community Churches. The congregation moved to Breton's Capitol Hill house at 705 7th Street SE, but there was limited space to meet. This did not stop the congregation from worshiping, though, and Breton's house was also where other wedding and commitment ceremonies took place.

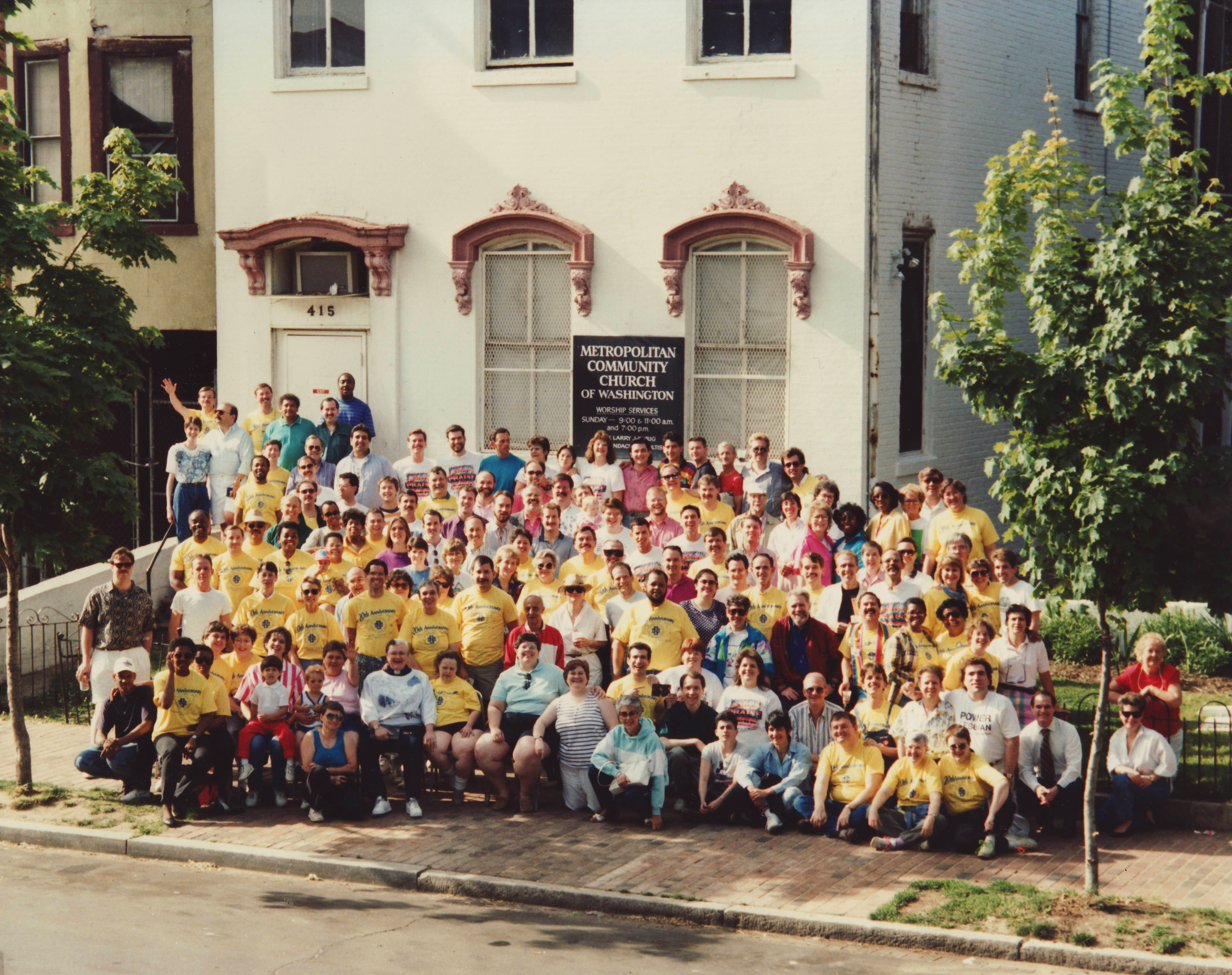
MCCDC held services at 415 M Street NW from 1984 to 1992.

In late 1972 the congregation needed more space and began meeting at an abandoned church in Capitol Hill. Breton continued serving as pastor until his resignation in 1973 to start additional MCC congregations in Baltimore, Phoenix, and Los Angeles. A few months after resigning, Breton played a large role in assisting Perry and other MCC pastors with helping survivors of the UpStairs Lounge arson attack in New Orleans.

=== Church growth ===
The congregation continued to grow in the 1970s, and following Breton's resignation was led by John Barbone, a former Roman Catholic priest and vice-principal of Mackin High School (later merged into Archbishop Carroll High School). To accommodate its growth, in 1973, MCCDC began holding services at First Congregational United Church of Christ's (FCUCC) chapel and later its sanctuary, though it was temporarily evicted from the facility after a vote by conservative FCUCC members. The dispute was settled in 1975 and MCCDC, which had around 120 members at the time, signed a lease to continue meeting at FCUCC.

That same year MCCDC helped establish the Jewish egalitarian worshiping community Bet Mishpachah, joined the Council of Churches of Greater Washington (local chapter of the National Council of Churches), and Barbone resigned to start an MCC congregation in San Francisco. MCCDC continued holding services at FCUCC until 1984. During this time, the church was led by two other pastors, Jack Isbell followed by Larry J. Uhrig, a former Methodist minister who would lead MCCDC for 16 years.

In 1984 MCCDC purchased its first meeting space, a rowhouse located at 415 M Street NW in the Mount Vernon Square neighborhood. Built in 1866, the house previously served as the Shomrei Shabbos Orthodox Synagogue, Young Mens Hebrew Association (precursor to the Jewish Community Center), and Hebrew Home for the Aged.

=== AIDS epidemic ===
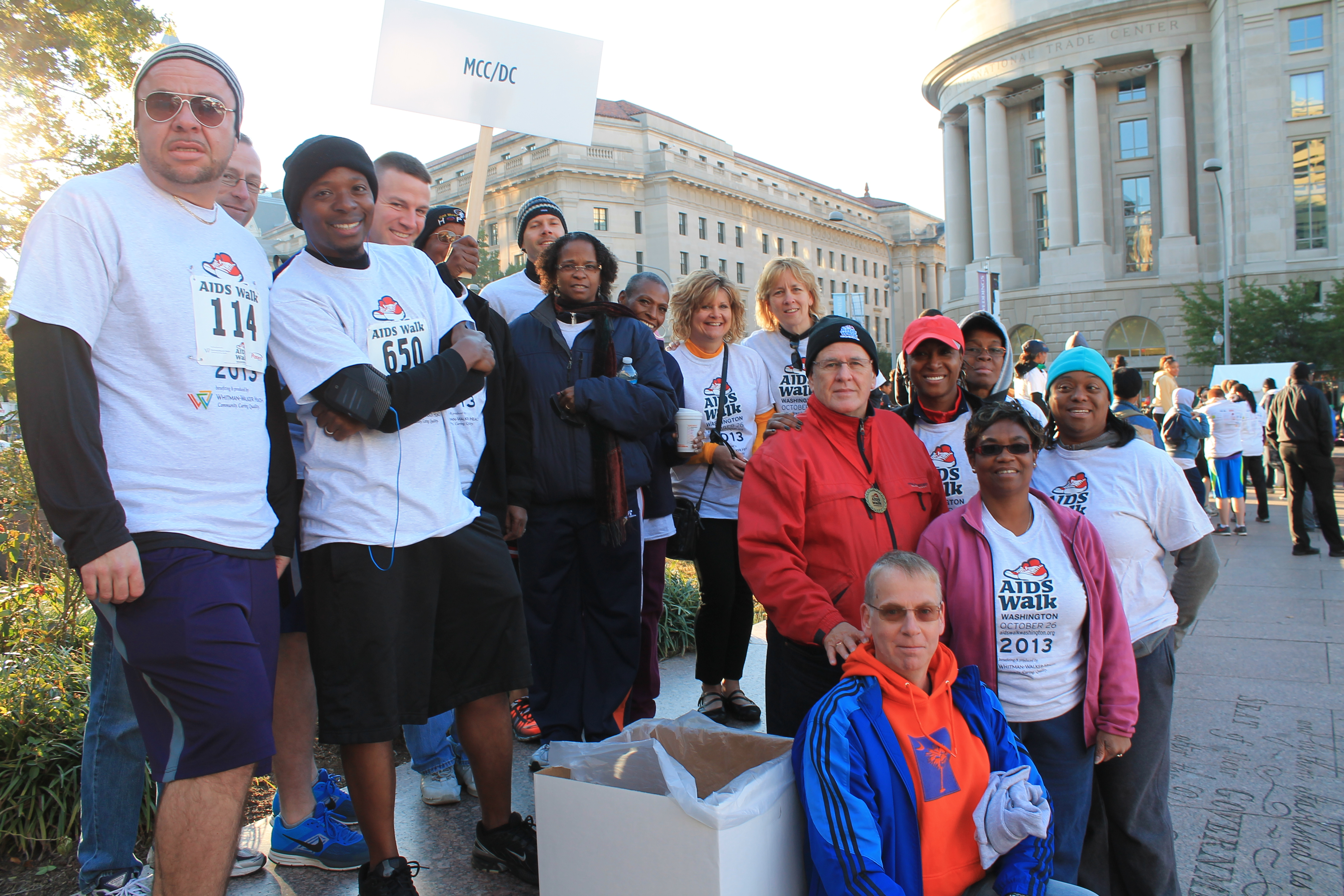
MCCDC volunteers at an AIDS Walk.

When the AIDS epidemic began in the early 1980s, and large numbers of gay men began dying, MCCDC was one of the first local organizations that spoke out about the new disease and the dangers it brought to the gay community. On December 9, 1982, MCCDC hosted the area's first community AIDS forum, attended by around 200 people. At the event, Uhrig spoke about not only the physical effects of the disease but also the psychological effects: "I'm concerned that deep levels of internalized self-oppression have allowed us to accept social judgment against us."

The forum would be the first of many events MCCDC held to educate people about the disease. One such event, held in 1983 and co-sponsored with the DC Coalition of Black Gays, focused on the impact AIDS had on minorities and was hosted at the Clubhouse, a gay bar catering to the local black LGBT population. These types of events were also an attempt to attract people of color to attend MCCDC, which was overwhelmingly white at the time.

Because many churches and most funeral homes were unwilling to host funerals for people with AIDS, many of the services were held at MCCDC. A lot of these victims were either impoverished or had very little money after losing their jobs. Because of this, the church changed its funeral policy and offered to host their funeral services for free. Candace Shultis, who served as an associate pastor at MCCDC in the 1980s, stated: "So we did a lot of funerals, not just for our own people but for other people whose churches wouldn't conduct the funerals. There was only one funeral home in town at the time that was willing to even do an AIDS funeral...One of the reasons why I think there are so many women clergy in MCC is because the men died, so many of the men died, so the leadership began to be female because we were the ones that were surviving."

On the tenth anniversary of health officials announcing their first report on AIDS and after 3,000 area residents had died from the disease, Uhrig, along with other faith leaders and government officials including Surgeon General Antonia Novello and National Institute of Allergy and Infectious Diseases director Anthony Fauci, gathered for a memorial service marking the somber event. Uhrig had been living with AIDS for many years and, at the event, stated: "I didn't come to think about 10 years of dying. I came to celebrate a decade of survival."

=== New sanctuary ===
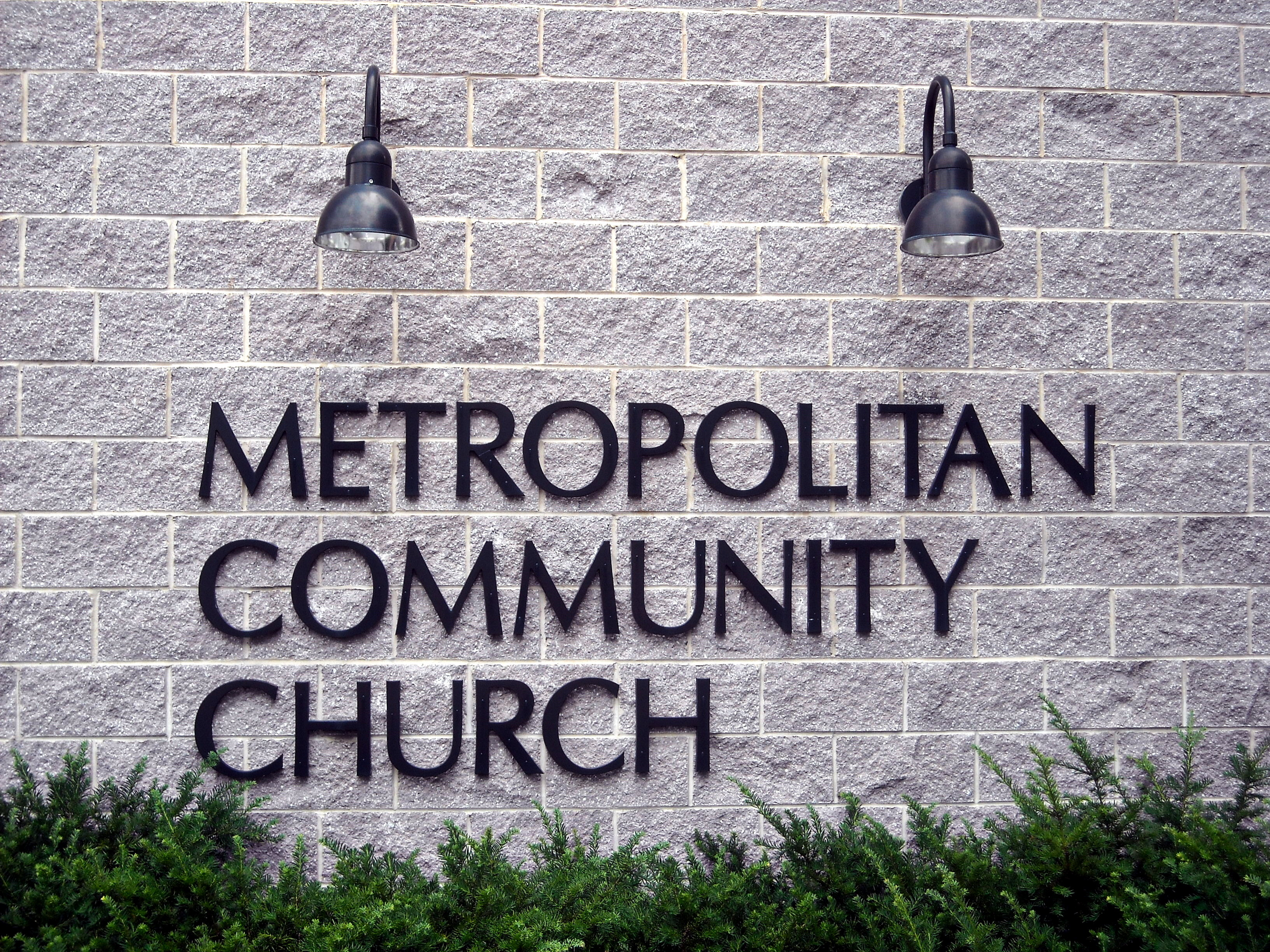
MCCDC sign

Because of overcrowding, there were three services held each Sunday at the M Street rowhouse. Attendees often had to stand, sit upstairs, or gather in the doorway. In the late 1980s, MCCDC started a building fund to construct a new and permanent facility. By mid-1990, members had raised $235,000 and purchased land on the corner of 5th and Ridge Streets NW, a block from their M Street location. On July 21, 1990, a groundbreaking ceremony and picnic were held, attended by hundreds of people, including Perry. Construction did not begin until the following year after the church raised additional funds.

The congregation moved into the $1.2 million church in late 1992. The new facility became the first sanctuary built in the US by an LGBT religious organization. Uhrig described the church as a "message to the rest of our community, to have a vision for the future and to believe. The new church...illustrates the growth of the gay religious community. It is a change in mentality." At that time, the church had over 400 people attending Sunday morning services, 30% of whom were people of color. The transition from being a congregation composed of mostly white gay men to a more ethnically diverse one was a result of a discussion Shultis had with Uhrig: "You have got to pay more attention to women, more attention to people of color, the music had to change, the attitudes had to change...it took a lot of time to change the ratios, but I think he really listened. Things began to change after that."

The two-story, 300-seat church, featuring a vaulted ceiling as well as glass and masonry walls, was designed in the modernist style by Maryland architect Suzane Reatig. A columbarium for urns was built into the small chapel on the second floor and its design reflected the continued high number of deaths at the time due to AIDS. The striking design was praised in reviews by Benjamin Forgey, architecture critic for The Washington Post and Herbert Muschamp, architecture critic for The New York Times.

The new building was dedicated in March 1993. Nine months later, Uhrig preached his last sermon on Christmas Eve, three days before his death due to complications from AIDS. In regards to Uhrig's many years leading MCCDC, Perry said, "[Uhrig] worked so hard to get that church built before he died."

=== Later history ===
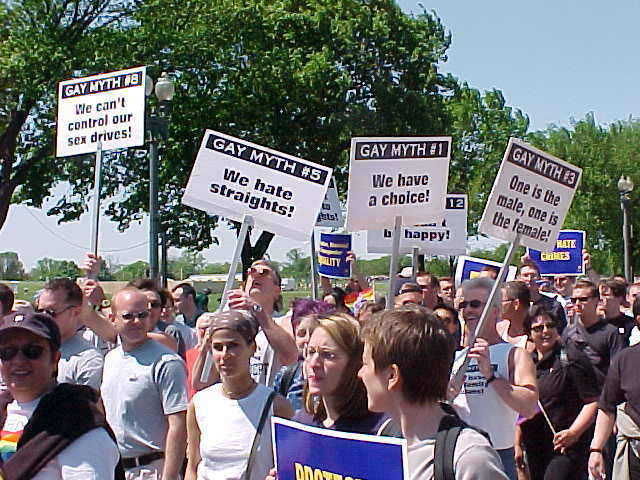
MCCDC helped organize the Millennium March on Washington.

After Uhrig's death, Shultis was the next to lead MCCDC as senior pastor. A former Methodist minister, she had joined the church in 1980. Despite the enormous loss of life in the local LGBT community, MCCDC continued to grow in the 1990s and by 1996 there were almost 500 members. The church continued its outreach to people of color with assistant pastor Belva Boone (later the pastor of St. John's Metropolitan Community Church) taking part in discussions with area ministers on the topic of homophobia in black churches.

MCCDC, along with other congregations in the MCC denomination, and the Human Rights Campaign (HRC) organized the Millennium March on Washington, an LGBT rights rally that took place in April 2000 and was attended by hundreds of thousands of people. The march was criticized not only by conservatives, but by many LGBT activists and liberal groups, for the lack of diversity, corporate sponsorship, and ill-defined political platform.

The Rainbow History Project, a local organization founded in 2000 that documents Washington, D.C. LGBT history, added Breton's Capitol Hill rowhouse, where MCCDC met in the 1970s, to its list of local historic LGBT sites. In 2007, Shultis resigned from MCCDC to pastor a church in Florida and the congregation was led by Charlie Arehart for the next two years.

MCCDC continued to advocate for LGBT acceptance and rights during the 2000s, from speaking out on homophobia preached in local churches to celebrate the passage of Washington, D.C.'s same-sex marriage legislation in 2009. Dwayne Johnson, who was raised in the Church of the Nazarene denomination and became pastor at MCCDC in January 2010 after resigning from an MCC in Texas, officiated wedding ceremonies on the first-day marriage licenses were issued to same-sex couples. By the end of 2010 Johnson had officiated 35 weddings and during the next few years 50-60 weddings were held at the church each year.

In 2011, Perry and MCCDC celebrated the church's 40th anniversary as an MCC congregation by hosting a "Fabulous and Faithful 40th Anniversary Event" at HRC headquarters. Shae Agee, who served as event committee chair, stated: "MCC in Washington is a pivotal place for LGBTQ people that have been thrown out of their church, who feel that being gay and Christian or trans and Christian cannot be done." The church's 45th-anniversary event was held at the National Press Club and at the time Johnson noted that Sunday service attendance had decreased from its high of 500 in the early 2000s to just over 200 by 2016. He explained this was partly the result of other denominations finally accepting LGBT people: "Part of our early mission was to change society, to transform the world and ourselves and MCC accomplished that on many levels. Yes, more churches are welcoming now, but that's not a loss for us. That speaks to the power of our message and the work we've done. We applaud other churches who make it possible for more people to find love and God, so all of that is good. But yes, it does make our job a different challenge."

== Building ==
=== Architect ===
The 300-seat MCCDC building is located at 474 Ridge Street NW in the predominantly residential Mount Vernon Square neighborhood. It was the first major solo project of local architect Suzane Reatig. Reatig emigrated from Israel in 1975 and attended the Technion – Israel Institute of Technology. The MCCDC building was the first of over 20 buildings Reatig designed in the surrounding neighborhoods, several of which are real estate ventures by the United House of Prayer for All People. Similar to modernist architects including I. M. Pei and Ludwig Mies van der Rohe, Reatig's works have been described as "polarizing" due to her linear designs that incorporate large amounts of concrete and glass. For her MCCDCC design, she was inspired by the works of architects Robert Venturi and Louis Kahn.

=== Design ===
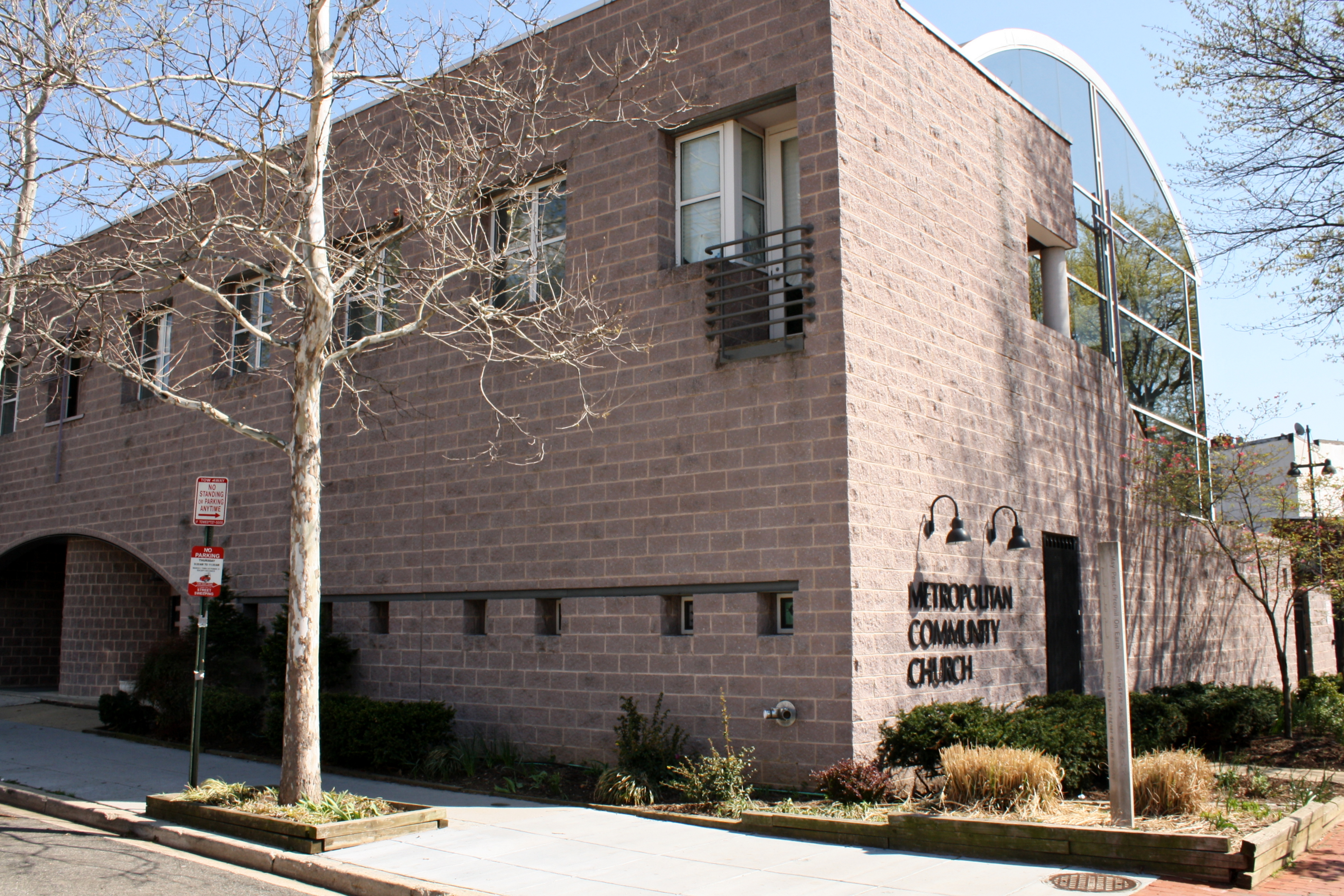
MCCDC as viewed from the corner of 5th and Riggs Street NW.

There were already four other design proposals for the new building before a mutual friend introduced Reatig to an MCCDC committee. Even though she had never designed a place of worship, Reatig's "unconventional ideas, chemistry, and enthusiasm" impressed committee members, and she was hired. Despite this, her design ran contrary to Uhrig's desire for a more conventional religious space with formal seating, stained glass windows, and dark interiors.

Local building regulations required a certain number of parking spaces (one space for every ten seats) based on the sanctuary's size. Nevertheless, Reatig noticed an exception: the parking requirement only applied to seats fastened to the floor. The seating design was altered, resulting in only 15 parking spaces being on the site instead of 30, which allowed for the building itself to be much larger. Engineering services for the building project were carried out by McMullan & Associates (structural), Setty & Associates (mechanical), and Macris, Hendricks PA (civil). Melinda Morrison was the consultant for lighting, and the Harvey Construction Company carried out construction work.

The two-story building is 13,400 square feet (1,245 sq m) and includes a basement, the maximum size that was allowed due to zoning regulations. It includes a two-story sanctuary with the rest of the space - chapel, library, offices, kitchen, and lounge area - in the remaining L-shaped portion of the building. The chapel's columbarium looks out over the sanctuary to "have deceased members of the congregation take part in services."

The building is cube-shaped and features a lightly pink concrete base beneath the vaulted glass sanctuary. The remaining portion of the building facing 5th Street, which includes an inclined wall and staircase, and the entire Ridge Street side of the building, minus the windows and doors, are also concrete. The Ridge Street arched entrance includes a large column. The masonry blocks are reminiscent of older buildings in the surrounding historic district.

The vaulted glass sanctuary faces south and west, providing a panorama of the sky and nearby trees. There is a cross on the exterior 5th Street side of the sanctuary. Four steel bowstring trusses support the vault. Depending on the amount of sunlight and time of day, the mirror glass panels make the interior seem larger. Shultis loved the idea of reflective glass, saying, "Especially being who we are, we recognized the sense of openness that glass would give was really important."

=== Reception ===
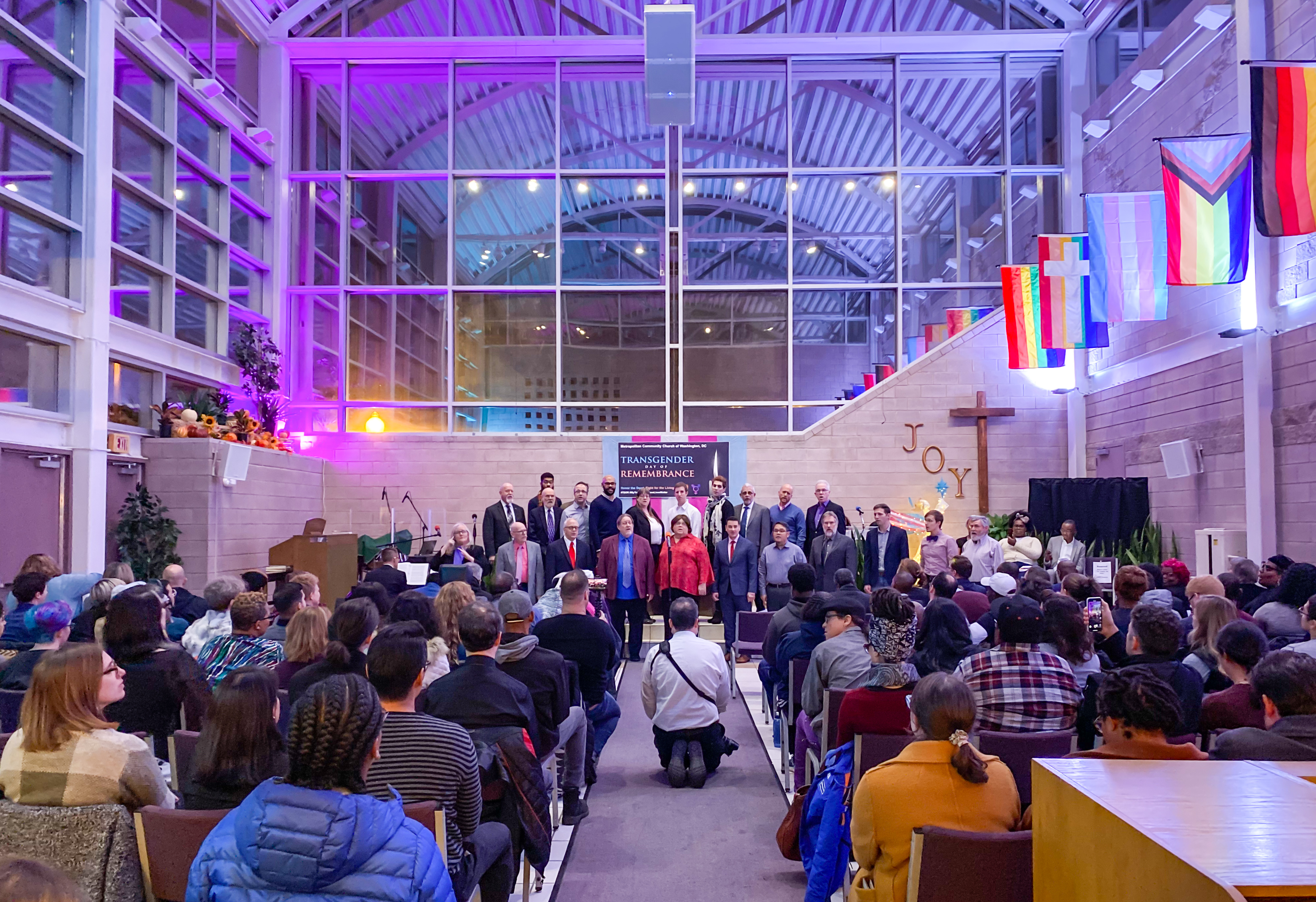
Church sanctuary during the 2019 Transgender Day of Remembrance.

Reatig's design has received praise from many critics. In an article reviewing the new building, Benjamin Forgey of The Washington Post said it "combines contextualism - the masonry blocks of two facades complement older houses nearby - with stunning pure form modern architecture" and describing the sanctuary as "bold and satisfying in the way that it opens up to trees and sky, it gains an ethereal extra dimension at dusk and nighttime." In another review Herbert Muschamp of The New York Times said the building "ushers its congregation and guests into a realm of literal and metaphoric transparency: a place where space, structure, and function have been rendered into lucid, accessible form" and drew similarities to Maya Lin's minimalist design of the Vietnam Veterans Memorial

Scholar Sigurd Bergmann described the design as "genius" and "while some urban churches choose to be fortresses within the city, this glassy church refuses to shut out its urban neighborhood, or to be shut from it." Architecture and urban planning journalist Amanda Kolson Hurley said it was her favorite building designed by Reitag and that "Reatig has made modernism an integral part of a residential D.C. neighborhood for the first time since I.M. Pei came to Southwest [Washington, D.C.] in the 1960s." USA Today included MCCDC on its list of "25 must-see buildings in Washington, D.C."

For her work on MCCDC, Reatig received several awards. She was the recipient of a 1993 DC Merit Award in Architecture from the local chapter of the American Institute of Architects (AIA) and a Concrete Masonry Award from the AIA the following year. Reatig was also recognized with the 1993 Excellence in Religious Architecture award by the Interfaith Forum on Religion, Art and Architecture, and the 1993 Masonry Design award by the National Concrete Masonry Association.

== See also ==
- Christianity and homosexuality
- List of Christian denominations affirming LGBT
- Progressive Christianity
- Queer theology
