= Freda Smith =

Freda Smith may refer to:

- Freda Smith (clergy), American minister and political activist
- Freda Love Smith, American musician, journalist and author
- Freda Pemberton Smith (1902–1991), Canadian landscapist and portraitist
