= NCMA =

NCMA may refer to:

== Organizations ==
- National Certified Medical Assistant
- National Concrete Masonry Association
- National Contract Management Association
- North Carolina Museum of Art
- Professional Association for Childcare and Early Years (formerly known as National Childminding Association)
