= Edith Perry =

Edith Perry may refer to:

- Edith Allen Perry (1916–1989), American activist for LGBT rights
- Edith Weir Perry (1875–1955), American miniature painter and author
