= Chris Glaser =

Chris Glaser may refer to:

- Chris Glaser (activist), LGBT activist
- Chris Glaser (American football) (born 1999), American football player
