= Edith Allen Perry =

American activist

- Born: September 11, 1916; Jasper, Florida
- Died: May 17, 1989 (aged 72); Los Angeles, California
- Occupation: Activist
- Children: 5, including Troy Perry

Edith Allen Perry (September 11, 1916 – May 17, 1989), also known as Mom Perry, was an American activist for LGBT rights, and mother of Troy Perry, founder and moderator of the Universal Fellowship of Metropolitan Community Churches.

== Early life ==
Edith Allen was born in Jasper, Florida, the daughter of William T. Allen and Georgia W. Driggers Allen.

== Activism and honors ==
Perry helped her eldest son Troy Perry when he launched the Metropolitan Community Church in Los Angeles in 1968 as a welcoming religious community for LGBT people. "All I know and need to know is that Troy is my son and I love him", she told a Los Angeles newspaper in 1970. In 1969, she co-founded a parents' organization with another mother, Vi Anderson. Perry appeared with her son and his partner in parades and rallies through the 1970s and 1980s, including the first Pride Parade, in Los Angeles in 1970. She appeared on the "Human Rights Train" in 1977, the first gay rights organization float to appear in the Hollywood Santa Claus Lane Parade. In 1980, she was named "Woman of the Year" by Christopher Street West, a Los Angeles gay pride organization. She wrote the foreword to her son's memoir, The Lord is my Shepherd and He Knows I'm Gay (1972). He dedicated a later memoir, Don't Be Afraid Anymore (1990) to her memory.

== Personal life and legacy ==
Edith Allen married at least four times. In 1940, she married Troy Perry Sr., a bootlegger, as her second husband; they had five sons together before he died in a car accident while being chased by police in 1952. She remarried a few months later, but soon divorced her third husband. She died from cancer in Los Angeles in 1989, aged 72 years. For her work, she was described by Chris Glaser as "a saint in the cause of lesbian and gay Christians."

The Edith Allen Perry Chapel at the Metropolitan Community Church's visitors' center in Los Angeles is named for her, as is the denomination's Edith Allen Perry Award, for parents or family members who are exemplary allies.

=== Edith Allen Perry Award ===
Recipients of the Edith Allen Perry Award have included Betty DeGeneres (1999), Marian Schoenwether and Barbara Chase Wilson (2007), the family of James Byrd (2010), Linda Brock of Canada (2005), Edafe Okporo, a refugee from Nigeria (2021), and Nan McGregor (2003) and Rev. June Norris (1997) of Australia.
