= MCCDC =

MCCDC may refer to:

- Marine Corps Combat Development Command, training facility at Marine Corps Base Quantico
- Metropolitan Community Church of Washington, D.C., LGBT church in Washington, D.C.
