= Freda Smith (clergy) =

Reverend Elder Freda Smith
- Born: Mary Alfreda Smith; November 22, 1935; Pocatello, Idaho, U.S.
- Died: December 3, 2019 (aged 84); Amador County, California, U.S.
- Education: CSU Sacramento
- Occupation: Pastor
- Years active: 1972–2005
- Religion: Protestant
- Church: Metropolitan Community Church
- Writings: The Story of the Purple Grass
- Website: revelderfredasmithmcc.com

Mary Alfreda Smith (November 22, 1935 – December 3, 2019) was an American political and LGBT activist, working in the areas of women's and minority rights. She worked on the Robert F. Kennedy election campaign in 1968, and helped overturn laws that criminalized homosexual activity in California. In 1972, she became the first ordained female minister of the Metropolitan Community Church.

== Early life and education ==
Smith was born on November 22, 1935, in Pocatello, Idaho. Her parents left Depression-era Oklahoma to settle in Idaho shortly before she was born. Mary was adept in math and science in school. Her parents, Alfred and Mary, moved the family along with their three children to a remote area, along with Alfred's grandmother who was the Nazarene preacher Lydia Harriet Smith, who had rescued Alfred from a Denver orphanage and raised him in the small churches she served at. Freda's early life revolved around the Nazarene Church. The area was primarily LDS at the time, with the Smiths being the sole exception. Besides minor differences in dogma (dancing, drinking coffee, etc.) both religions were against sin in any form, and for chastity, holiness, and a strong work ethic.

Freda attended church twice weekly, and home meetings involved hymns, Bible study, and prayer. Believers struggled against temptation and despair, and had joyful, optimistic renewals of faith and optimism in the sense of God's presence. This influenced Freda early, and she felt a calling to be a preacher, or a poet.

After the war years and the death of Smith's grandmother, the family began to drift from the Nazarenes. Shea left and became a member of the Salvation Army, whose fire and compassion for lost souls stirred her. Around this time, she recognized her lesbianism, and struggled against it, leaving Idaho to live with her uncle and aunt in Texas.

Smith left Texas to return to Pocatello to attend Idaho State College, majoring in speech and journalism. She was still praying for a cure, and felt a strong calling to preach, gaining practice in public speaking by joining the debate team in college. She finally realized she could not change her basic nature. Following a witch hunt against homosexuals in Boise in 1955–56, Smith left Idaho to find others like her, and ended up in California where she discovered a gay community.

Smith entered the California State University at Sacramento, majoring in English and psychology, graduating with a master's degree and became a licensed marriage and family therapist.

== Career ==
In California, Smith became a political activist and an activist for gay rights.

Using her passion about human rights, she joined the Bobby Kennedy Presidential election campaign in California in 1968. When he was assassinated, she decided to come out as a lesbian and a feminist and work to change laws in California. Coming out publicly was rare in those days before Stonewall; homosexuality was still against the law in California, was condemned by the Church, and considered to be a mental disease. She became co-chair of the California Committee for Sexual Law Reform and worked for the passage of Assemblyman Willie Brown's Assembly Bill 489 (Consenting Adult Sex Bill). She read her poem "Dear Dora/Dangerous Derek Diesel Dyke" to state legislators, including Lt. Gov. Mervyn M. Dymally who voted to break a tie in the California Senate and cause the bill to become law in 1975.

During her efforts to reform the law, Smith learned of the Metropolitan Community Church which had been founded by the Rev. Troy Perry in 1968. She felt her calling, and joined the church. In 1972, Smith became the first woman minister and first lesbian to be ordained by the Metropolitan Community Church. The next year, she convinced the denomination to change its bylaws to use pronouns "he and she". She was the first woman elected to the board of elders in 1973, at the fourth general conference in Atlanta, when the board was expanded from four members to seven.

In Denver in 1975, she co-performed with Robert Sirico the first U.S. same-sex wedding with a government-issued civil marriage license. Ultimately, the MCC became a leader in Christian social action, promoting women's equality including ordination of women clergy, inclusive language, and a theology of inclusion for everyone.

Smith served as senior pastor of MCC Sacramento from 1972 to 2005. In 2005, she retired and became director of the Reverend Elder Freda Smith Ministries, and to continue her writing to preserve the early history of LGBTQI Christians.

Smith died in 2019, at the age of 84, survived by her partner Kathleen Meadows, in Amador County, California.

== See also ==
- Queer theology
- LGBT-welcoming church programs
- Lesbian and Gay Christian Movement
- Christian denominations
