= Rembert S. Truluck =

American theologian and pastor (1934-2008)

Rembert S. Truluck (1934–2008) was an American gay theologian, Bible teacher, preacher, writer, and pastor who served in Metropolitan Community Churches (MCC) in Atlanta, San Francisco, and Nashville between 1988 and 1996. He was the author of Invitation To Freedom (1993) and Steps to Recovery from Bible Abuse (2000).

== Biography ==
Truluck was born in Clinton, South Carolina. He attended Furman University and earned a doctorate in Sacred Theology. He served from 1953 to 1973 as Southern Baptist preacher and was a professor at Baptist College at Charleston. After being outed to the college's Board of Trustees, he resigned and became a pastor of MCC.

He was also interviewed in the 1993 documentary One Nation Under God.

He was working on his next book Will The Real Jesus Please Stand Up? at the time of his death from natural causes on November 14, 2008, at age 74.

== Works ==
- Invitation to Freedom: Bible Studies in Personal Evangelism (Chi Rho Press, 1993; OCLC 29994309)
- Steps to Recovery from Bible Abuse (Chi Rho Press, 2000; OCLC 46366315)
