= New Pacific Academy =

1990 LGBT activist training in San Francisco, California

- Discipline: LGBT studies

Publication details
- History: Summer of 1990

New Pacific Academy (NPA) was an education and training program for young lesbian, gay, bisexual and transgender (LGBT) activists held in San Francisco, California, in the summer of 1990. 104 students aged 18 to 30 attended the month-long program.

NPA was a program of the Critical Literacy Institute, a non-profit organization founded by Luke Adams in 1989 to merge inquiry and action, and to sponsor young activist scholars, particularly those from marginalized populations. Cleve Jones, founder of the NAMES Project AIDS Memorial Quilt, co-founded NPA. Joe van Es-Ballesteros served as general manager, and Karyn Andrade served as program director.

The curriculum covered the nuts and bolts of activism, LGBT history, organizing skills, health issues, and diversity.

Adams and Jones saw the program as "basic training" for a new generation of LGBT activists, and as a way to address pressing issues including a rising incidence of HIV transmission among teens, a high suicide rate among LGBT youth, homophobia in school settings, and a "crisis of leadership" resulting from the loss of many movement leaders to AIDS.

The student body included 50% men and 50% women; approximately half were people of color. NPA recruited them by placing ads in LGBT newspapers throughout the U.S. They were chosen on the basis of their commitment to LGBT social service or activism, and were not charged for their participation in the program. The students came from 45 states in the U.S.

"I am going to do everything I can to get people my own age to get involved politically," NPA student Madrid San Angelo, 24, of Denver, told the Bay Area Reporter.

The students were housed in a dormitory at San Francisco State University, and classes were held at the Metropolitan Community Church in the Castro neighborhood.

The faculty included a diverse array of veteran LGBT activists. Guest speakers included Supervisor Harry Britt, folksinger Holly Near, and the former executive director of the National Gay and Lesbian Task Force, Virginia Apuzzo.

The students marched as a contingent in the San Francisco Gay and Lesbian Freedom Day Parade, and participated in various street actions including demonstrations and sit-ins. They organized a picket outside the offices of the San Francisco Chronicle newspaper to protest the publication of a column in which Herb Caen had written that "gays and lesbians do not have children, generally speaking."

NPA had a budget of $633,000, which was raised from corporations, foundations and individuals.

Though organizers intended NPA to be an ongoing, annual program, they were unable to raise the $7 million endowment they estimated would be required, and the program ended after its inaugural year.
