= Cecilia Eggleston =

English Metropolitan Community Church minister

The Reverend Cecilia Eggleston
- Occupations: Elder; pastor; moderator
- Years active: 1989–present
- Religion: Christianity (Mainline Protestant)
- Church: Metropolitan Community Church
- Ordained: 2004

Cecilia Eggleston is a minister and leader within the Metropolitan Community Church (MCC). She is currently the elected Moderator, CEO and chief spokesperson of MCC worldwide.

== Career ==
She helped create Samaritan Education in Europe and chaired its board of trustees for several years. Eggleston participated in the Board of Ordained Ministry before becoming district coordinator for MCC churches in the United Kingdom, France, Germany, and Denmark. Her experience as chair aided her work on the Elders Task Force on Education.

In 2003, Eggleston was elected to serve on the board of elders during a shift in the MCC's governance. She was ordained in 2004. In 2016, she became the moderator of the MCC; she is the second female moderator and the first to come from outside the United States. Eggleston retired from the Board of Elders in 2007 and became the full-time pastor of the MCC's Newcastle congregation. As part of the MCC's Strategic Review Team, Eggleston worked with the Board of Elders and Board of Administration to improve the MCC's denominational organization. As of 2025, Eggleston is the CEO and Chief of Staff of MCC worldwide.

== Views and activism ==
In 2007, Eggleston spoke at the United Kingdom's National Holocaust Memorial event. She has been involved in local efforts to combat homophobia on the International Day Against Homophobia. In response to the 2021 Atlanta spa shootings, Eggleston denounced anti-Asian racism resulting from the COVID-19 pandemic.

In 2023, Eggleston criticized the Church of England's decision to allow blessings of same-sex unions but continue defining marriage as between a man and a woman. She said this compromise "has gone on too long and has reached a new level of absurdity". Eggleston has criticized gun rights activist and US congresswoman Lauren Boebert's statement that Jesus should have been armed, saying that "if the congresswoman would give our scripture only a cursory glance, she would know that Jesus willingly gave His life, and wouldn't have fought back no matter how armed He was". Eggleston and the MCC have also opposed anti-LGBTQ+ laws in Florida and what the church refers to as Ron DeSantis's "extreme agenda".

== Personal life ==
Eggleston was the sixth of seven siblings. Raised Catholic, she came out as lesbian at thirteen years old and joined the MCC at approximately twenty years old.
