= St. John's Metropolitan Community Church =

Church in North Carolina, United States

Coordinates: 35.780280°N 78.6411645°W

Saint John's Metropolitan Community Church

Religion
- Affiliation: Metropolitan Community Church
- Status: Active

Location
- Location: 119 S Harrington Street; Raleigh, North Carolina; United States
- Interactive map of Saint John's Metropolitan Community Church

St. John's Metropolitan Community Church is a Christian church ministering to the LGBTQ population in Raleigh, North Carolina, United States. The church is a member congregation of the Metropolitan Community Church (MCC), a worldwide fellowship of LGBT-affirming churches. St. John's is also affiliated with the North Carolina Council of Churches and the Raleigh Religious Network for Lesbian and Gay Equality (RRNLGE). The church currently meets on Sundays in the 2nd floor Choir Room of The Church of the Good Shepherd (Raleigh, North Carolina).

St. John's was founded by Willie White and his partner Robert Pace in February 1976. In June of that year, members of St. John's voted to affiliate with the MCC denomination. The following year St. John's members began holding church services at the Community United Church of Christ and continued to use that facility for 17 years. In 1981 White became the faculty advisor for the Gay and Lesbian Christian Alliance (GLCA) at North Carolina State University, now part of the LGBT Services organization.

The second pastor of St. John's MCC was June Norris, the first heterosexual woman to be ordained by the MCC. Norris served the church from 1981 to 1988, participating in NC Pride and testifying before Raleigh City Council in regards to nondiscrimination clauses. The third pastor, Wayne Lindsey, led St. John's purchase of a church building on South Glenwood Avenue. During this time, the church became active with the RRNLGE and joined the North Carolina chapter of the Council of Churches. Lindsey, who pastored from 1988 to 2001, was an outspoken advocate for LGBT rights in North Carolina.

In July 2001, the church's fourth pastor Brendan Y. Boone became the second African American pastor of St. John's. The church is involved with local LGBT events, such as NC Pride, Gospel Drag, and AIDS awareness. Vance Haywood (Pastor Vance) became the church's fifth pastor in January 2018 and expanded their ministry focus by helping organize a white flag shelter for those who experience homelessness.

Paully Adams, M.Div., currently leads the church as Staff Pastor.

== See also ==
- LGBT-welcoming church programs
