= Nancy Wilson (religious leader) =

American religious leader (born 1950)

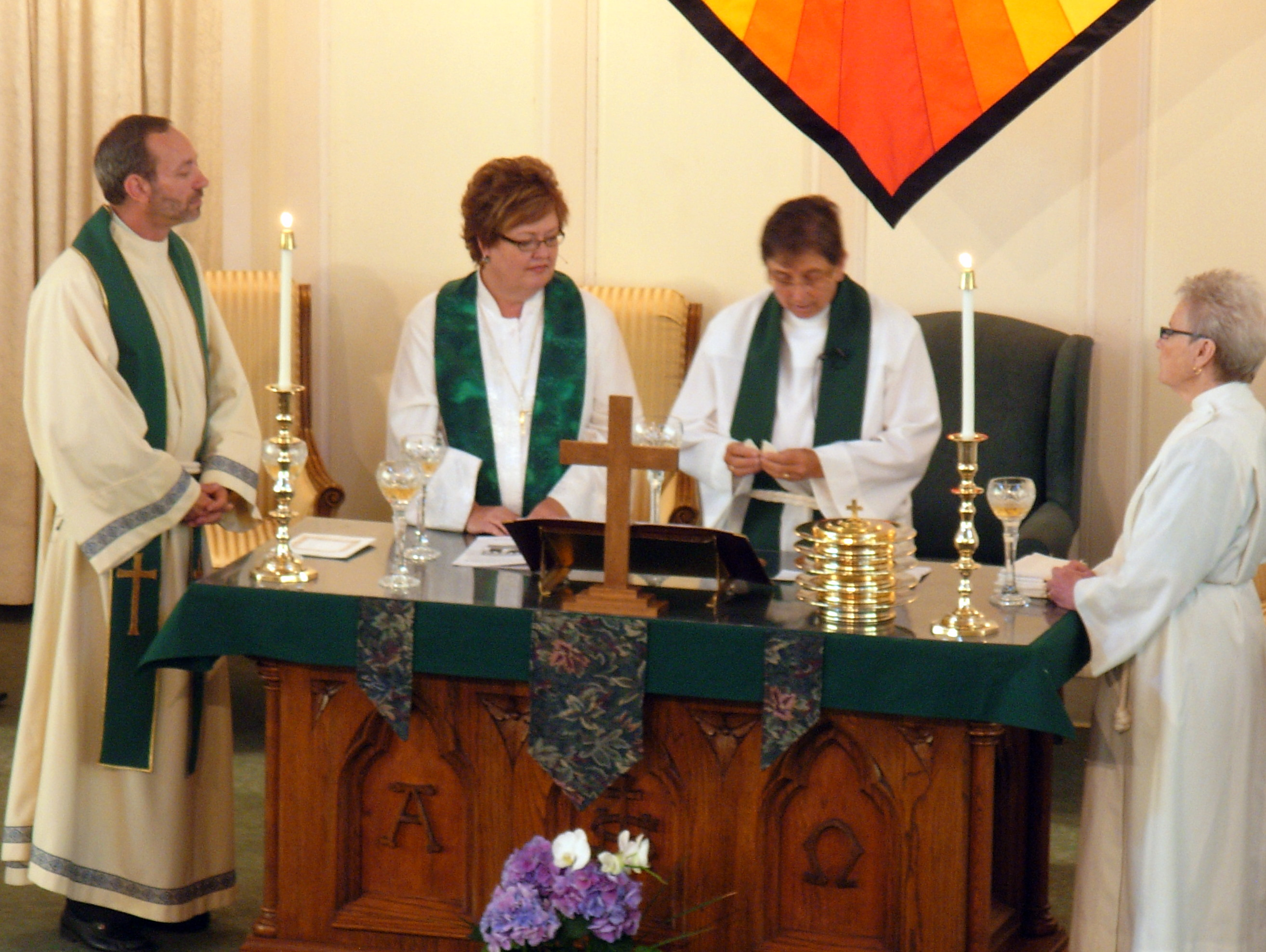
Wilson (second from right) celebrating the Eucharist in 2008

Nancy L. Wilson (born 1950) is an American cleric who served as the moderator of the Universal Fellowship of Metropolitan Community Churches. Under Wilson's leadership, the denomination became known as "The Human Rights Church" in many parts of the world for its commitment to same-sex marriage, employment and housing non-discrimination laws.

== Election ==
Wilson was elected moderator of the denomination of Metropolitan Community Churches (MCC) by the church's general conference in Calgary, Alberta, in July 2005. In accordance with the bylaws of the Metropolitan Community Churches, Wilson's name was placed in nomination by the denomination's Moderators Nominating Committee and her nomination was ratified with the overwhelming endorsement of the lay and clergy voting delegates to the 2005 MCC General Conference. Wilson was installed as moderator at the Washington National Cathedral in 2005, succeeding the denomination's founder, Troy Perry. Wilson retired from her position in October 2016, and was succeeded by an interim moderator, the Rev. Elder Rachelle Brown.

Under Wilson's leadership the denomination deepened its long-standing commitment to Christian social justice, becoming known as "The Human Rights Church" in many parts of the world for its human rights work in Eastern Europe, Jamaica, and Latin and South America and for its commitment to same-sex marriage, employment and housing non-discrimination laws, legal protections for persons with HIV/AIDS, and the full inclusion of lesbian, gay, bisexual and transgender persons within communities of faith.

Wilson is the second person, and the first woman, to serve as moderator of the Metropolitan Community Churches. The Metropolitan Community Church was founded in 1968.

== Biography ==
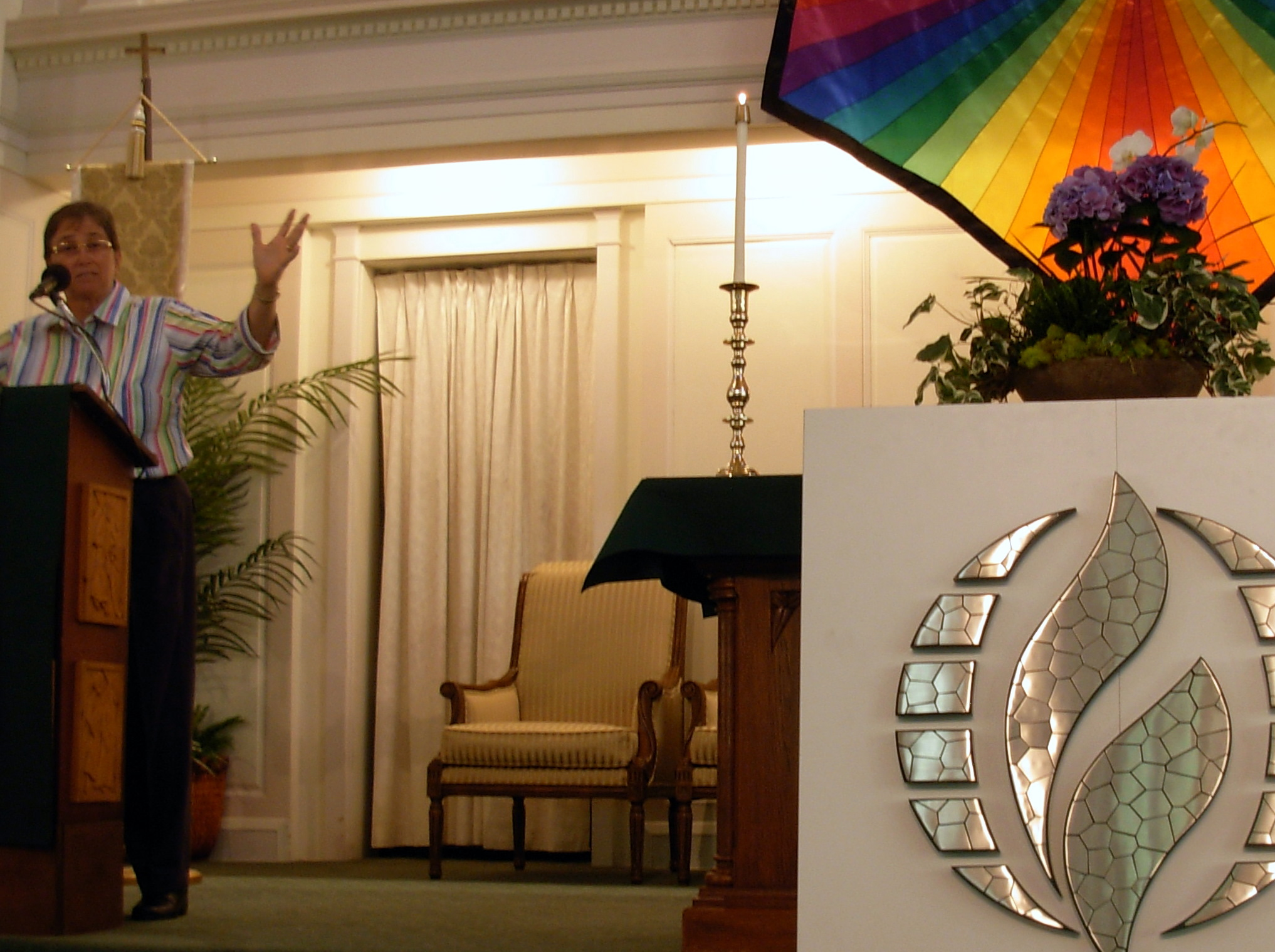
Wilson at an MCC conference in 2008

Wilson has a long record of service with the Metropolitan Community Church. She was the youngest person ever elected to the MCC Board of Elders in 1976 and served on the board of elders ever since except for a break between 2003 and 2005.

Wilson resides with her wife of 33 years, Paula Schoenwether. They both actively work for same-sex marriage equality, having married each other in Massachusetts. Wilson and Schoenwether were the plaintiffs in Wilson v. Ake, 354 F. Supp. 1298, in which they asked a Florida District Court to hold that the Defense of Marriage Act (DOMA) was unconstitutional. The court denied relief and held that DOMA was constitutional.

Wilson attended a Methodist church and Sunday school in her youth.

=== Education and experience ===
Wilson received her undergraduate degree from Allegheny College in 1972 before going on to study at Boston University School of Theology with a Rockefeller Fellowship. She also holds an M.Div. from SS. Cyril and Methodius Seminary in Detroit, served as Vice-Moderator of Metropolitan Community Church during 1993-2003 and has pastored Metropolitan Community Church congregations in Florida, Massachusetts, Michigan, and California. She is the former senior pastor of Metropolitan Community Church of Los Angeles, the founding church of the Metropolitan Community Churches international movement. She most recently served as senior pastor of Church of the Trinity MCC in Sarasota, Florida.

In 1976 she became the youngest person ever to be elected a member of the Metropolitan Community Church Board of Elders.

Local Church Pastoral Service: 2001–2005, Senior Pastor, Church of the Trinity MCC, Sarasota, Florida; 1986–2000, Senior Pastor, MCC Los Angeles, Mother Church of MCC; 1975–1979, Senior Pastor, MCC Detroit; 1974–1975, Senior Pastor, MCC Boston, Worcester, Massachusetts; 1972–1974, Associate Pastor, MCC Boston, Worcester, Massachusetts

=== Ecumenical and human rights work ===
Wilson has a deep commitment to ecumenical work and human rights. During 1979–1999, she served as MCC's Chief Ecumenical Officer, representing Metropolitan Community Church at the National Council of Churches and the World Council of Churches.

She has also been active on behalf of HIV issues, prisoner treatment programs, and women's rights. She is the founder of the MCC Conference for Women in Professional Ministry.

In 1979, she participated in the first-ever meeting of gay and lesbian religious leaders at the White House with President Jimmy Carter.

On April 6, 2010, she was guest of President Barack Obama at the White House Easter Prayer Breakfast.

On February 4, 2011, Wilson was appointed by President Obama to the President's Advisory Council on Faith-Based and Neighborhood Partnerships for a one-year term.

=== Public speaking ===
Wilson was the Guest Preacher at the Earl Lectures at Pacific School of Religion (Berkeley, California, January 2002) and has been a guest speaker at Harvard Divinity School, Vanderbilt Divinity School, Allegheny College, Claremont School of Theology, and the University of Southern California.

== Writings ==
Wilson is the author of:

- Our Tribe: Queer Folks, God, Jesus, and the Bible (1995 Harpercollins Press)
- Amazing Grace co-editor with Fr. Malcolm Boyd
- Contributing author to Poems and Prayers in Race and Prayer edited by Malcolm Boyd and Chester Talton (Morehouse Press).
- Contributing author to "The MisEducation Against Homosexuality In The Bible: "How The Church Got It Wrong!" (2010 New Points of View Publishing)
- "Outing the Church: 40 Years in the Queer Christian Movement" (2013 LifeJourney Press)
- "Outing the Bible: Queer Folks, God, Jesus, and the Christian Scriptures" (2013 LifeJourney Press)

Preceded by Troy Perry	Moderator of the Universal Fellowship of Metropolitan Community Churches. 2005–2016	Succeeded by Rachelle Brown (interim)
