= Flo Fleischman =

American LGBTQ+ activist

- Born: Florine Lenore Fleischman; January 17, 1930; Tampa, Florida, U.S.
- Died: June 5, 2018 (aged 88); North Hollywood, California, U.S.
- Occupations: LGBT rights activist, pastor
- Known for: President of the One Institute and Archives (1998–2000)

Florine Lenore "Flo" Fleischman (January 17, 1930 – June 5, 2018) was an American LGBTQ+ activist and ordained minister in the Metropolitan Community Church, based in the Los Angeles area. She was president of the One Institute and Archives from 1998 to 2000.

== Early life and education ==
Fleischman was born in Tampa, Florida, the daughter of Joseph Simon Fleischman and Alma Rockman Fleischman. Her parents were Jewish. Her oldest brother Sol was a sportscaster. She attended but did not graduate from the University of Tampa in the late 1940s. In 1979 she completed a bachelor's degree in theology at the Samaritan Theological Institute.

== Career ==
Fleischman and Betty Perdue, a schoolteacher, started hosting a gay women's group in 1963, at members' homes. In time their group became a chapter of the Daughters of Bilitis. Fleishman was an active member of the Southern California Council on Religion and the Homophile beginning in 1965. Fleischman joined the first Metropolitan Community Church in 1971, and worked as a counselor in the church's crisis intervention program. She became a licensed minister in the MCC, and was installed as pastor of Oceanside MCC in 1979. She left the denomination to form the New Hope Christian Church in Van Nuys, and led that church for about fifteen years. From 1994 to 2000, she was a board member and (from 1998) president of the One Institute and Archives.

== Publications ==
- "Lesbian Reflections on the Frightening Forties" (1996)
- "Lisa Ben" (2002, biographical profile, with Susan Bullough)

== Personal life ==
Fleischman's partner of 45 years died in 2016, and Fleishman died in 2018, at the age of 88, in North Hollywood.
