= Marge Ragona =

American religious leader (born 1929)

Marge Ragona (born Marjorie Ragona in 1929 in New York City) is a religious leader and LGBT rights activist.

== Biography ==
Ragona was a nurse who worked for many years at Mount Sinai Hospital in Manhattan, then moved to New Orleans in the 1960s to live with her partner; she became a teacher and Sunday school teacher, then left her Baptist congregation because she opposed segregation. Ragona studied at Tulane University, the Institute for Theology, and New York Theological Seminary and earned advanced degrees in theological studies. She is a lesbian and cites the homophobic discrimination of McCarthyism as a catalyst for her work in gay liberation and activism.

Ragona served as the pastor of the Metropolitan Community Church in Providence, Rhode Island. During the 1990s, Ragona was a pastor of the same church in Birmingham, Alabama. The church was founded as a Christian group that accepted homosexuality. She was a leader in the church throughout her career as a reverend. By 2015, Ragona had retired as a pastor.

Ragona was involved in the first teach-in and demonstration by gay activists at Harvard Law School in 1977. In May 1978, Ragona held an eight-day hunger strike to support the inclusion of sexuality in a Rhode Island anti-discrimination ordinance; the ordinance was passed without the clause. Ragona provided spiritual care and practical support those with AIDS in Alabama, at a time when those suffering from the disease were widely discriminated against. Throughout the 1990s, Ragona held services to honor the lives of those killed in homophobic attacks. In the early 2000s, Ragona was active in supporting gay rights for those in Africa, and Uganda in particular. Ragona officiated many weddings when gay marriage became legal in Alabama in 2015. Ragona continues to protest for LGTBQIA+ rights in 2023, at the age of ninety-four.

One of Ragona's most widely published work is the essay title "Women and the Bible" in Feminist Views of Christianity, which she co-edited with Jennie Bull in 1972. In the 1970s, Ragona described the image of God the Father as patriarchal and potentially divisive. She chooses to describe God as a more inclusive, less forbidding entity. Another work with Jennie Bull, De-Sexing Your Local Hymnal, deals with language and inclusivity in religious texts.

Ragona's archives are held at the Birmingham Public Library and have been used by scholars to map out the mid-twentieth-century gay and lesbian activist movement in the American South.
