= Freda Pemberton-Smith =

Canadian artist (1902-1991)

- Born: Frederick Augusta Pemberton-Smith; April 7, 1902; Montreal, PQ
- Died: February 8, 1991 (aged 88); Vankleek Hill, Ontario
- Education: École des Beaux-Arts de Montréal and later in London at the Slade School of Fine Art

Freda Pemberton-Smith (April 7, 1902 – February 8, 1991) was a Canadian landscapist and portraitist. Her work has been shown in exhibitions from British Columbia to Newfoundland and is found in private, public and corporate collections at home and abroad.

== Biography and career ==
Born on April 7, 1902, Freda Pemberton-Smith enjoyed a career that spanned eight decades of the 20th century. She studied at the École des Beaux-Arts de Montréal and later in London at the Slade School of Fine Art. One of her teachers was Edmond Dyonnet in Montreal with whom she studied for nine years, who also numbered Jack Bush and A.Y. Jackson among his students. Her family had reluctantly allowed her to pursued an art career on their understanding that she would earn a living at it. In the 1930s, however, the Depression put an end to a promising start in the field of commercial art and her work was further interrupted by the advent of World War II and service overseas with the Red Cross Volunteer Aid Detachment (VAD). After the war, Pemberton-Smith began painting again and also did some teaching, but like many women artists of the past century, found much of her time taken up with family obligations. It was only after her mother’s death in 1956 that she was able to devote herself fully to her art. She left Montreal in 1965 for the Ottawa Valley town of Vankleek Hill, where she soon became a familiar figure, painting outdoors in watercolour with her paper on the ground and her long-handled brush.

Pemberton-Smith was known for her expressionistic style and for her strong use of colour and her ability to convey effects of light, mood and movement. Her work has been shown in solo exhibitions at galleries, such as the Memorial University Gallery (St. John’s Newfoundland) (1964); Dresdnere and Kaspar Gallery (Toronto); Wallacks, Robertson Galleries and the Karsh-Masson Gallery (Ottawa); and Zwicker’s Gallery (Halifax), among others. She also participated in group shows held by the Canadian Society of Painters in Water Colour of which she was a member, the Montreal Museum of Fine Arts; the Tom Thomson Art Gallery; and the Pastel Society of America.

== Reviews ==
The Montreal Gazette, commenting on an exhibition held in Montreal in 1960, noted:

"The subjects for this well-known Montreal artist’s show… (are all) painted with observant and vigorous spontaneity…. Miss Pemberton-Smith is successful in her invigorating and expressive smaller sketches, hastily painted with passionate intensity…. A large palette knife portrait ("Old Newfoundland") [is] remarkable for its monumental and relaxed quality."

In 1962, according to Dorothy Pfeiffer of the Montreal Gazette: "Her best work could hang proudly in any gallery beside paintings of noted contemporary American, French or other Canadian artists. Freda Pemberton-Smith's art is immediately recognizable." Reviewing an exhibition at Wallacks in 1965, the Ottawa Journal stated: "This highly gifted artist…seems to possess equal facility with landscapes, seascapes, street scenes, occasional pieces and portraits…. This is altogether a first rate one-woman show." Discussing "Talent in Three Provinces" (Arts West Magazine, 1981), Marshall Webb refers to her palette: "as that of Cézanne: subtlety and warmth radiate through the reds, blues and greens.... [She] has created universals we all understand." The Ottawa Citizen, in an article on a retrospective held at Ottawa’s Karsh-Masson Gallery entitled "Freda Pemberton-Smith, a Centennial Celebration", described her work as "dynamic": "Her watercolours are vivid and full of movement…. Her pastels and pen-and-ink drawings are composed of bold, definite strokes…. Everywhere, there’s a feeling of pent-up energy and vigour."

Over the years, other articles on Pemberton-Smith have appeared in Le Droit; the Montreal Gazette; the Montreal Star; the Ottawa Citizen; the St. John’s Evening Telegram; Ottawa Life magazine; and the Westmount Examiner. Her work was discussed on CBC Radio, CJOH-TV’s Regional Contact, Rogers TV (then Rogers Cablevision), and Vision TV.
