= Chris Glaser (activist) =

American activist

Chris Glaser has been an activist in the movement for full inclusion of LGBTQ Christians in the Presbyterian Church (U.S.A.), or PCUSA, for over 30 years. He is currently a minister in the Metropolitan Community Church, or MCC.

== Education ==
Glaser graduated from Yale University Divinity School with a M.Div. degree in 1977. While still a student there in 1974, he formed a support group for gay Christians. In 1976, during an intern at University of Pennsylvania, he founded a peer counseling service for gay and lesbian people.

From 1976 to 1977, he served as the only openly gay man on the Presbyterian Task Force to Study Homosexuality, and the rejection of its gay tolerant conclusions by the Church meant that Glaser himself was refused ordination as clergy by the Presbyterian Church (USA) in 1978.

== Presbyterian ministry ==
After leaving Yale without his ordination, he created and served (from 1978 to 1987) as Director of Lazarus Project, a ministry of reconciliation between the church and the lesbian and gay community in Los Angeles, funded by the Presbyterian Church (USA). He also worked with as a national coordinator and editor for Presbyterians for Lesbian and Gay Concerns (now known as More Light Presbyterians) and their newsletter, More Light Update.

== MCC ministry ==
He began serving MCC San Francisco as Interim Pastor on November 1, 2006, having been ordained by this denomination. He has also served as Interim Pastor of Christ Covenant MCC in Decatur, Georgia.

== Interim Minister at Virginia-Highland Church (2009-2010) ==
Rev. Glaser served as interim pastor of Virginia-Highland Church in Atlanta, GA from January 1, 2009, until mid-2010.

== Writings ==
Glaser is a leading writer in the field of Queer Theology.

His published works include

- Uncommon Calling 1988
- Come Home! 1990
- Coming Out to God 1991
- The Word Is Out 1994
- Coming Out as Sacrament 1998
- Communion of Life-Meditations for the New Millennium 1999
- Reformation of the Heart: Seasonal Meditations by a Gay Christian With a Scripture Index 2001
- As My Own Soul: The Blessing of Same-Gender Marriage Seabury Press, 2009

Between 1998 and 2002, the year it ceased publication, Glaser edited Open Hands, a quarterly magazine for congregations welcoming of LGBT people in seven mainline Protestant denominations in the United States and Canada.

He has also published articles in such national publications as Christianity & Crisis, The Christian Century, and The Advocate, Newsweek.
