= National Concrete Masonry Association =

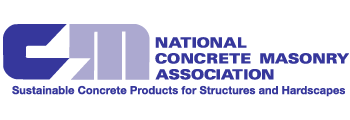
- Formation: 1918; 108 years ago
- Location: Herndon, Virginia, United States
- Products: Publications
- Services: Material testing, lobbying, conferences
- Members: 400 (2015)
- Chairman of the Board: Steve Berry
- President: Robert D. Thomas
- Revenue: $4,038,428 (2016)
- Expenses: $3,955,412 (2016)
- Staff: 23 (2016)
- Website: ncma.org

The National Concrete Masonry Association (NCMA) is a United States trade association of manufacturers of concrete and masonry products. The association was founded in 1918.

NCMA publishes methods and specifications, which are used by the industry, and are cited within professional manuals.

NCMA published a monthly magazine, Concrete Masonry Designs, from 2004 until 2010, when it became bi-monthly until 2012. The last edition of the magazine was published in 2015. Beginning in 2015, NCMA began publishing eNews on an almost weekly basis. NCMA holds an annual convention called ICON-Xchange.

NCMA offers certification programs and educational courses that are centered around the practical application of industry knowledge. These programs and courses are designed to address common issues that occur everyday in the field of Masonry.

NCMA operates an ISO/IEC 17025 accredited testing laboratory.

The association once worked with the United States Office of Civil Defense to create a video on how to build a family fallout shelter.
