= Troy Perry =

American activist and clergy

The Reverend Troy Perry
- Moderator
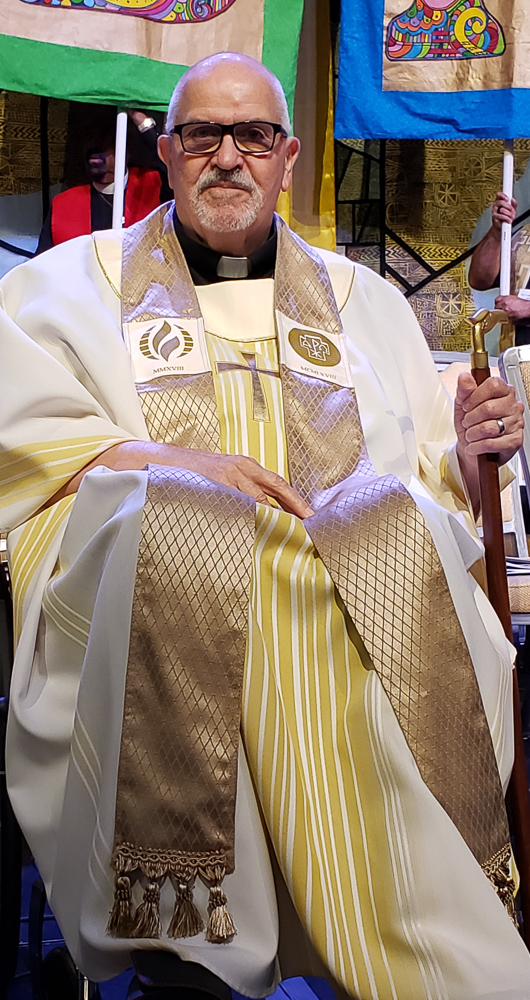
- Perry in 2019
- Church: Metropolitan Community Church
- Elected: 1968
- Term ended: 2005
- Successor: Nancy Wilson

Personal details
- Born: Troy Deroy Perry Jr; July 27, 1940 (age 86) Tallahassee, Florida, U.S.
- Parents: Edith Allen Perry
- Spouse: Pearl Pinion (wife 1959–1964, divorced); Phillip Ray De Blieck (husband since 2003)
- Children: 2 sons
- Occupation: Clergy

Troy Deroy Perry Jr. (born July 27, 1940) is an American cleric and minister who founded the Metropolitan Community Church, with a ministry for LGBTQ communities, in Los Angeles on October 6, 1968.

== Early life ==
Troy Perry is the eldest of five brothers born to "the biggest bootleggers in Northern Florida", Troy Perry and Edith Allen Perry. As early as he can remember, Perry felt called to preach, labeling himself as a "religious fanatic". He was influenced by his aunts, who held street services in his hometown and who hosted Perry giving sermons from their home. Perry's father died fleeing the police when his son was eleven years old. After his mother remarried and moved the family to Daytona Beach, Perry was raped by his stepfather and ran away from home, returning only after his divorce.

Perry dropped out of high school, and became a licensed Baptist preacher by the age of 15 years. A year later, he became a member of the Church of God (Cleveland). After Perry expressed his attraction towards males, his pastor suggested he marry a woman to resolve these feelings. He married this preacher's daughter, Pearl Pinion, in 1959, later remembering, "I was always interested in pastor's daughters because I thought they would make good preacher's wives. I didn't love her when I married her, but I did love her after our first year." They had two sons and relocated to Illinois where Perry attended Midwest Bible College and Moody Bible Institute where he studied for two years. Perry was the preacher at a small Church of God and sometimes had sexual relationships with other men but considered it youthful exploration. When he was 19 years old, church administrators told him one of the men had told them what they had done and he was forced to leave the church. They moved to Southern California, where he pastored a Pentecostal Church of God of Prophecy. After Perry's wife found his copy of The Homosexual in America by Donald Webster Cory, their marriage dissolved. They divorced after five years of marriage. Perry was directed to pray about being led astray by his homosexual feelings and later was told by his bishop to renounce himself in the pulpit and resign. Perry worked in a Sears department store and was drafted for the army in 1965, during which time he served two years in Germany.

== Founding the Metropolitan Community Church ==
In 1968, after a suicide attempt, and witnessing a close friend being arrested at The Patch Bar, Perry felt called to return to his faith and to offer a place for gay people to worship God. Perry put an advertisement in The Advocate announcing a worship service designed for gays in Los Angeles. Twelve people turned up on October 6, 1968, for the first service, and "Nine were my friends who came to console me and to laugh, and three came as a result of the ad." After six weeks of services in his living room, the congregation shifted to a women's club, an auditorium, a church, and finally a theater. In 1971, their own building was dedicated with over a thousand members in attendance.

In 1969, he celebrated the same-sex unions of two young men. In 1970, the first general conference brought together delegates from congregations in eight American cities. In 1972, he ordained women pastors. In 1973, he became moderator of the church.

Several MCC buildings have been targeted for arson, including the original Church in Los Angeles.

=== Smithsonian Institution archives ===
A collection of items from Perry and the Metropolitan Community Churches is held by the Smithsonian Institution's National Museum of American History. It was presented to the Smithsonian on the 51st anniversary of the founding of the church. It consists of personal items used by Perry in the founding of the Metropolitan Community Churches, historical Items from members and friends concerning Metropolitan Community Churches as well as Items that detail the work of the church and Perry in their struggle for equal and civil rights.

Other artifacts and records donated to the Museum include:

- The charter of MCC San Francisco describing the rights of membership;
- General Conference program books from the 25th, 40th, 50th years that provide information about MCC's development;
- An inclusive language hymnal from 1990;
- The original pamphlet "Homosexuality: Not a Sickness, Not a Sin" explained MCC's belief about sexuality and spirituality.
- An original copy of a 1971 issue of Life magazine with a photo of Perry marrying a couple at MCC Los Angeles;
- An original copy of the Service of Faith and Freedom to celebrate the 25th anniversary of Stonewall at Alice Tully Hall in New York City.
- A small cross made of stained glass from one of the destroyed windows of the Los Angeles church in an arson fire in 1973.

The bulk of MCC's historical records are preserved at the Center for LGBTQ & Gender Studies in Religion (CLGS) in Berkeley, California, and the ONE Institute in Los Angeles.

== Activism ==
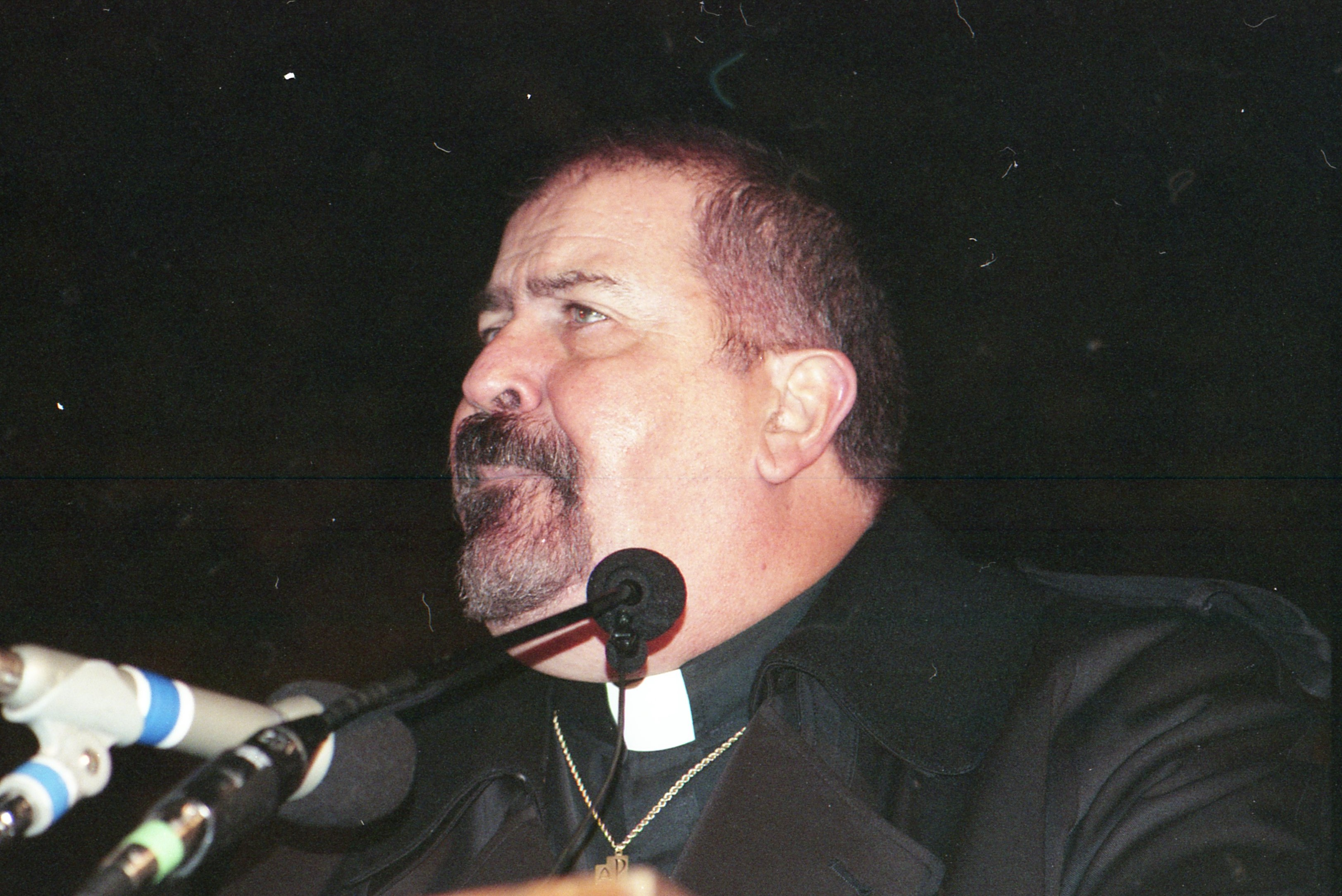
Perry in 1997

Perry held a seat on the Los Angeles County Commission on Human Relations in 1973. Perry worked in political arenas to oppose Anita Bryant in the Save the Children campaign in 1977, that sought to overturn an anti-discrimination ordinance passed by the city of Miami. Unsuccessful in Miami, he also worked to oppose the Briggs Initiative in California that was written to ensure gay and lesbian teachers would be fired or prohibited from working in California public schools. Beginning on September 4, 1977, Perry held a 16-day fast on the steps of the Federal Building in Los Angeles to raise funds to fight the initiative. The Briggs Initiative was defeated in 1978. Perry also planned the National March on Washington for Lesbian and Gay Rights in 1979 with Robin Tyler.

On June 28, 1970, Perry, with two friends, Morris Kight and Bob Humphries, founded Christopher Street West in Los Angeles to hold an annual Pride Parade. It is the oldest gay pride parade in the world.

In 1978, Perry was honored by the American Civil Liberties Union Lesbian and Gay Rights Chapter with its Humanitarian Award. He holds honorary doctorates from Episcopal Divinity School in Boston and Samaritan College (Los Angeles) for his work in civil rights, and was lauded by the Gay Press Association with its Humanitarian Award. Perry has been invited to the White House on five occasions:

- in 1977 by President Jimmy Carter to discuss gay and lesbian rights;
- in 1995 by President Bill Clinton as a participant in the first White House Conference on HIV and AIDS;
- in 1997 invited by President Clinton as a participant in the White House Conference on Hate Crimes;
- in 1997 again as a guest of President Clinton as an "honoree" at a White House breakfast with President honoring 100 national spiritual leaders in the USA.
- in 2009, along with his partner Phillip, by President Barack Obama on the occasion of the 40th anniversary of Stonewall.

On Valentine's Day 2004 he spoke to a crowd of gay newlyweds at the Marriage Equality Rally at the California State Capitol. He retired as Moderator of the MCC in 2005, and Nancy Wilson succeeded him at an installation service on 29 October 2005.

In March 2017, Perry became the first American citizen honored with Cuba's CENESEX award. Mariela Castro Espín, daughter of Cuban President Raul Castro, and a member of the country's National Assembly, and Director of CENESEX, presented the award. He was given the award for his long history of working for human rights and the rights of the LGBTQ community worldwide.

Perry was named to the Stonewall 50 Wall of Honor made up of 18 community leaders including Wilson Cruz, Mandy Carter, Marsha Botzer and Stuart Milk, the gay nephew of slain San Francisco supervisor Harvey Milk.

== Writings and media ==
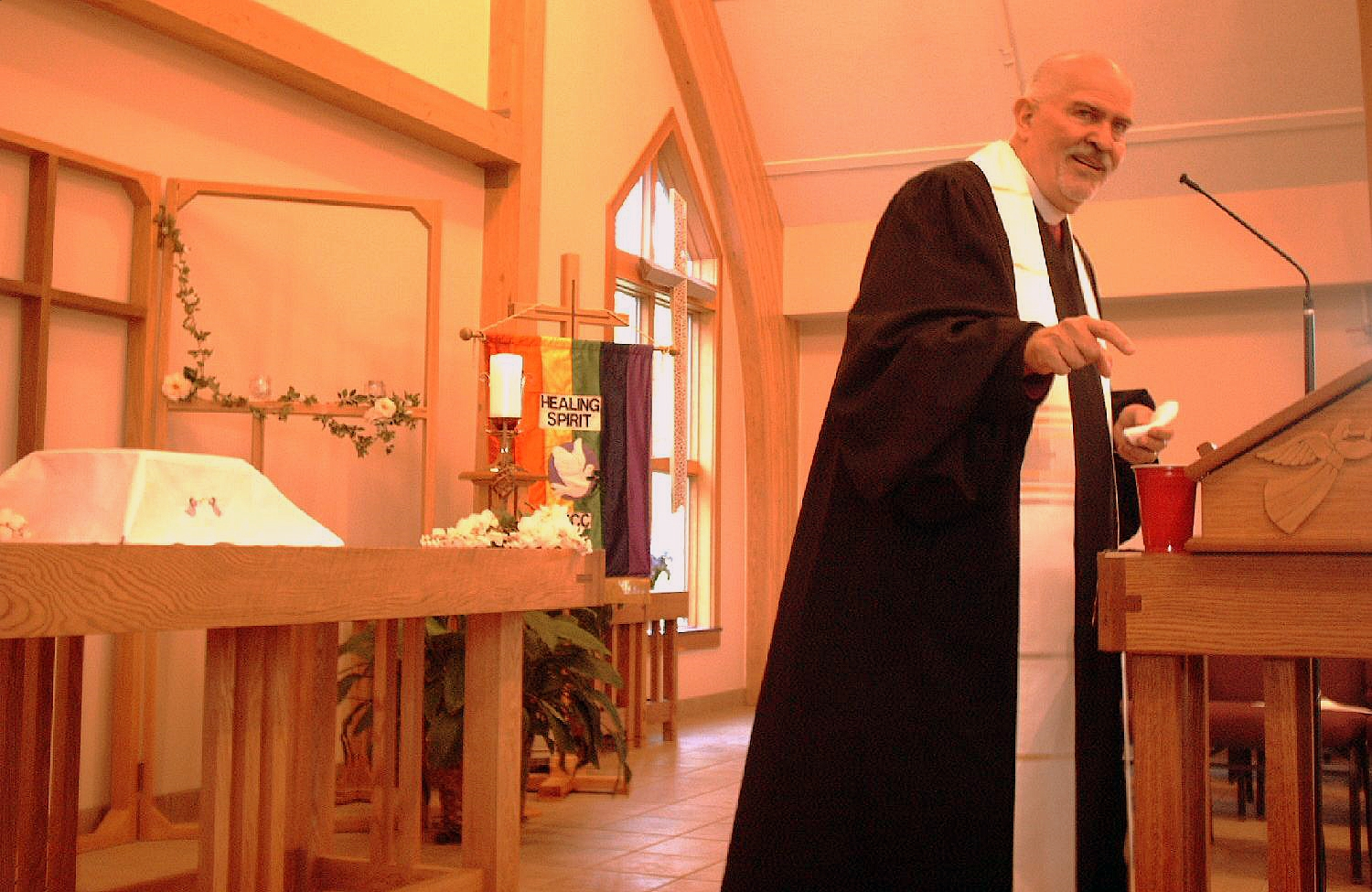
Perry preaching in 2006 at an MCC church in Minnesota.

Perry has written an autobiography, The Lord is My Shepherd and He Knows I'm Gay, first published in 1972 by Nash Publishing. He has written a sequel to this book, titled Don't Be Afraid Anymore, published in 1990 by St. Martin's Press and Profiles in Gay and Lesbian Courage also published by St. Martin's in 1992. He is a contributing editor for the book Is Gay Good? and his life is covered in Our God Too: Biography of a Church and a Temple.

In 2003, he completed 10 Spiritual Truths For Gays and Lesbians* (*and everyone else!).

Perry's television appearances include

- Virginia Graham Show, Sept 7, 1970
- Mike Douglas Show, Week of July 9, 1973
- Phil Donohue Show
- Tomorrow with Tom Snyder, June 4, 1974

Early Appearance in Print Publications include:

- Playboy Magazine, Sept 1973, Vol. 2, No. 9

His film appearances include:

- Sign of Protest, Documentary, Pat Rocco director, 1970
- God, Gays and the Gospel, Documentary, 1984
- Upstairs Inferno, Documentary, Robert L. Camina Director, 2015

Audio Appearances include:

- StoryCorps Rev. Troy Perry, Producers Liyna Anwar and Eve Claxton
- QueerCore Podcast "The Joy of Rev. Troy Perry's Salvation, Podcast Producer, August Bernadicou, May 2020

Print Articles on Perry include:

- The Pastor Behind the Gay Marriage Ruling, Christian Century, John Dart, June 17, 2008
- Pride in the Pews, Tablet, Maggie Phillips, June 23, 2021

== Personal life ==
Perry's mother became the first heterosexual member of the Metropolitan Community Church and supported her son until she died in 1993. He was reunited with his younger son, Michael, and performed the marriage uniting him and his daughter-in-law, but remains estranged from his elder son.

Perry has maintained a home in Los Angeles with Phillip Ray De Blieck, whom he married under Canadian law at the Metropolitan Community Church of Toronto. They sued the State of California upon their return home after their Toronto wedding for recognition of their marriage and won. The state appealed and the ruling was overturned by the State Supreme Court after five years in their favor.

== Tributes ==
In 2011, actor/playwright Jade Esteban Estrada portrayed Perry in the solo musical comedy "ICONS: The Lesbian and Gay History of the World, Vol. 5" which includes the song "I Will Follow You" sung by the character of Perry with music and lyrics by Estrada.

On October 6, 2018, a tribute to Perry on the 50th anniversary of his founding Metropolitan Community Church was held at the Episcopal Cathedral in Los Angeles. Guest speakers and dignitaries included California State Sen. Kevin de Leon and attorney Gloria Allred. Rodney Scott, President Emeritus of Christopher Street West / LAPRIDE, presented the Troy Perry Awards.

On June 11, 2021, the Los Angeles Dodgers baseball organization honored Perry, presenting him with the Dodgers Community Hero Lifetime Achievement Award at the eighth annual LGBTQ+ Night at Dodger Stadium.

== Bibliography ==
- Bullough, Vern L., ed. Before Stonewall: Activists for Gay and Lesbian Rights in Historical Context. New York: Harrington Park Press, 2002. ISBN 1-56023-192-0
- Clendinen, Dudley, and Adam Nagourney. Out for Good: The Struggle to Build a Gay Rights Movement in America. New York: Simon & Schuster, 1999. ISBN 9780684867434
- Downs, Jim. Stand By Me: The Forgotten History of Gay Liberation. New York: Basic Books, 2016. ISBN 9780465032709
- Dunak, Karen M. As Long As We Both Shall Love: The White Wedding in Postwar America. New York University Press, 2013. ISBN 9780814737811
- Faderman, Lillian, and Stuart Timmons. Gay LA: A History of Sexual Outlaws, Power Politics, and Lipstick Lesbians. Berkeley: University of California Press, 2009. ISBN 9780520260610
- Hirshman, Linda. Victory: The Triumphant Gay Revolution. Pymble, N.S.W. : HarperCollins Australia, 2013. ISBN 9780061965517
- Tobin, Kay, and Randy Wicker. The Gay Crusaders. New York: Arno, 1975. ISBN 0-405-07374-7

Preceded by Founder	Moderator of the Universal Fellowship of Metropolitan Community Churches; 1968–2005	Succeeded by Rev Nancy Wilson
