= Metropolitan Community Church =

International LGBT-affirming Protestant Christian denomination

- Classification: Protestant
- Orientation: Mainline
- Theology: Trinitarianism; Queer theology
- Polity: Congregationalist
- Moderator: Cecilia Eggleston
- Region: 20 countries
- Founder: Troy Perry
- Origin: 1968; Los Angeles, California, US
- Congregations: 172
- Members: 40,000 (Encyclopedia Britannica, 2025)
- Official website: www.mccchurch.org

The Metropolitan Community Church (MCC), also known as the Universal Fellowship of Metropolitan Community Churches (UFMCC), is an international LGBT-affirming mainline Protestant Christian denomination. MCC claims to be “the world’s first church group with a primary, positive ministry to gays, lesbians, bisexual, and transgender persons.”

The fellowship has Official Observer status with the World Council of Churches. The MCC was denied membership in the US National Council of Churches in 1992, but many local MCC congregations are members of local ecumenical partnerships around the world and MCC currently belongs to several statewide councils of churches in the United States. The MCC has also been considered to be non-denominational.

According to a census of the association published in 2025, it had 172 churches in 20 countries. According to the Encyclopedia Britannica, the MCC claims 40,000 members.

== History ==
The first congregation was founded in Huntington Park, California, by former Baptist minister Troy Perry in 1968. Perry felt called to return to religious work after a suicide attempt in 1967, and after his friend was arrested during a police raid on a gay bar in 1968. This was a time when Christian attitudes toward homosexuality were almost universally unfavorable. The first congregation originally met in Perry's Huntington Park home on October 6th, 1968, which 12 people attended. The church first gained publicity by ads taken out in The Advocate magazine. Perry declared the church was made up of born again believers.

In 1969 the congregation had outgrown Perry's living room and moved to rented space at the Huntington Park Women's Club. It was at this point in time membership in the church grew to about 200 people. Due to discrimination the church was forced to move, and had a hard time finding a permanent place. During this period during the spring and summer of 1969 the church moved first to the Embassy Auditorium, and then a United Methodist Church for two weeks. The church ended up renting out the Encore Theatre in Hollywood from 1969 through 1971.

Within months of the first worship service, Perry began receiving letters and visits from people who wanted to start Metropolitan Community Churches in other cities. MCC groups from eight US cities were represented at the first General Conference in 1970: Los Angeles, San Francisco, San Diego, and Costa Mesa, California; Chicago, Illinois; Phoenix, Arizona; Kaneohe, Hawaii; and Dallas, Texas. An MCC group existed in Miami, Florida, but did not send a delegate. At the conference, the congregations formed the Universal Fellowship of Metropolitan Community Churches (UFMCC) as their governing body.

The church moved to a building it purchased at 2201 South Union Avenue in Los Angeles in 1971. The building was consecrated on March 7, 1971. MCC says this purchase makes them “the first gay/lesbian organization in the USA to own its own property." They also shared this building with Beth Chayim Chadashim, the world's first LGBTQ synagogue. MCC worshiped there until January 27, 1973, when the building was destroyed in two suspected arson attacks, which the Los Angeles Fire Department called fires "of suspicious origin." Multiple other MCC locations were the targets of arson attacks in 1973, including the Nashville Mission location and the San Francisco church location, which were both destroyed.

An additional arson attack in 1973 at the UpStairs Lounge in New Orleans killed 32 people, including one-third of MCC New Orleans’ congregation. This fire was “the largest mass killing of gays and lesbians in the United States until the 2016 massacre at Pulse.” By 1982, 17 MCC churches were damaged or destroyed by fire.

In 1972 Freda Smith became the first female minister in MCC, and was the first woman elected to the Board of Elders in 1973 at the fourth general conference in Atlanta, when the Board of Elders was expanded from four members to seven. Later MCC adopted gender inclusive language in its worship services.

In 1973 MCC began its Global Outreach program and established MCC locations in of London, England and Ontario, Canada. Soon after, they sought to connect with the larger Christian community by applying to the National Council of Churches of Christ in the USA (NCC) in 1981. In 1992, NCC formally denied MCC’s membership and also denied them observer status.

In 1974, MCC Los Angeles purchased the Belasco Theater to house the congregation and the UFMCC offices. In 1987, MCC Los Angeles decided to sell its building and purchased property at Washington & La Cienega in Culver City, CA. However, in 1994 the building was destroyed in the Northridge earthquake. By 1996, the church was able to purchase a new property at Santa Monica Boulevard. In 2008, they moved again, and in 2012, MCC Los Angeles moved a final time to their current location on Prospect Ave in Los Angeles, CA.

Around 2000, church leadership began to analyze its organizational structure, particularly as Troy Perry announced he would retire in the upcoming years. The denomination also felt the need to adjust as they began to decline in membership and have continued to decline since the 2000s. In 2003, MCC lost a significant number of members when the Cathedral of Hope congregation in Dallas, Texas disaffiliated from MCC. The congregation left as Rev. Michael Piazza was investigated by MCC for “financial mismanagement, insurance fraud, and abusive leadership.” They were the largest MCC church at the time, accounting for 3,000 members out of 46,000 total MCC members. In 2006, the Cathedral of Hope became a member congregation of the United Church of Christ (UCC).

On November 10, 2003, MCC received a letter from then-President George W. Bush that congratulated the church for its 35th anniversary. Perry publicly questioned the motives for the letter being sent and characterized it as "puzzling," given that he had proclaimed the week of October 12 to 18, 2003, as Marriage Protection Week. The White House did not respond to requests for comment, and Bush would continue to oppose same-sex marriage throughout his time in office.

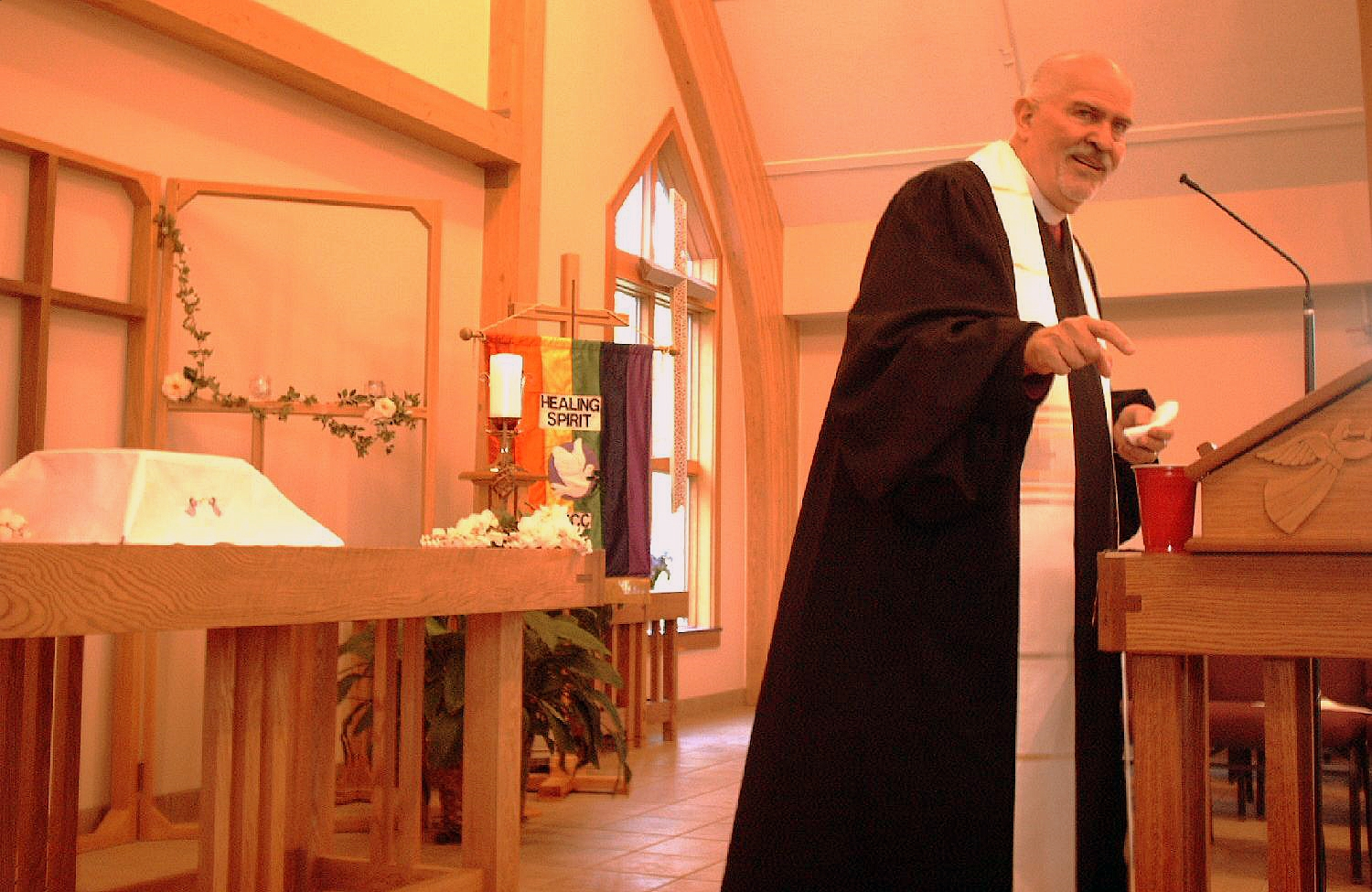
Perry at an MCC church in 2006

Perry served as moderator of the fellowship until 2005, when Nancy Wilson was elected moderator by the General Conference; she was formally installed in a special service at the Washington National Cathedral in Washington, DC, on October 29, 2005. She is only the second person, and the first woman, to serve as moderator. She was also reelected in 2010.

In 2010, the first MCC congregation in Spain would be established in Madrid in October. If successfully established, the MCC would have been the first recognized church in Spain to officially solemnize same-sex marriages. An MCC congregation was not permanently established in Madrid in 2010, but it is unclear why. In 2018, the first religiously affiliated same-sex wedding recorded in Spain was performed by a vicar of the Lutheran Church of Sweden. The Lutheran Church of Sweden and the MCC are in partial communion with each other and the vicar is stationed in Spain on a long term 5-year mission. Despite these facts he cannot legally officiate any wedding wherein either party is a Spanish citizen and can only perform ceremonies in which at least one participant is a Swedish citizen. Later that year an MCC congregation finally opened in Madrid. As of 2020, the MCC website describes their "emerging" congregation in Madrid as thriving and expanding. When or if this congregation has performed any LGBTQ weddings is unclear, however.

In 2011 the Good Shepherd Parish of the MCC was inducted into the Chicago Gay and Lesbian Hall of Fame.

From 2016 to 2019, Rev. Elder Rachelle Brown served as an interim moderator. In 2017, MCC decided to restructure its leadership, which included a greater focus on diversity, equity, and inclusion. It also included the elimination of the Office of Emerging Ministries where Darlene Garner worked. Garner was ordained in 1988 and became the first Black person on the Council of Elders in 1993. On August 23, 2017, Garner was informed that she would be placed on sabbatical and that her position would be terminated on December 31st. Garner disagreed with the terms of the separation agreement and said the decision came without warning. Several MCC board members also left in protest. In response, MCC allowed Garner to continue unpaid on the Council of Elders until she retired in March 2018.

In 2019 Rev. Elder Cecilia Eggleston was elected as MCC’s moderator and was reelected in 2025.

== Beliefs and practices ==
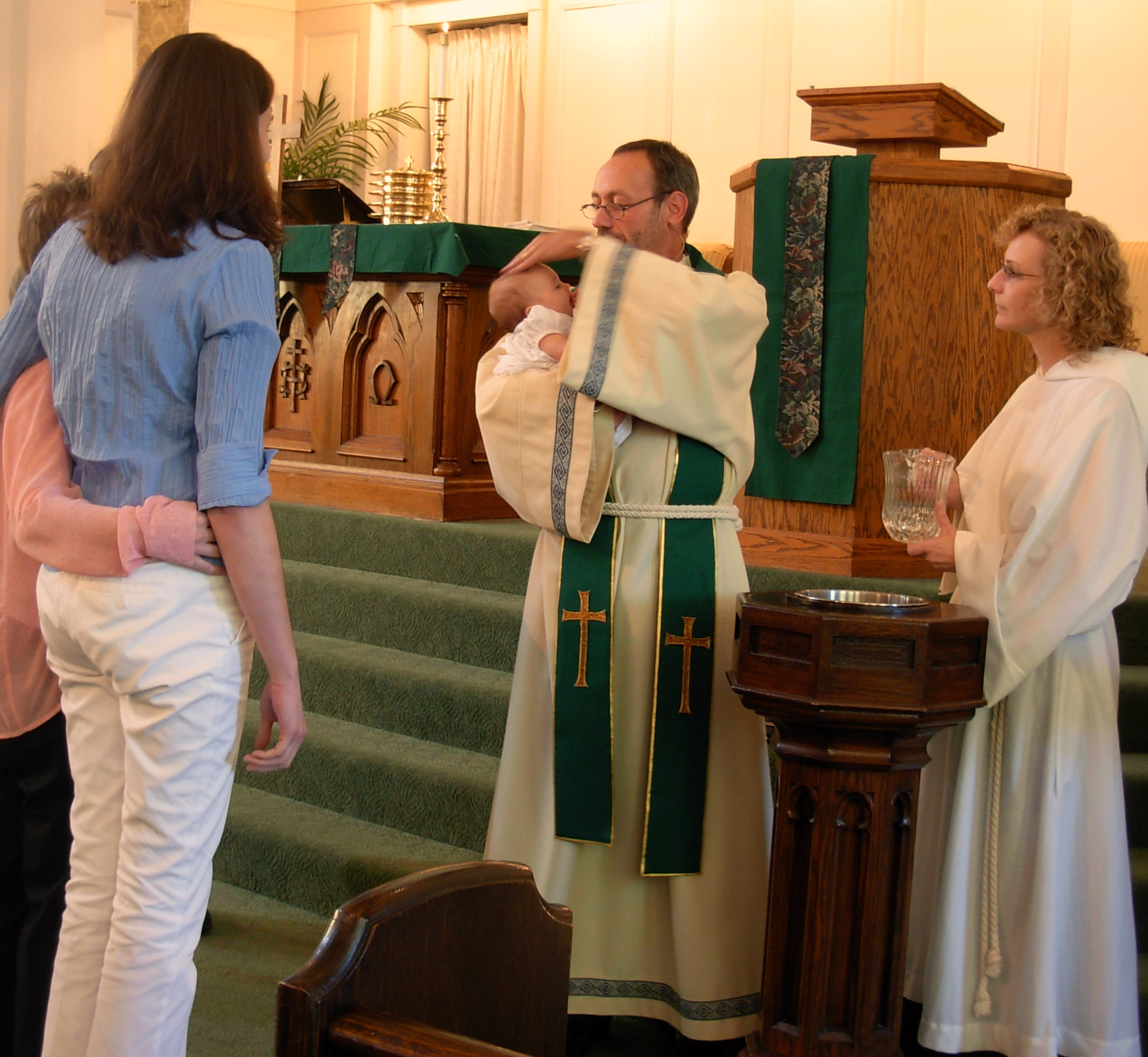
Infant baptism in an MCC church

MCC bases its theology on the historic creeds of the Christian Church, such as Apostles' and Nicene creeds. Every church is required to celebrate the Eucharist at least once a week, and to practice open communion, meaning that recipients need not be a member of the MCC or any other church to receive the Eucharist. Beyond that MCC allows its member churches independence in doctrine, practice, and worship as worship styles vary from church to church. The MCC is considered to be Bible-based and many pastors take a fundamentalist approach to scripture.

MCC sees its mission being social as well as spiritual by standing up for the rights of minorities, particularly those of lesbian, gay, bisexual, and transgender (LGBTQ) people. MCC has been a leading force in the development of queer theology.

Many local churches are also involved with other national and international campaigns, including Trade Justice and Make Poverty History.

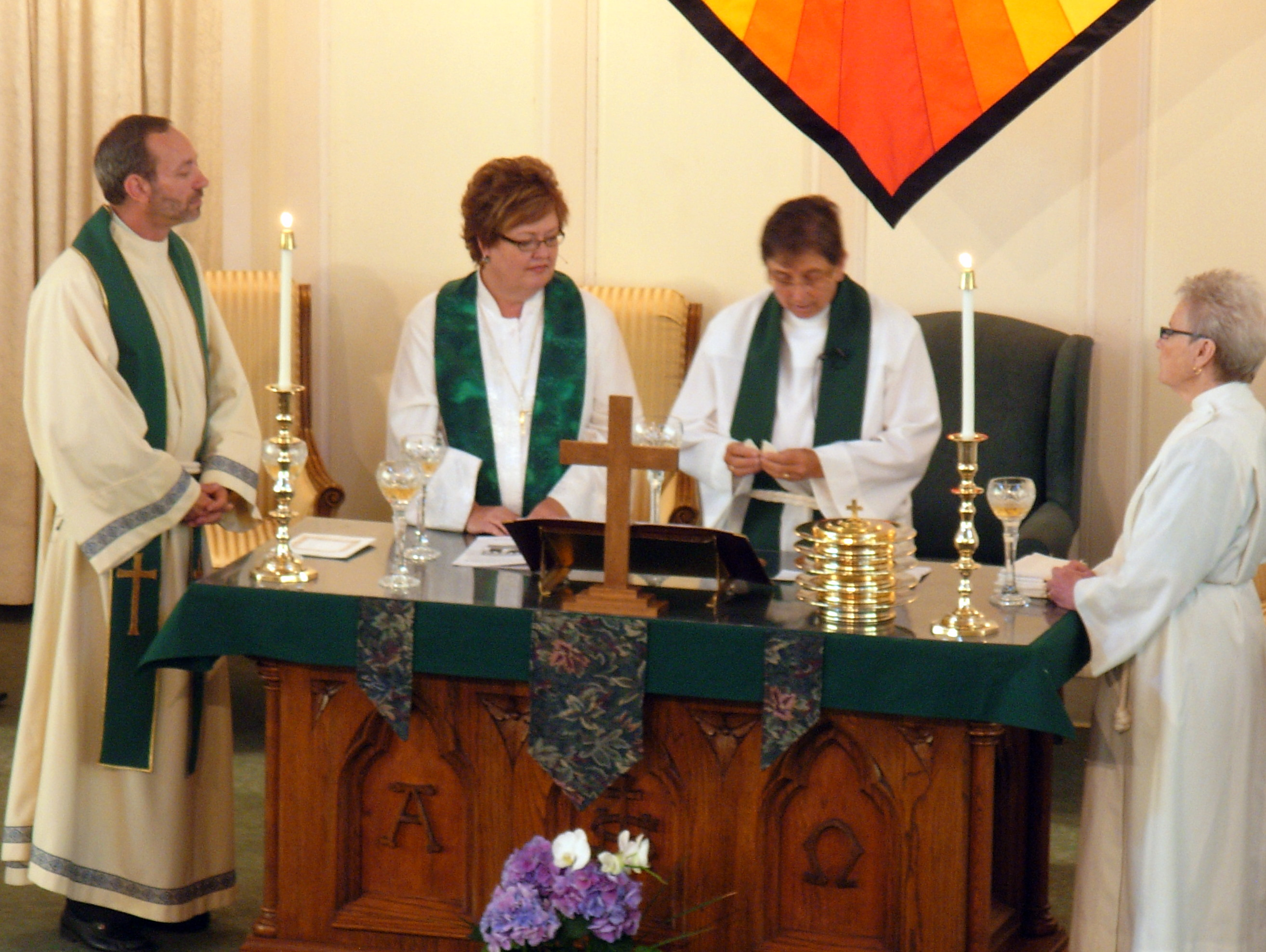
Communion at All God's Children MCC in Minneapolis, Minnesota, US

The MCC supports same-sex marriage, and has performed the first church-based weddings for same-sex couples in the United Kingdom. MCC's founder, Troy Perry, performed the first public same-sex marriage in the United States in Huntington Park, California, in 1969. In 1970, he filed the first lawsuit in the US seeking legal recognition for same-sex marriages. Perry lost that lawsuit but launched the debate over marriage equality in the US. Today, MCC congregations around the world perform more than 6000 same-sex union/marriage ceremonies annually.

Brent Hawkes and the Metropolitan Community Church of Toronto were key players in the legal action that ultimately brought same-sex marriage to Canada.

A notable aspect of MCC's theology is its position on homosexuality and Christianity, where it fully embraces and welcomes LGBT people. Indeed, the majority of members are lesbian, gay, bisexual, or transgender, with many clergy being openly LGBT. MCC fully affirms the ministry of both men and women, seeing them as equal, and the past election of Nancy Wilson as Moderator makes MCC one of a small number of communions with female senior leadership. The MCC also believes that abortion should be legal.

In 2016, a new statement of faith was passed, almost unanimously, and was adopted at the 26th General Conference in Victoria, British Columbia. It is now considered one of the core documents of MCC, separate from its bylaws, as it is part of MCC formation and identity, but not part of its governance policies.

MCC is currently a plaintiff in New England Synod, Evangelical Lutheran Church in America v. Department of Homeland Security (D. Mass.), 4:25-cv-40102. The preliminary injunction bars immigration enforcement agents from raiding conducting warrantless arrests at any of the plaintiffs’ churches.

== Governance and administration ==
=== Leadership ===
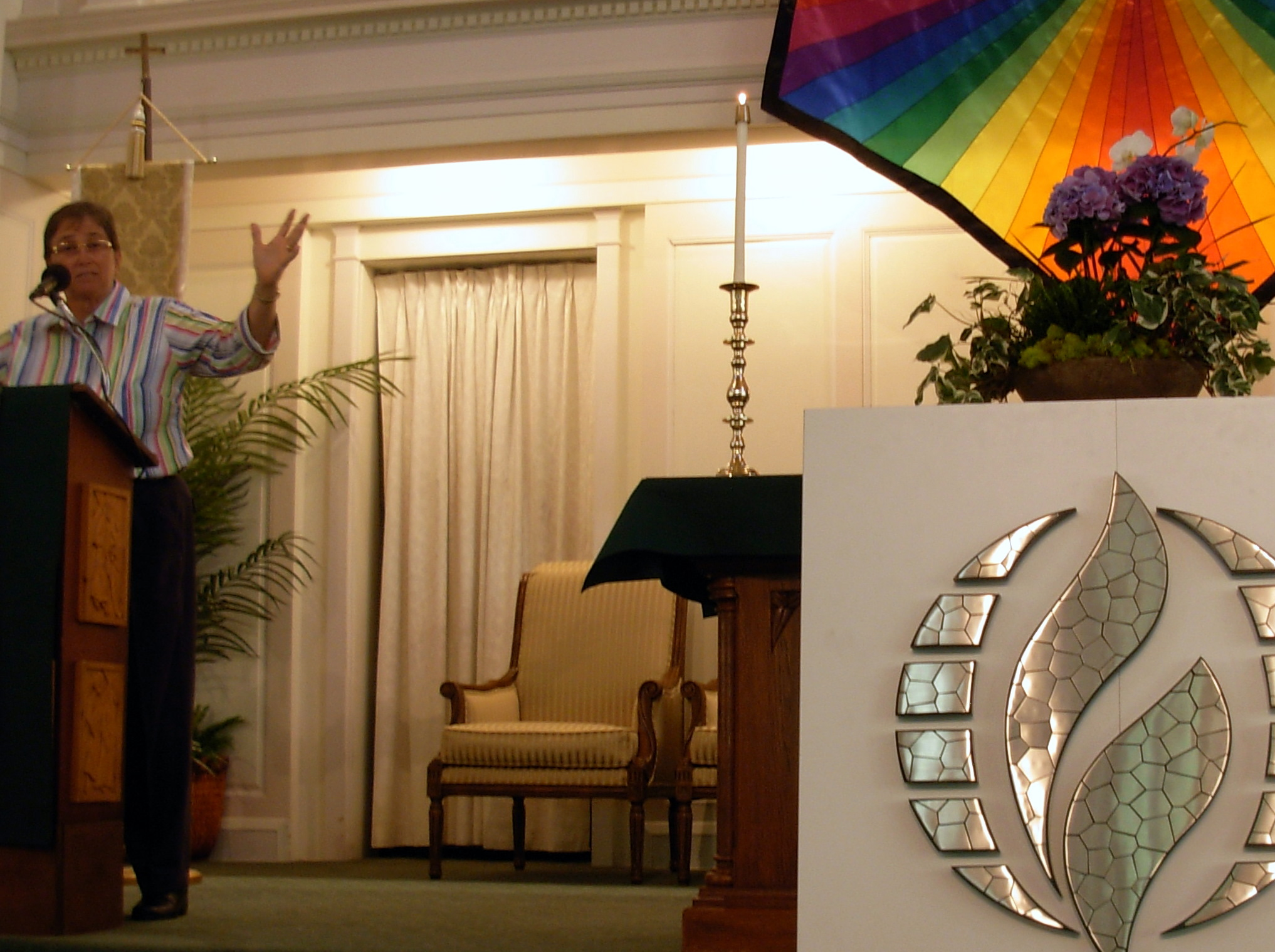
Moderator Nancy Wilson preaching at an MCC church in Minneapolis in 2008

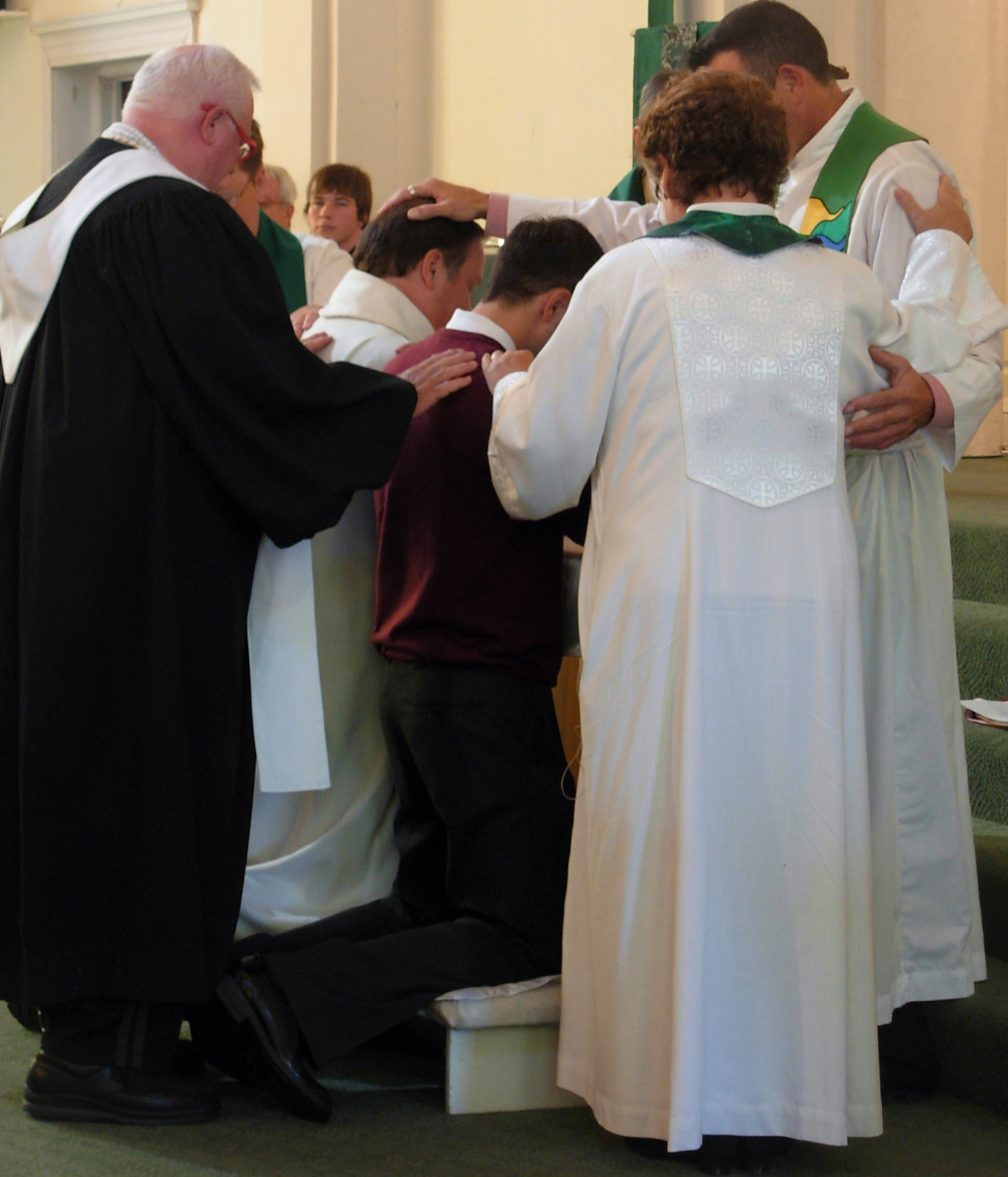
Ordination of clergy by the laying on of hands

MCC is led by a Council of Elders (COE) and a Governing Board. The Council of Elders consists of a Moderator and elders appointed by the Moderator, approved by the Governing Board, and affirmed by the General Conference. The COE has responsibility for leading the fellowship on matters of spirituality, mission development, and Christian witness. The Governing Board is made up of the Moderator, four Lay members and four Clergy members elected by General Conference, and is the legal corporate board of the denomination, handling responsibility for financial and fiduciary matters.

As of 2016, the Council of Elders includes Rachelle Brown (Moderator), Nancy Wilson, Ines-Paul Baumann, Pat Bumgardner, Tony Freeman, Darlene Garner, Hector Gutierrez, Dwayne Johnson, Nancy Maxwell, Margarita Sánchez de Léon, Candace Shultis, and Mona West. The Governing Board includes Rachelle Brown (Interim Moderator and Chair ex officio), Joe Cobb, Victoria L. Burson, Miak Siew, and Dr. David L. Williams.

The elders serve as official representatives of the fellowship in the areas of public and community relations; provide oversight of and support to congregations; consult with churches on issues related to church development; and fulfill other ecclesial and ceremonial duties.

In July 2019, a new Moderator and Governing Board were elected at the MCC General Conference in Orlando, Florida. The Moderator is Rev. Elder Cecilia Eggleston. The Governing Board consists of Rev. Marie Alford-Harkey, Rev. Alberto Nájera, Rev. Elder Diane Fisher, and Rev. Paul Whiting, representing Clergy, and Chad Hobbs, Clare Coughlin, James Chavis, and Mark Godette, representing Laity.

==== Moderators ====
- Troy Perry (1968–2005)
- Nancy Wilson (2005–2016)
- Rachelle Brown (2016–2019, interim)
- Cecilia Eggleston (2019–present)

=== General Conference ===
Internationally, the government of the UFMCC is vested in the tri-annual General Conference, subject to the provisions of the fellowship Articles of Incorporation, its bylaws, or documents of legal organization. The General Conference is authorized to receive the reports from the various boards, committees, commissions and councils of the fellowship. Throughout its history the General Conference has met both in and outside of the continental United States, in places such as Sydney, Australia, and Toronto, Ontario, and Calgary, Alberta, in Canada. The 2010 General Conference was held in Acapulco, Guerrero, with future conferences occurring every three years. The 2013 General Conference was held in Chicago, Illinois, US, followed by Victoria, British Columbia, Canada, in 2016 and Orlando, Florida, US, in 2019.

=== List of regions ===
The worldwide church is administratively divided into seven regions, each of which are represented by an elder on the Council of Elders. Since the 2000s, many are further divided into sub-regional networks.

- Region 1: Region 1 Australia, Bangladesh, Brunei, Cambodia, Western Canada (British Columbia, Yukon), China, Micronesia, Fiji, Hong Kong, India, Indonesia, Japan, Laos, Malaysia, Mongolia, Myanmar, Nepal, New Zealand, North Korea, Pakistan, Papua New Guinea, Philippines, Eastern Russia, South Korea, Sri Lanka, Sumatra, Taiwan, Thailand, Vanuatu, Vietnam and the United States (Alaska, California (Northern), Hawaii, Idaho, Montana, North Dakota, Oregon, South Dakota, Utah, Washington, and Wyoming).
  - Australasia Network
  - Pacific Northwest Network
  - Valley & Bay Area Network
  - Asia & Pacific Islands Network
- Region 2 – Canada (Manitoba and Nunavut), and the United States (Alabama, Arkansas, Georgia, Illinois, Iowa, Kansas, Louisiana, Minnesota, Mississippi, Missouri, Tennessee, Texas (Eastern), and Wisconsin).
  - Georgia, Tennessee, Alabama Network
  - Heartland Network
  - North Central US Network
  - South Gulf Coast Network

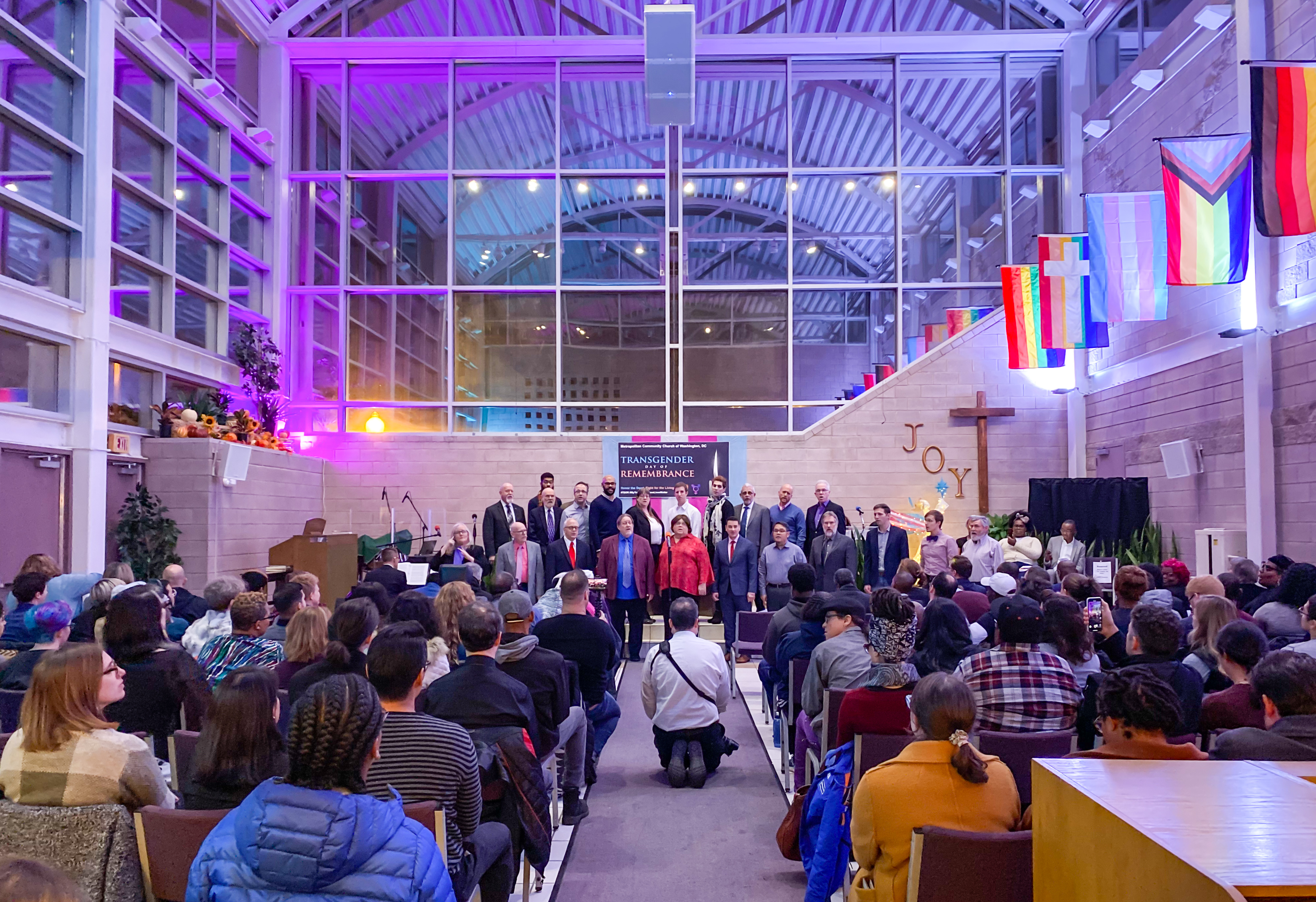
Metropolitan Community Church of Washington, DC sanctuary during the 2019 Transgender Day of Remembrance

- Region 3 – Antigua & Barbuda, Bahamas, Barbados, Bermuda, Cuba, Dominican Republic, Grenada, Guadeloupe, Haiti, Jamaica, Martinique, Puerto Rico, St. Kitts & Nevis, St. Lucia, St. Vincent, Trinidad, Tobago, Turks & Caicos Islands, Virgin Islands and the United States (Delaware, Maryland, New Jersey, New York, North Carolina, Pennsylvania, South Carolina, Virginia, the District of Columbia (Washington, DC).
  - Northeast United States Network
  - DC, Delaware, Maryland & Virginia Network
  - Carolinas Network

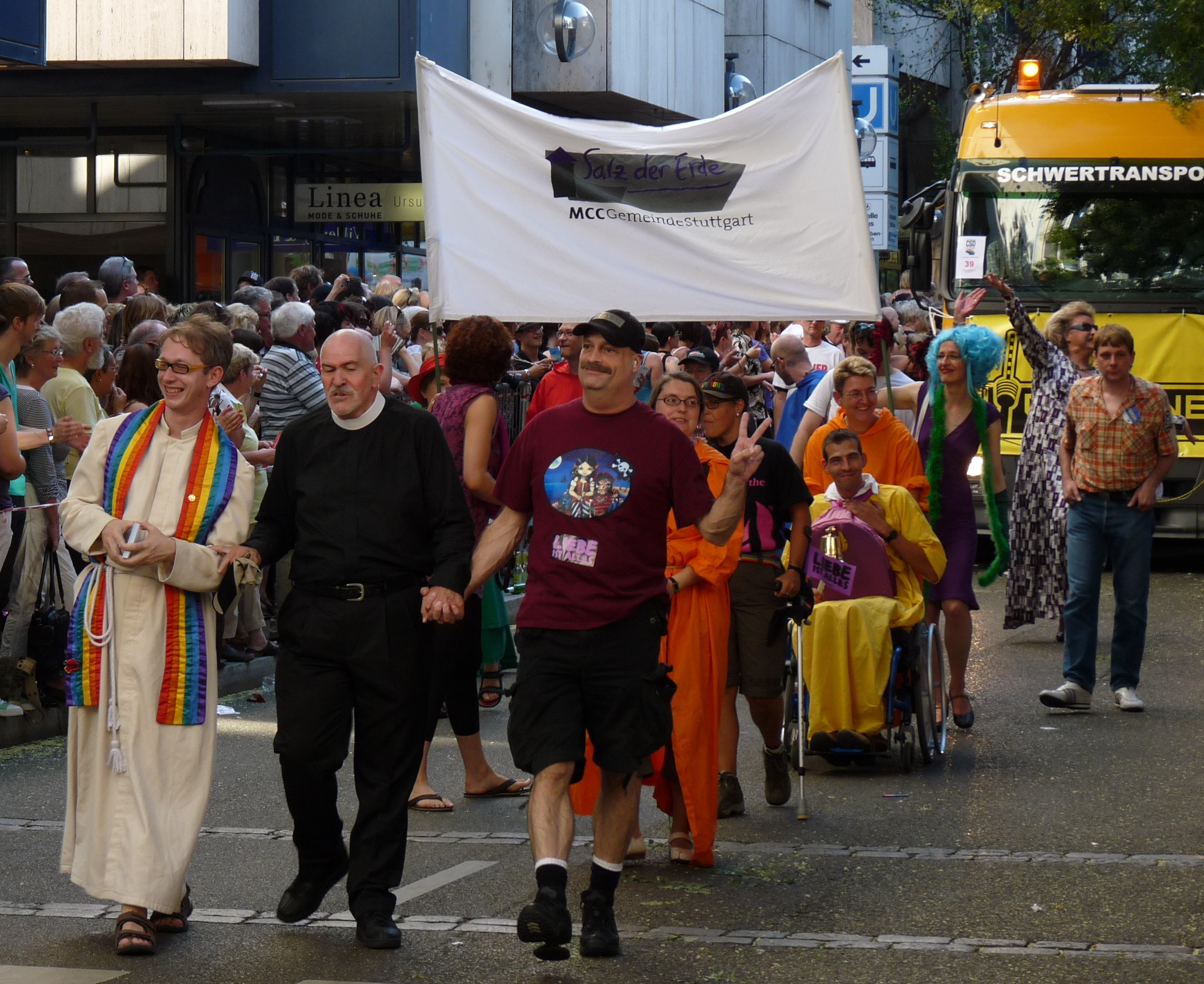
MCC of Stuttgart, Germany, taking part the Christopher Street Day march in 2009

- Region 4 – Afghanistan, Algeria, Angola, Austria, Azerbaijan, Bahrain, Belgium, Benin, Botswana, Burundi, Cameroon, Central African Republic, Chad, Congo, Denmark, Egypt, England, Eswatini, Ethiopia, Finland, France, Gabon, Germany, Ghana, Greece, Greenland, Holland, Iceland, Iran, Iraq, Ireland, Israel, Italy, Jordan, Kenya, Kuwait, Lebanon, Liberia, Libya, Morocco, Mozambique, Namibia, Niger, Nigeria, Norway, Oman, Portugal, Rwanda, Saudi Arabia, Scotland, Senegal, Sierra Leone, Somalia, South Africa, Spain, Sudan, Sweden, Syria, Tanzania, Togo, Tunisia, Uganda, United Arab Emirates, Wales, Yemen, Zambia, and Zimbabwe.
  - Western Europe/United Kingdom Network
  - African Network
- Region 5 – Albania, Armenia, Belarus, Bosnia-Herzegovina, Bulgaria, Croatia, Eastern Canada (Baffin Island, New Brunswick, Newfoundland, Nova Scotia, Ontario, Prince Edward Island, Quebec), Estonia, Georgia, Hungary, Kazakhstan, Kosovo, Kyrgyzstan, Latvia, Lithuania, Macedonia, Moldova, Montenegro, Poland, Romania, Russia, Serbia, Slovakia, Slovenia, The Czech Republic, Tajikistan, Turkey, Turkmenistan, Ukraine, United States (Connecticut, Indiana, Kentucky, Maine, Massachusetts, Michigan, New Hampshire, Ohio, Rhode Island, Vermont, West Virginia), Uzbekistan, Vojvodina.
  - Central US East Network
  - Canadian, Michigan & Windsor Network
- Region 6 – Antarctica, Argentina, Belize, Bolivia, Brazil, Chile, Colombia, Costa Rica, Ecuador, El Salvador, French Guiana, Guatemala, Guyana, Honduras, Mexico, Nicaragua, Panama, Paraguay, Peru, Suriname, Uruguay, Venezuela and the United States (Arizona, California (Southern), Nevada, New Mexico, and Texas (Southern).
  - Southern California/Nevada Network
  - Arizona, New Mexico & El Paso Network
  - Southern Texas Network
  - Ibero-America & Caribbean Network
- Region 7 – Western Canada (Alberta, Saskatchewan, Northwest Territories), and the United States (Colorado, Florida, Nebraska, Oklahoma, and Texas (Northern).
  - North Florida Network
  - Central Florida Network
  - North Texas and Oklahoma Network
  - South Florida Network

=== Local congregations ===
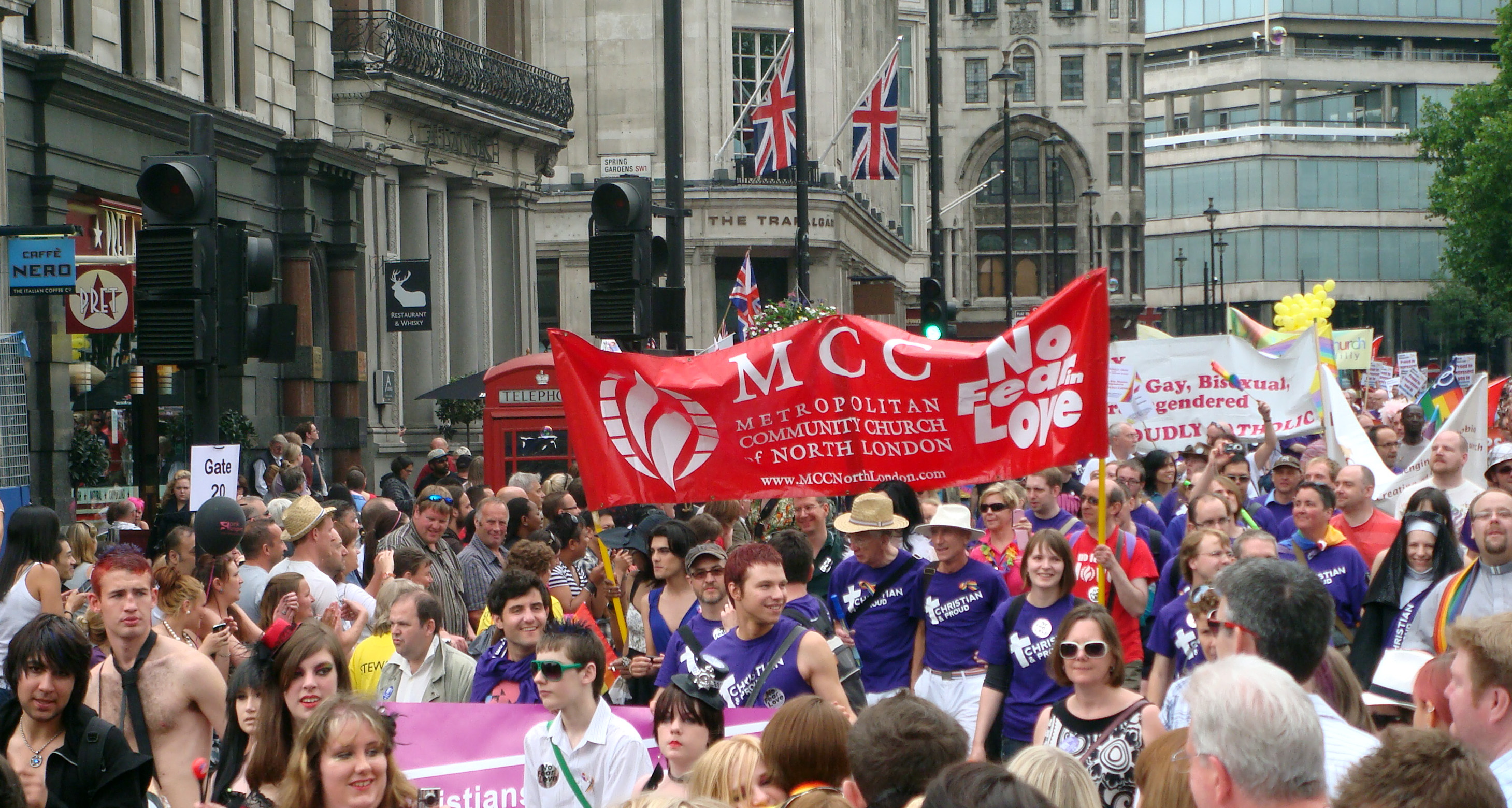
MCC of North London taking part in Pride London 2011

Each affiliated member church of MCC is a self-governing, legally autonomous body, is vested in its congregational meeting which exerts the right to control all of its affairs, subject to the provisions of the UFMCC Articles of Incorporation, bylaws, or documents of legal organization, and the General Conference. An ordained pastor provides spiritual leadership and administrative leadership as the moderator of a local church administrative body. In the United States and Canada the local church administrative body is usually called "board of directors". Each local congregation is required to send a tithe or assessment of income to UFMCC, currently set to reduce from 15% of income to 10% by 1% every two years stating in 2005. Each local church elects its own pastor from the roster of MCC credentialed clergy.

Each local congregation is free to determine matters of worship, practice, theology and ministry providing they meet certain basic requirements involving open access to communion and subscription to the traditional Christian creeds. Styles of worship include liturgical, charismatic, evangelical, traditional and modern—diversity is an important part of MCC.

== Controversies ==
=== Cathedral of Hope disaffiliation ===
In 2003, a scandal occurred involving the flagship of the church, as well as the largest gay church in the world, Cathedral of Hope, when former board member Terri Frey accused minister Michael S. Piazza of financial impropriety, an accusation that prompted the UFMCC to open an investigation. However, the investigation ended when the cathedral's membership voted to disaffiliate from UFMCC with 88% support. In 2006, the Cathedral of Hope was received into membership in the United Church of Christ. The split cost UFMCC 9% of its membership, and 7% of its annual operating budget. Church members, including copastor Mona West, claimed that the vote was less about the investigation and more about the congregation's long-simmering frustration with the denomination, including the opinion that the denomination was focused too much on gay issues and hampered their desire to reach out to Dallas residents disaffected by conservative churches; as church member Michael Magnia explained: "The tie with MCC was more about gays and lesbians. You're going to have a difficult time getting even progressive heterosexuals to come to a church that is anchored to a gay and lesbian church."

=== Blessing of same-sex unions in Philippines ===
In June 2011, the Metropolitan Community Church of Baguio solemnized the union of one gay couple and seven lesbian couples at a bar called Ayuyang Bar. This is the first MCC Baguio ceremony that has agitated the Philippines' mainstream evangelical churches.

MCC Baguio is a local chapter of the MCC in Quezon City, which ministers to homosexuals. Pastor Myke Sotero of MCC Baguio stated that the service was a "Christian celebration of love and relationship". The rites are not considered marriage since the Philippine government does not recognize gay marriage. Couples who participated in the union were also criticized by local church leaders.

== Notable clergy ==
This list includes notable present and former clergy associated with MCC.

- James Ferry
- Flo Fleischman
- Darlene Garner
- Chris Glaser
- Bob Goss
- Brent Hawkes
- Troy Perry (founder, moderator from 1968-2005)
- Marge Ragona
- Jeff Rock
- Robert Sirico (former MCC minister)
- Rembert S. Truluck
- Jean White
- Mel White
- Nancy Wilson (moderator, 2005-2016)
- Bob Wolfe

== See also ==
- Lesbian and Gay Christian Movement
- New Pacific Academy
- Queer theology
- UpStairs Lounge arson attack
