= LGBTQ history in Georgia =

LGBTQ history in Georgia may refer to:

- LGBTQ history in Georgia (country)
- LGBTQ history in Georgia (U.S. state)

== See also ==
- LGBTQ topics in Georgia Includes both country and state
