= Fricker =

Fricker is surname. Notable people with the surname include:

- Brenda Fricker (1945–2026), Academy Award-winning Irish actress
- Edward Thomas Fricker (1858–1917), Australian newspaper editor
- Lizzie Fricker, fellow and tutor at Magdalen College, Oxford
- Mark Fricker (born 1959), sub-four-minute miler of the 1980s
- Miranda Fricker (born 1966), English philosopher
- Olga Fricker (1902–1997), Canadian-born dancer, educator and choreographer
- Oliver Fricker (born 1977/78), Swiss criminal
- Pat Fricker (1916–1970), Australian rules footballer and former captain
- Peter Racine Fricker (1920–1990), English composer who lived in the US for the last 30 years of his life
- Sara Fricker (1772–1834), wife of English poet Samuel Taylor Coleridge
- Sylvia Fricker Tyson, CM (born 1940), musician, performer, singer-songwriter and broadcaster
- Werner Fricker (1936–2001), U.S. soccer halfback and president of the US Soccer Federation

== See also ==
- Fricker Glacier, north of Monnier Point flowing into Mill Inlet, on the east coast of Graham Land
- Bricker, a surname
- Fricke, a surname
- Frickley (disambiguation)
