= Tim Seelig =

American conductor, singer, and educator

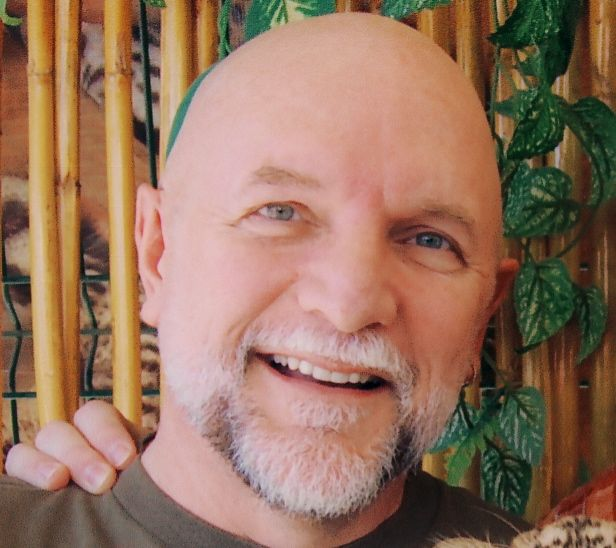
- Born: January 10, 1951 (age 75); Fort Worth, Texas, U.S.
- Education: DMA, Doctor of Musical Arts
- Alma mater: University of North Texas, Mozarteum
- Employer: San Francisco Gay Men's Chorus
- Website: timseelig.com

Tim Seelig (born January 10, 1951) is an American conductor, singer, and educator. He was the Artistic Director of the San Francisco Gay Men's Chorus for 11+ seasons until retirement in 2022 when he was honored as Conductor Laureate. In 2024, Seelig moved to Portland, Oregon, and was hired to direct the first season of the Portland Sage Singers, a 55+ chorus that promotes the value of Q+ Elders and Allies. In addition, he guest-conducts and presents workshops in the US and around the world.

Seelig joined the Turtle Creek Chorale in 1987 and served as its conductor for two decades during which he co-founded The Women's Chorus of Dallas. In 1999, he conducted the World's Longest Choral Concert as declared by Guinness World Records. At Turtle Creek, he recorded a total of 36 compact discs. For his work at Turtle Creek, he was named the Conductor Emeritus.

He has authored five books on the topics of choral music and vocal technique. He is the author of The Perfect Blend, The Perfect Rehearsal, The Perfect Choral Workbook, The Music Within and Quick Fixes. As a clinician, he has appeared at state, regional and national conferences of the American Choral Directors Association and the Music Educators National Conference.

== Early life and education ==
Seelig was born and raised in Fort Worth, Texas in a devout Southern Baptist family. His mother was a singer and voice teacher and father the Vice President of Southwestern Baptist Theological Seminary. He sang in church choirs in the Baptist church from his earliest days. After completing high school, he majored in vocal performance and subsequently completed a master's degree and a Doctorate of Musical Arts from the University of North Texas.

Since teenage years, he dreamed about studying in Salzburg, Austria, having been impressed by the beauty of the place during a family vacation. When he was 24, he moved to Salzburg, enrolled at the conservatory where he received a Diploma in Lieder and Oratorio. Upon completing his degree at Mozarteum, he and his wife returned to the United States to continue studies and begin teaching. Seelig was then offered a job at the Swiss National Opera and moved, with his wife and two small children, to Switzerland. He made his European operatic debut at the Staatsoper in St. Gallen, Switzerland. Upon total immersion in the life of a full-time opera singer, he realized it did not fit his personality or goals in life. He returned to the United States and resumed teaching at Houston Baptist University and began serving as Associate Minister of Music at The First Baptist Church of Houston.

== Career ==
=== 1986 - 2003 ===
In 1986, Seelig made the decision that he could no longer hide the fact that he was gay. Coming out brought instant repercussions. He was fired by the church lost his home, family, and most of his friends. He found out about a gay men's chorus in Dallas, the Turtle Creek Chorale, that was looking for a conductor. During his academic career, he had majored in vocal performance and minored in conducting. That minor and course of study proved useful. He applied for the job and was selected. When Seelig joined the TCC in 1987, it was in financial trouble. Through his work, the chorale began making profit again by 1989 and had grown from the original 40 singers to 200. In the 1980s the US was witnessing an epidemic of AIDS in gay men. Being the leader of a gay men's chorus, Seelig actively worked to support the fight against AIDS. The chorale itself lost almost 200 of its members during the epidemic. In 1994, Seelig and his chorus' efforts to cope with the grief brought about by the epidemic was featured in After Goodbye: An AIDS Story, a documentary directed by Ginny Martin. The documentary went on to win twelve awards including an Emmy.

In 1989, he co-founded the Women's Chorus of Dallas and conducted it off and on for the next twelve years. In 1989, he made his solo debut at Carnegie Hall, which was reviewed by the New York Times, which called him "an expressive performer." Seelig began teaching voice and vocal pedagogy at the Meadows School for the Arts at Southern Methodist University in 1996. In 1999, Seelig conducted the World's longest choral concert at the Lakewood Theatre in Dallas. The show lasted for twenty hours as celebration of the 20th anniversary of the chorale. It was also a homage to the people the chorale had lost to AIDS.

=== 2003 - 2010 ===
In 2005, the Turtle Creek Chorale was approached to do a follow-up documentary to the 1994 After Goodbye. Seelig agreed and they produced The Power of Harmony about gay marriage, adoption and other important GLBT topics of the time. Seelig's first book The Perfect Blend was published in March 2005 by the Shawnee Press. The book provided vocal technique for choral singers. It included 100 exercises, rehearsal and programming tips as well as tips for vocal health. The book was sold with a CD of the same title. A sequel to the book The Perfect Rehearsal was published by Shawnee Press in August 2007 followed by The Perfect Choral Workbook in November.

After working twenty years at the Turtle Creek Chorale, Seelig stepped down from the position of the conductor in 2007. The same year, The Gay and Lesbian Association of Choruses (GALA) was looking to start a program for an Artistic Director-in-Residence. When he stepped down from Turtle Creek, he was invited by GALA to apply for the program. He applied and was named the first Artist Director-in-Residence of the association. The initial tenure for the program was one year, however, after the completion of the first year, Seelig stayed on for another year. During this time, he visited 40 choruses in the United States, the United Kingdom and Canada.

After he stepped down from TCC, he was contacted by his friend Reverend Michael Piazza, who was the senior pastor at Cathedral of Hope. Piazza wanted Seelig to join him at a non-profit he had started called Hope for Peace and Justice. Seelig agreed to help him and was selected the director for the program Arts for Peace and Justice. In 2008, he founded Resounding Harmony, a mixed chorus in Dallas that performs with the sole purpose of raising money for non-profit organizations.

Seelig made his fifth appearance at the Carnegie Hall at the Shawnee Press' 70th Anniversary in 2009. In May, he guest conducted the San Francisco's Gay Men's Chorus at the Davies Symphony Hall. He also conducted the North American GALA chorus at Southbank Centre in London performing Sing for a Cure – a choral symphony commissioned in coordination with the Susan Komen for the Cure featuring Maya Angelou.

In 2009, Seelig produced An Evening of Hope at the Morton H. Meyerson Symphony Center honoring Maya Angelou on her 80th Birthday. In 2010, through Arts for Peace and Justice, he organized the first Gayther Homecoming, a gala evening of Christian music and songs following the format of Gaither Homecoming, but allowing homosexual people to perform. The original Gaither Homecoming, which started in 1991 does not allow openly homosexual people to perform. The proceeds from the gala were donated to Interfaith Peace Chapel at the COH. In Fall, Seelig served as the guest conductor of the Gay Men's Chorus of Los Angeles and the Denver Gay Men's Chorus.

=== 2011 - 2022 ===
In 2010, Seelig learned that the San Francisco Gay Men's Chorus was looking for a conductor. He applied for the job and was selected. He left his job at the Southern Methodist University and Hope for Peace and Justice and relocated to San Francisco. He started as the conductor of the SFGMC in January 2011.

As conductor of the SFGMC, he commissioned Steven Schwartz to compose a piece called Testimony inspired by the It Gets Better project. Testimony received positive reviews and The Huffington Post called it "the It Gets Better anthem." The same year, Seelig also contacted Andrew Lippa to write a five-minute piece about Harvey Milk. Excited by the project, Lippa proposed writing a complete sixty-minute show. Seelig commissioned the work and Lippa wrote I am Harvey Milk, which was premiered as part of the Harvey Milk concert in 2013 to commemorate the 35th Anniversary of SFGMC and Harvey Milk's assassination.

In 2012, Seelig discussed the idea of creating a suite for Tyler Clementi with Schwartz. The two worked together and commissioned eight composers to do eight movements of the story of Clementi. San Francisco Gay Men's Chorus premiered the suite in 2013.

Seelig was invited by the Turtle Creek Chorale to guest conduct and host the 35th anniversary concert of the chorale in 2015. In 2016, SFGMC performed Heartthrobs: Biggest Boy Band Ever directed and conducted by Seelig. The show featured pop music from the 70s and 80s to present day.

In 2016, Seelig presented a master class as part of the summer choral program at the Idyllwild Arts Summer Program.

In February 2020, Seelig conducted the Kansas Music Educators' Association All-State Mixed Choir.

=== 2024 - present ===
In 2024, Seelig came out of retirement to lead the Portland Sage Singers, a new LGBTQ+ Elders and Allies group with the mission to promote: "the value of Q+ Elders and Allies and bringing joy to our world through song, storytelling and community building."

== LGBT dispute with Best Vacations Ever ==
In 2013, Seelig and his partner Dan England were contacted by Best Vacations Ever with an offer of attending a time share seminar and getting a discounted vacation to Las Vegas. The couple decided to enroll for the seminar. According to Seelig, they were told later that the company cannot accept gay couples. Seelig posted about the dispute on his Facebook page, and it was then picked up by Towleroad and other media outlets. According to Seelig, the company responded by claiming that they allow gay couples in the seminar only if they are co-habitating and that the customer representatives Seelig spoke to misunderstood him. Seelig asked the Best Vacations Ever for a public apology, but there was no further response from the company.

== Bibliography ==
- The Perfect Blend: Seriously Fun Vocal Warm Ups (2005) ISBN 978-1592350940
- The Perfect Rehearsal: Everything You Wanted to Know About Rehearsals! (2007)
- The Perfect Choral Workbook: Everything You Need to Organize Your Choral Program (2007) ISBN 978-1592351992
- Quick Fixes: Prescriptions for Every Choral Challenge! (2008) ISBN 978-1592352463
- The Music Within: Discovering the Joy - AGAIN! One Man's Story, Everyone's Journey (2010) ISBN 978-1423476115
- The Language of Music (2015) ISBN 978-1423476139

== Discography ==
=== With Turtle Creek Chorale ===
Year	Title
1990	From the Heart
1991	When We No Longer Touch
1991	Peace
1992	Testament
1993	Requiem
1994	United We Sing
1994	A Roamin' Holiday
1994	Everything's Possible
1994	Postcards
1995	Let Music Live
1995	Family
1995	Times of the Day
1996	The Gershwin Scrapbook
1996	Simply Christmas
1997	Celebrate
1997	Reflections
1997	Twisted Turtle Tinsel
1998	Lifelong Friend
1999	Best of the Turtle Creek Chorale
1999	Psalms
2000	Personals
2000	Sing for the Cure
2000	Song of Wisdom from Old Turtle
2000	Turtle Mix
2001	Two Worlds with Buddy Shanahan
2001	Comfort and Joy
2001	Turtle Creek Chorale Recordings Sampler
2002	To A Dancing Star
2002	A Testament to Freedom
2002	One World
2003	Celestial
2004	Annie's Songs
2004	The Holy and The Holly
2004	Journey
2005	Holiday Memories
2006	Songs of Our Nation
2007	Serenade
2007	A Fond Farewell

=== With Women's Chorus of Dallas ===
Year	Title	Role
1996	Only Human	Director
1994	Our Turn	Director
1997	Change of Heart	Director
1998	In the Mood	Director
2000	American Rhapsody	Director
2002 - 2003	Seasons of Dreams	Director

=== Individually ===
Year	Title	Notes
2005	The Perfect Blend	DVD with Book
2007	The Perfect Rehearsal	DVD with Book
2007	The Perfect Choral Workbook	DVD with Book
2008	Quick Fixes	DVD with Book
