= Fricke =

Fricke is a surname. Notable people with the surname include:

- Aaron Fricke (born 1961), American gay rights activist
- Anna Fricke, American television writer and producer
- Ben Fricke (1975–2011), American football player
- Brian Fricke (born 1981), Iraq War veteran, gay rights activist
- Cosima Fricke (born 2000), Argentinian model, musician and cinematographer.
- David Fricke, senior editor of Rolling Stone magazine
- Ernst-August Fricke (1911–1943), Oberstleutnant in the Wehrmacht during World War II
- Ferdinand-Wilhelm Fricke (1863–1927), founder of the oldest rugby union club in Germany
- Florian Fricke (1944–2001), German musician
- Heinz Fricke, German conductor, Music Director of the Washington National Opera
- Hugo Fricke (1892–1972), Danish-American physicist who studied water radiolysis and invented the eponym dosimeter
- Janie Fricke (born 1947), American country music singer
- Jimmy Fricke (born 1987), American poker player
- Jobst Fricke (born 1930), German university teacher and musicologist
- John Fricke, American film historian
- Justin Fricke, (born 1989) North American Hobby horse riding champion and creator of the "rainbow double mctwist" hobby horse riding manoeuvre
- Karl Wilhelm Fricke (born 1929), German journalist
- Kathrin Fricke, the German web-artist Coldmirror
- Kevin Fricke (born 1976), American entrepreneur and fitness explorer
- Kurt Fricke (1889–1945), Admiral with the Kriegsmarine during World War II
- Olaf Fricke (born 1951), West German slalom canoeist
- Otto Fricke (born 1965), German politician
- Peter Fricke (born 1939), German television actor
- Robert Fricke (1861–1930), German mathematician
- Roman Fricke (born 1977), German high jumper
- Ron Fricke, American film director and cinematographer
- Ronald Fricke, German ichthyologist
- Rusty Fricke (born 1964), American football player
- Siegfried Fricke (born 1954), German rower, later became a politician
- Tyler Fricke (born 1994), United States Army Officer
- Walburga Fricke (born 1936), German politician
- Walter Fricke (1915–1988), German professor of theoretical astronomy and cryptanalyst in Wehrmacht during World War II
- Willi Fricke (1913–1963), German international footballer

== See also ==
- 1561 Fricke, main-belt asteroid
- Fricke v. Lynch 491 F.Supp. 381 (1980), decision in the United States District Court
- Bricker, a surname
- Fricker, a surname
- Frickley (disambiguation)
