= Cathedral of Hope =

Cathedral of Hope may refer to:

- Cathedral of Hope (Dallas), Texas (United Church of Christ, formerly Universal Fellowship of Metropolitan Community Churches)
- Cathedral of Hope (Pittsburgh) (East Liberty Presbyterian Church), Pennsylvania (Presbyterian Church USA)
