= Michael Piazza =

Michael Piazza may refer to:

- Mike Piazza, former Major League Baseball catcher
- Michael S. Piazza, author and social justice advocate
