= LGBTQ rights in Georgia =

LGBTQ rights in Georgia may refer to:

- LGBTQ rights in Georgia (country), about the country in the Caucasus region
- LGBTQ rights in Georgia (U.S. state), about one of the states that make up the United States

== See also ==
- LGBTQ topics in Georgia
