= LGBTQ history in Georgia (U.S. state) =

The state of Georgia mostly improved in its treatment of lesbian, gay, bisexual and transgender residents in the years after 1970, when LGBT residents began to openly establish events, organizations and outlets for fellow LGBT residents and increase in political empowerment.

== Prior to the 20th century ==
The state of Georgia, upon independence from the United Kingdom, retained most laws imposed under British rule, but did not explicitly retain a sodomy law from the period until 1817, when the first sodomy law in the jurisdiction's 85 years was enforced. A further amendment of the law took place in 1833, when "carnal knowledge and connection against the order of nature by man with man, or in the same unnatural manner with woman" was outlawed on force of life imprisonment with labor.

The first sodomy case in the state occurred in 1894, when Hodges v. State reached the State Supreme Court; the case of an appeal against a lower court conviction of a boy "under 14 years of age" for sodomy upon another boy resulted in a two-sentence judgement: "Judgment reversed."

== 20th century ==
In 1949, the state amended its sodomy law, reducing the compulsory life sentence to 1–10 years. The breadth of the law, however, was gradually expanded by both judicial and legislative redefinitions over the decades. The law was formally challenged in 1986 by Bowers v. Hardwick, which was taken to as high as the US Supreme Court before the court ruled against Michael Hardwick, the defendant who was arrested while performing consensual fellatio upon another male.

Ultimately, however, as a larger number of states repealed their sodomy laws through judicial or legislative action, Georgia was one of the last to do so. In 1993, Senator Ronald Slotin (D-Atlanta) unsuccessfully introduced a bill to the Senate to repeal the sodomy law, The Georgia Supreme Court struck down the state's sodomy law in Powell v. Georgia (1998), a 6-1 decision.

=== 20th century in Atlanta ===
In the meantime, LGBT life began to develop in various districts of Atlanta, including Midtown, Little Five Points, and Candler Park districts. In September 1953, 20 gay men were arrested in the Atlanta Public Library following a police stakeout, an event widely covered by the media known as the Atlanta Public Library perversion case. In 1969, the police raid a screening of the film Lonesome Cowboys, targeting "known homosexuals". In 1971, the first Atlanta Gay Pride parade was organized by the Georgia Gay Liberation Front, and was held between Peachtree Street to Piedmont Park. In 1972, the first Atlanta area Metropolitan Community Church congregation was established.

In 1974, local activist Bill Smith founded the Atlanta Barb, the state's first gay newspaper. In 1976, the Atlanta Gay Center was first opened. In 1978, the Southern Baptist Convention's hosting of a speaking engagement by anti-gay activist Anita Bryant at the Georgia World Congress center drew a rally of over 4,000.

In 1983, the Atlanta Campaign for Human Rights (now Georgia Equality) was established. In 1985, the first officially LGBT-welcoming synagogue, Congregation Bet Haverim (Reconstructionist), opened.

In 1988, Southern Voice was established. In 1992, Emory University opened its Gay and Lesbian Student Life office. The Atlanta Gay and Lesbian Visitors Center was opened in 1996, opening Atlanta's Olympics to LGBT tourists.

=== Government recognition and participation ===
The history of government recognition of LGBT people in Georgia began in 1972. That year, Atlanta mayor Sam Massell appointed Charlie St. John, an archivist and journalist from the Atlanta Journal-Constitution (where he was fired for his activities by 1973), to his Community Relations Commission, becoming the first LGBT liaison in Atlanta city government. In 1982, an official proclamation for Pride was issued by the Atlanta city government, but it was not signed by Mayor Andrew Young; but in 1984, Young inaugurated the first "Gay and Lesbian Civil Rights Day". In 1988, Mayor Maynard Jackson became the first mayor of Atlanta to attend Pride. In 1993, Fulton County's government became the first county in the state to issue an official Pride proclamation, joining the city of Atlanta in doing so.

In 1997, Cathy Woolard became the first openly gay politician elected to the Atlanta city council.

== Post-Powell ==
In the years since, legal victories for lesbian, gay, bisexual and transgender residents of Georgia have been few and far between, while historic firsts have taken place more frequently outside of the Atlanta metropolitan area. In 2000, the Atlanta Gay Center was closed due to lack of funding. In 2005, Wesley Chenault opened an exhibit titled The Unspoken Past: Atlanta Lesbian and Gay History, 1940–1970. In 2010, a couple made state headlines for being the first gay couple allowed to dance at a Bleckley County High School prom.

=== Governmental participation ===
In 2000, Karla Drenner became the first openly gay member of the Georgia House of Representatives; in 2011, already-elected House member Rashad Taylor came out, becoming the first-openly-gay-male member of the Georgia House of Representatives. In 2001, Cathy Woolard was elected the first openly gay City Council President of Atlanta.

In 2010, Simone Bell became the first openly lesbian African American woman to be elected to the Georgia General Assembly.

=== Government recognition ===
The 2004 passage of a constitutional ban on same-sex marriage hindered the recognition of same-sex relationships by the state government.

In 2005, the General Assembly passed a law which legalized the ability of counties to establish domestic partnership benefits for gay and lesbian county workers. The City of Atlanta achieved a victory in 1997 when the Georgia Supreme Court, in City of Atlanta v. Morgan ruled domestic partnership registration by the City to be legal, but it took until 1999, when the Georgia Supreme Court ruled against Insurance Commissioner John Oxendine for blocking the city's provision of domestic partnership benefits to city workers for the provisions to commence. In 2003, Fulton County became the first county to pass domestic partnership registration for county residents and municipal employees in same-sex relationships. On December 6, 2007, the city-county government of Athens, Georgia, legalized health benefits for unmarried domestic partners.

== Notable LGBT Georgians ==
- Air Force Tsgt. Leonard Matlovich (born in Savannah), became the first American military servicemember to disclose himself as homosexual.
- Alice Walker (born in Eastman), writer, author of The Color Purple
- Michael S. Piazza, senior pastor of Virginia-Highland Church in Atlanta, Georgia, served as senior pastor and dean of the Cathedral of Hope from 1987 to 2005
- Karla Drenner, first ever openly gay member of the Georgia General Assembly
- Roy Simmons (born in Savannah), former American football player who played offensive lineman for the New York Giants and then with the Washington Redskins during Super Bowl XVIII in 1984. Came out of the closet as gay on The Phil Donahue Show in 1992.
- Marine Cpl. Brian Fricke (born in Albany), Iraq War veteran and SLDN board member.
- Daniel A. Helminiak, Catholic queer theologian, professor in the department of humanistic and transpersonal psychology at the University of West Georgia in Carrollton.
- Alan Ball (born in Atlanta), screenwriter for American Beauty and Towelhead, creator, writer and producer of the HBO drama series Six Feet Under and True Blood.
- Michael Stipe (born in Decatur), singer-songwriter for R.E.M.
- Crawford Barton, photographer, best known for documenting the blooming of the openly gay culture in San Francisco from the late 1960s into the 1980s.
- Amy Ray (born in Decatur) and Emily Saliers, members of folk band Indigo Girls, met at Laurel Ridge Elementary School and formed band there
- Benjamin Smoke (born in Atlanta), frontman for Smoke.
- Lawrence D. Mass (born in Macon), physician and writer, co-founder of Gay Men's Health Crisis, wrote the first press reports on the epidemic that later became known as AIDS.
- RuPaul, drag performer, singer-songwriter and actor, started out in Atlanta clubs in the 1980s and 1990s
- Anthony Goicolea (born in Atlanta), fine-art photographer
- Joe Phillips (born in Atlanta), artist
- Chris Glaser, former Interim Pastor of Christ Covenant MCC in Decatur, Georgia, activist in the movement for full inclusion of LGBT Christians in the Presbyterian Church (U.S.A.)
- Thomas Roberts, former CNN anchor and Atlanta resident
- Baton Bob (real name Bob Jameson), costumed street performer based in Atlanta
- Lil Nas X (born in Lithia Springs), Grammy Award-winning singer-songwriter, rapper, and media personality

== See also ==
- LGBT rights in Georgia (U.S. state)
