= John Lowrie =

John Lowrie may refer to:

- John Patrick Lowrie, American actor, musician and author
- John Cameron Lowrie, American Presbyterian missionary in India
