= Atlanta Public Library perversion case =

1953 raid

The Atlanta Public Library perversion case was a series of arrests made in September 1953 at the Atlanta Central Library in Atlanta, Georgia, United States. The Atlanta Police Department, at the request of library officials, had set up a stakeout in the library's men's restroom via a one-way mirror and arrested 20 people on charges of sodomy over a period of 8 days. The incident was widely covered in the local newspapers.

== History ==
In September 1953, members of the Atlanta Police Department's vice squad set up a stakeout at the Atlanta Central Library in downtown Atlanta at the request of library officials. The library's restrooms were considered "tea rooms" in Atlanta's gay community, places where gay men met to have sexual intercourse. On September 4, the police arrested two men for sodomy after witnessing them perform fellatio. In total, 20 men were arrested over the course of 8 days for similar charges. The local newspapers, including The Atlanta Journal and The Atlanta Constitution, both widely covered the incident, and the addresses, names, and places of employment of the 20 men were published. 19 of the men lost their jobs following the incident. The name of the incident, "The Atlanta Public Library perversion case", was coined by The Atlanta Constitution.

Charges against the 20 men were brought before a Fulton County grand jury on September 15. In December, they appeared before the county's superior court, with all pleading guilty. James MacKay, who would later serve as a Representative from Georgia, spoke on behalf of the accused. The presiding judge accepted the guilty pleas, imposed fines of up to $200, and sentenced them to between 2 and 3 years in prison, though all sentences were eventually suspended or probated. Additionally, all men were barred from ever visiting the Atlanta Public Library again, several were required to leave Atlanta (with several of these men required to live with family members), and many had to report to church officials. Overall, the sentencing was viewed as lenient.

This incident occurred during the Lavender Scare, a movement within the federal government targeting homosexual government employees. At the same time in Atlanta, similar police events occurred in Piedmont Park, and The Atlanta Constitution editor Ralph McGill called for "tougher sex crimes legislation."

== See also ==
- 1950s in LGBTQ rights
- Atlanta Eagle police raid
- LGBTQ history in Georgia (U.S. state)
- Sodomy laws in the United States

== Bibliography ==
- Chenault, Wesley; Braukman, Stacy (2008). Gay and Lesbian Atlanta. Arcadia Publishing. ISBN 978-0-7385-5377-1 – via Google Books.
- Howard, John (1997). Howard, John (ed.). Carryin' On in the Lesbian and Gay South. New York University Press. ISBN 978-0-8147-3513-8 – via Google Books.
- Pugh, Tison, ed. (2020). Queering the South on Screen. University of Georgia Press. ISBN 978-0-8203-5653-2 – via Google Books.
- Sylvestre, Berlin (August 2, 2018). "From Whence We Came: Our LGBTQ ATL History". The Georgia Voice.
