= Frickley (disambiguation) =

Frickley is a village in South Yorkshire, England.

Frickley may refer to:

- Frickley railway station, South Yorkshire, England
- Frickley Colliery, near South Elmsall, West Yorkshire, England
- Frickley Colliery Brass Band, West Yorkshire, England
- Frickley Athletic F.C., a football club that grew out of the colliery

== See also ==
- Fricker
- Fricke
