= East Liberty Presbyterian Church =

Coordinates: 40°27′39.7″N 79°55′32.2″W

- (Cathedral of Hope)
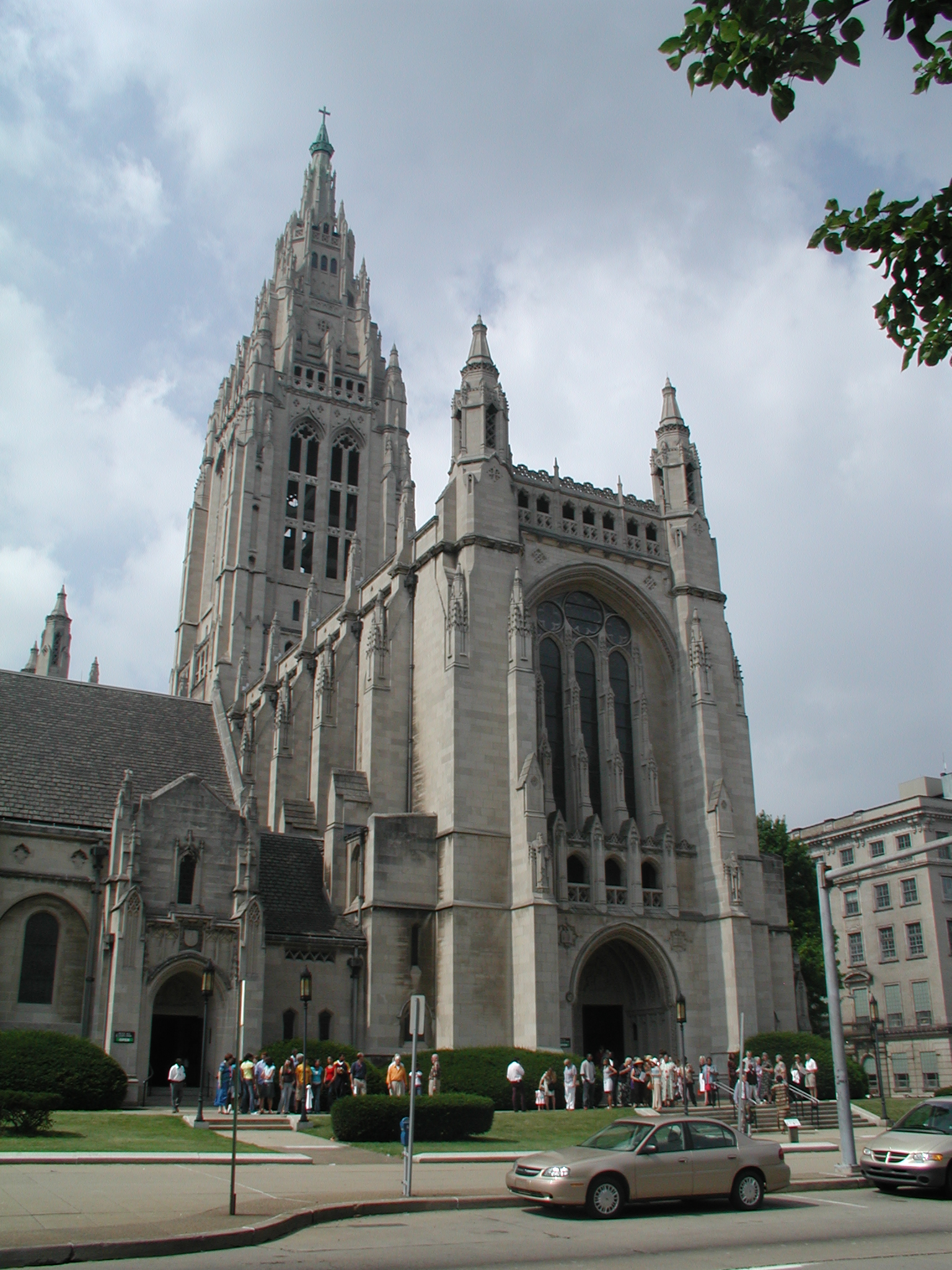
- View from Penn Avenue
- East Liberty Presbyterian Church
- Location: East Liberty Neighborhood Pittsburgh, PA
- Country: United States
- Denomination: Presbyterian Church (USA)
- Website: www.ELPC.church

History
- Founded: 1819
- Dedicated: 1935

Architecture
- Architect: Ralph Adams Cram
- Style: Gothic Revival

Clergy
- Pastor(s): Rev. Dr. Michael Diaz, Rev. BJ Woodworth

Pittsburgh Landmark – PHLF
- Designated: 1969

East Liberty Presbyterian Church, sometimes referred to as the Cathedral of Hope, is in the East Liberty neighborhood of the East End of Pittsburgh, Pennsylvania, United States. The current building is the fifth church building to occupy the site; the first was in 1819. It occupies an entire city block.

== History ==
The congregation of the East Liberty Presbyterian Church was founded in 1819. The land on which the present church stands was donated by Jacob and Barbara Negley. An acre-and-a-half site, the congregation's first building was a brick school and meeting house of forty-four square feet. The first pastor of the congregation was the Reverend W.B. McIlvaine, who was called as pastor in 1829. His ministry of four decades began with his ordination and installation in April 1830.

The pastorate of Rev. McIlvaine saw 622 members added to the church, spurring plans for a larger church building. In 1847 Mrs. Negley, now a widow, donated an additional tract of land that includes the current South Highland Avenue frontage. Three thousand dollars was raised and the second church, measuring 70 by 50 feet and seating about 400, was erected. The Pennsylvania Railroad extension into Pittsburgh in 1853 caused the Village of East Liberty's population to grow. Eventually, the second church proved too small and discussions began again on the construction of a third building. The building of the third church was delayed by the Civil War, but in 1862, $13,000 was raised and the new church completed by 1864 at a total cost of $23,000.

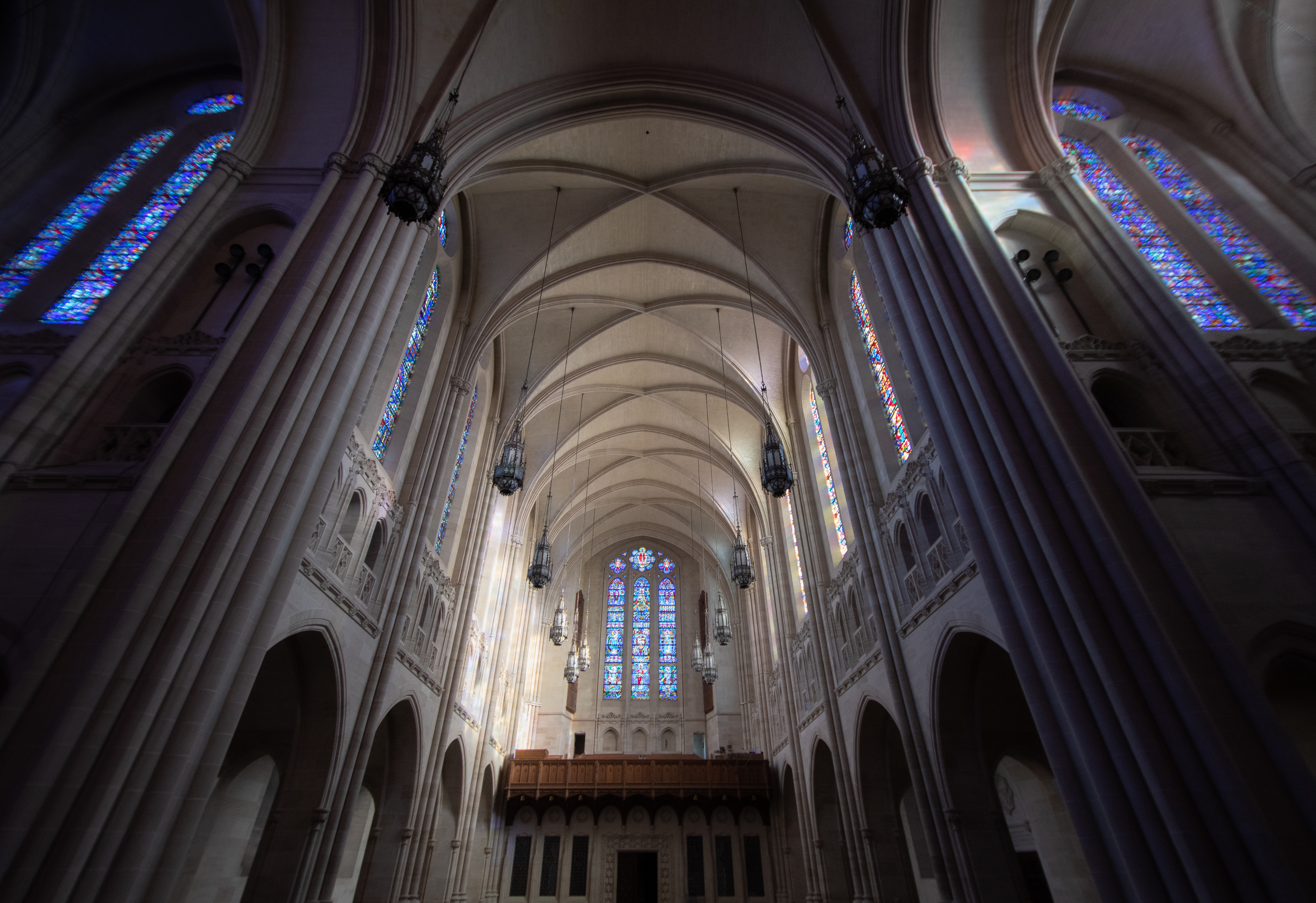
West View of the Crossing

In 1865, the church called an associate, the Rev. John Gillespie, a native of Scotland and graduate of the Western Theological Seminary. When Rev. McIlvaine retired in 1870, Gillespie assumed the role of pastor. Gillespie's ministry lasted 12 years. In 1882, the Reverend Benjamin L. Agnew, of Philadelphia, was called to succeed Gillespie, but resigned after sixteen months to accept another call in Philadelphia. In 1884, the church called the Reverend J.P.E. Kumler, of Cincinnati. The congregation grew again under Kumler's leadership and the congregation began to consider a fourth, and larger, church building. The fourth church was begun in 1887 and completed within a year.

In 1902, the Rev. Frank W. Sneed succeeded Kumler and served until 1920, when he resigned citing failing health. A vacancy of a year occurred until the Reverend Stuart Nye Hutchison was called as pastor in April 1921. In 1918, when the congregation observed its one-hundredth anniversary, Andrew William Mellon and Richard Beatty Mellon, the grandsons of Jacob and Barbara Negley donated to the East Liberty congregation the plot of land on Whitfield Street. This final donation of land brought the entire square of East Liberty's center into church possession, which would later be filled with a fifth church, funded by Richard Beatty Mellon and Jennie King Mellon and in memory of their mothers.

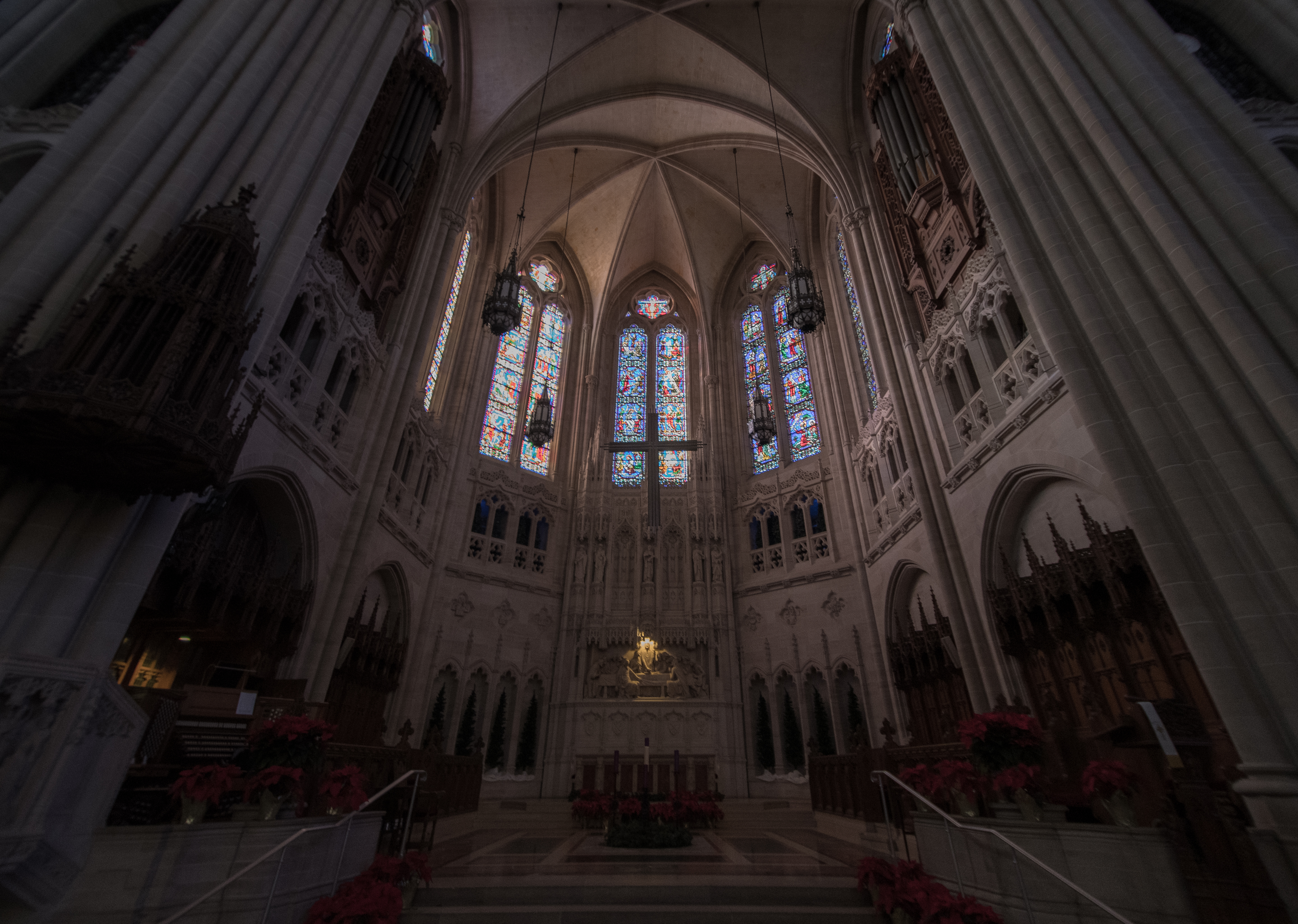
The Sanctuary Chancel

== Beliefs ==
=== Marriage ===
The church has an inclusive vision and celebrates both opposite-sex marriages and same-sex marriages. <

== The present building ==
The current church, designed by Ralph Adams Cram, is the fifth on its site. Construction began in 1931 and completed in 1935, funded entirely by Richard Beatty Mellon and his wife, Jennie King Mellon, in memory of their mothers, Sarah Jane Negley Mellon and Sarah Cordelia Smith King. Cram was most pleased with the result, calling it his magnum opus. Cram wrote in 1935, "Seldom in the case of great churches are the architects permitted to see their highest ideals carried out after a complete and definitive fashion. Here the donors had a vision of adequacy and completeness...it is doubtful if there is anywhere in this country a church of similar magnitude where every detail of utility and artistic quality has been achieved in so full a degree."

=== Artists and craftsmen of the 1935 church ===
Architects

- Cram and Ferguson, Boston, Mass.

Construction Engineers

- James L. Stuart
- Alexander R. Reed
- Kenneth F. Craft
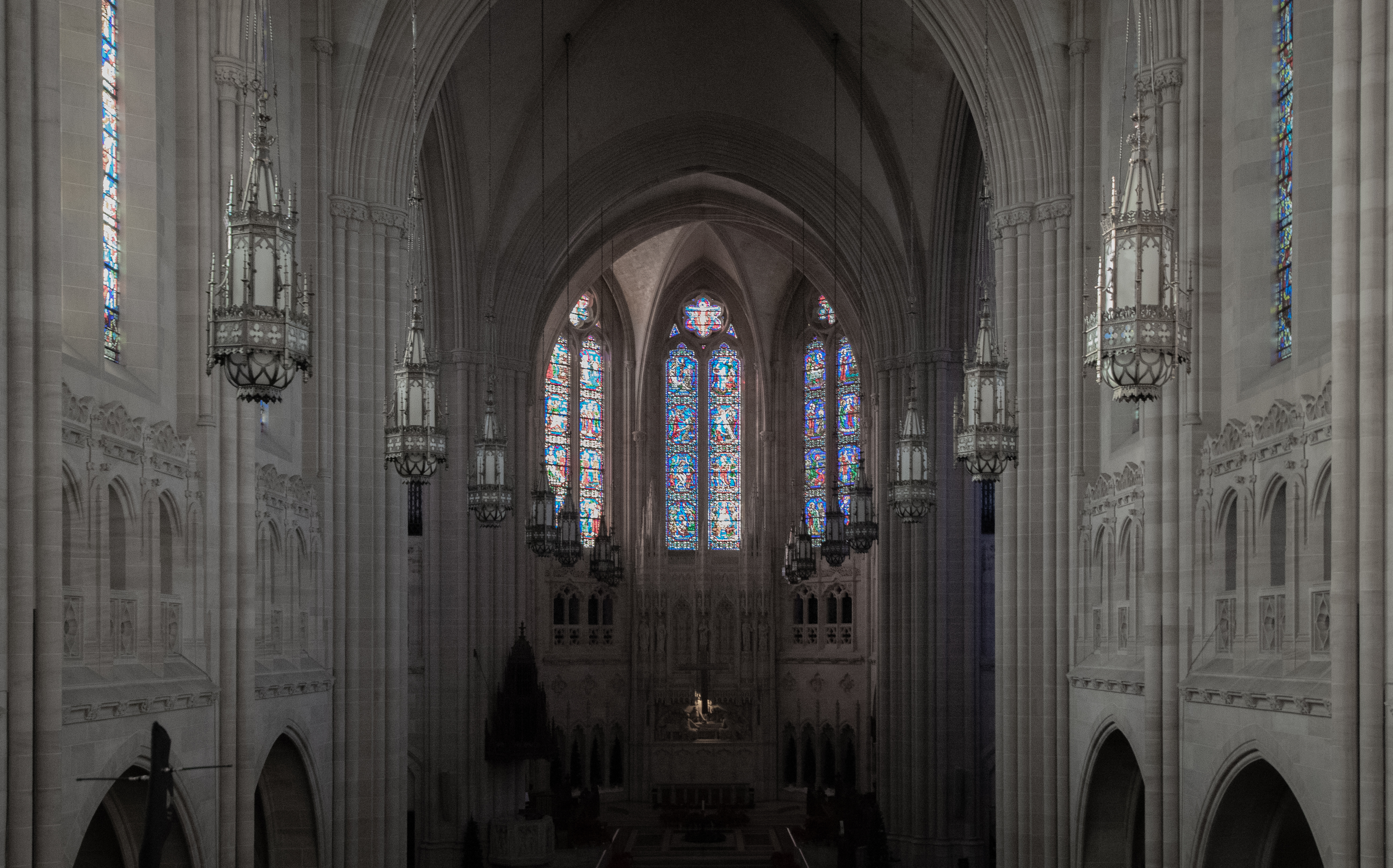
  Nave from the Gallery

Sculptors and Modelers

- John Angel, New York, NY
- William F. Ross Company, East Cambridge, Mass.
- Irving and Casson - A.H. Davenport Company, Boston, Mass.

Stained Glass

- Charles J. Connick, Boston, Mass.
- Reynolds, Francis and Rohnstock, Boston, Mass.
- Wilbur H. Burnham, Boston, Mass.
- Howard G. Wilbert, Pittsburgh, Penna.
- Henry Lee Willet, Philadelphia, Penna.
- Oliver Smith, Philadelphia, Penna.
- The D'Ascenzo Studios, Philadelphia, Penna.
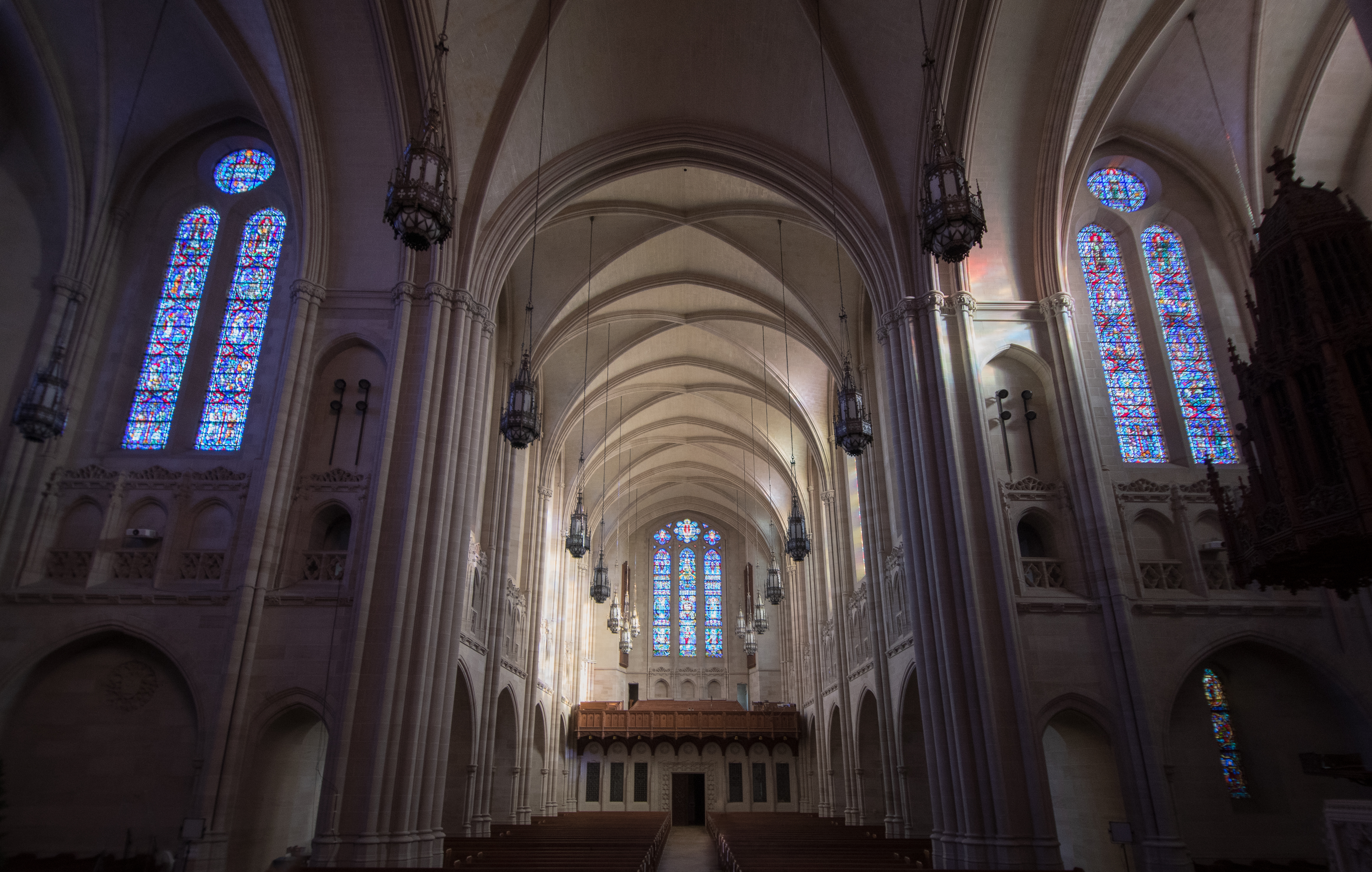
  West View of Nave

Stone Carvers

- George Brown and Company, Newark, N.J.
- Sichi and Fanfani, Washington, D.C.

Wood Workers

- Alexander Howie, Incorporated, Cleveland, Ohio
- R.E. Logan and Company, Pittsburgh, Penna.
- Matthews Brothers Company, Bloomington, Ind.
- Rockwood-Alabama Stone Company, Russelville, Ala.

Metal Workers

- Edward F. Caldwell and Company, New York, N.Y.

=== Organs ===
The original pipe organ in the church was also a gift of Richard Mellon and was built as Opus #884 by the Boston firm of Æolian-Skinner. The organ comprised eight divisions, including a six-rank string organ. It contained 6,944 pipes, a harp, and chimes. In 1972–73, the instrument was cleaned, and improvements were made to the blowers. Over the following two years, revoicing work was done on several reed and principal stops by J. David Burger. Additions in the 1970s included two significant Memorial Stops. The first being the State Trumpet and the second being the Mounted Cornet. In 2007, the Indianapolis organ building firm of Goulding & Wood, Inc. installed a new organ composed of approximately 60% new pipework and 40% from the original organ. The instrument now contains 120 ranks, with restoration work still to be done on the two antiphonal divisions in the rear gallery.

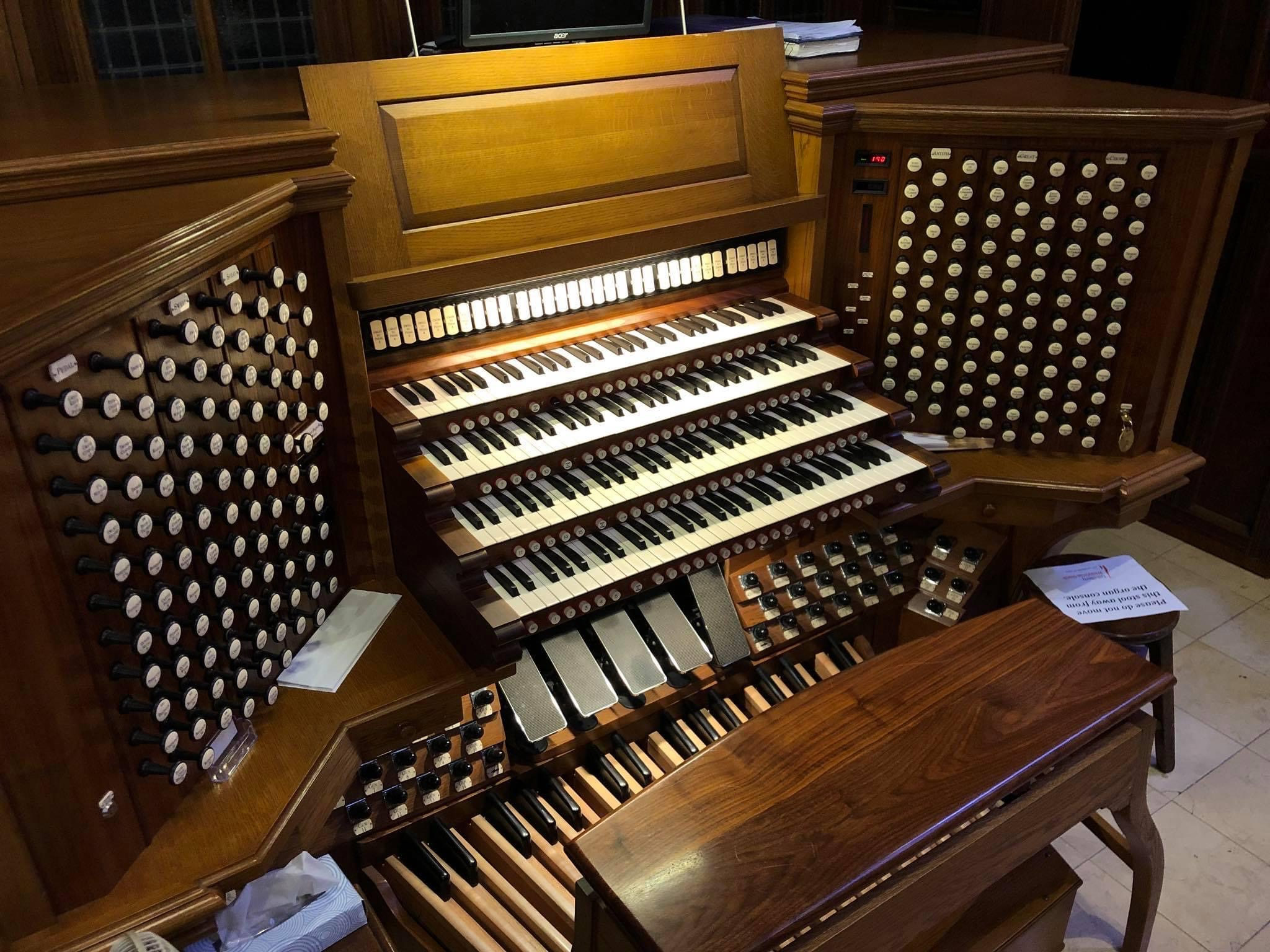
The 2007 Goulding & Wood Console

The first organ in the chapel was built by the Austin Organ Company of Hartford, CT. This instrument had originally been installed in the fourth East Liberty building in 1919, a gift of Mrs. W.M. McKelvy, C. Lockhart McKelvy, and John E. McKelvy. The instrument consisted of sixty-three stops played by a four-manual console. By 1970, consideration was given whether to restore this instrument or purchase a new one. After much deliberation, a new pipe organ was purchased from the Austin Organ Company and installed in February 1973. The new, and current, Austin is a three manual instrument of 36 ranks and played by a three-manual console. Notably, the organ case predates the 1919 Austin organ and is likely that of the 1888 organ built by Frank Roosevelt for the East Liberty Presbyterian congregation.

=== Art and architecture ===
==== Penn Avenue entrance ====
The Penn Avenue main entrance carvings represent the City of God (left) and the Tower of David (right).

==== Narthex ====
The narthex ceiling is copied from a model found in Cambridge University, England. The inner doors from narthex to nave are English oak. The windows in the south wall depict angels holding instruments of praise and the Scriptures. The windows, from the studios of Reynolds, Francis and Rohnstock, form a glass screen between the narthex and the nave. Within them is found the following symbols: chrysanthemum, thistle, star, fleur-de-lis, rose, and finally a budded cross. Th rose window above the west entrance is also by Reynolds, Francis and Rohnstock. The two windows on the north side of the narthex are by Howard G. Wilbert. The exterior doors of the main entrance are English oak; the interior doors are Siamese teak and weigh four tons.

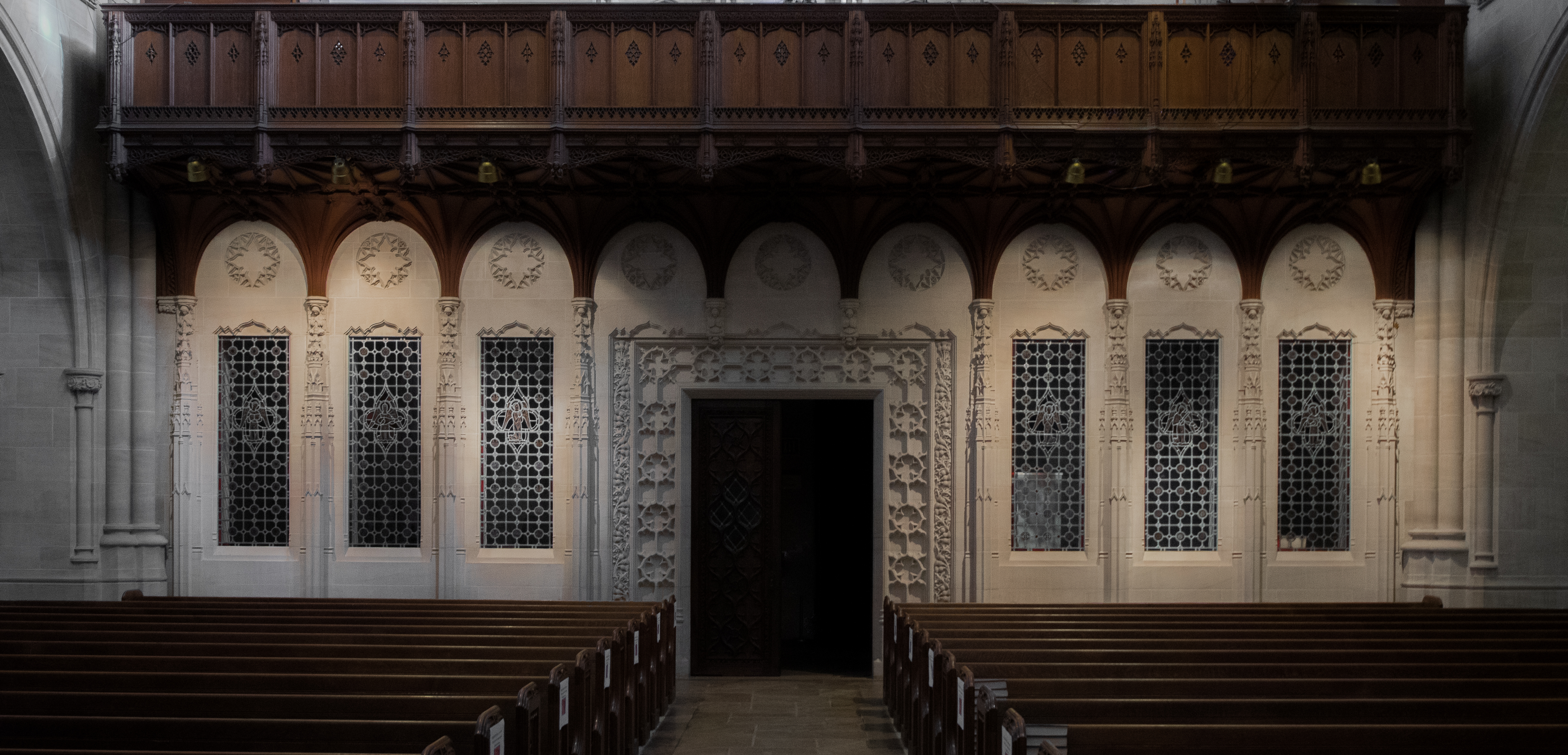
Narthex Wall

==== Clerestory windows ====
The windows of the clerestory are by Charles J. Connick of Boston, Massachusetts. There are ten clerestory windows in two groups. The windows on the east side of the nave depict Old Testament scenes while the windows on the west side depict New Testament scenes.

==== Stained glass in the transepts ====
The large rose window in the east transept, the two small rose windows above the chancel organ cases, and the two small rose windows in each transept are by the D'Ascenzo Studios of Philadelphia. The large window depicts the Revelation 21; the figure of a woman representing the Holy City, the New Jerusalem.

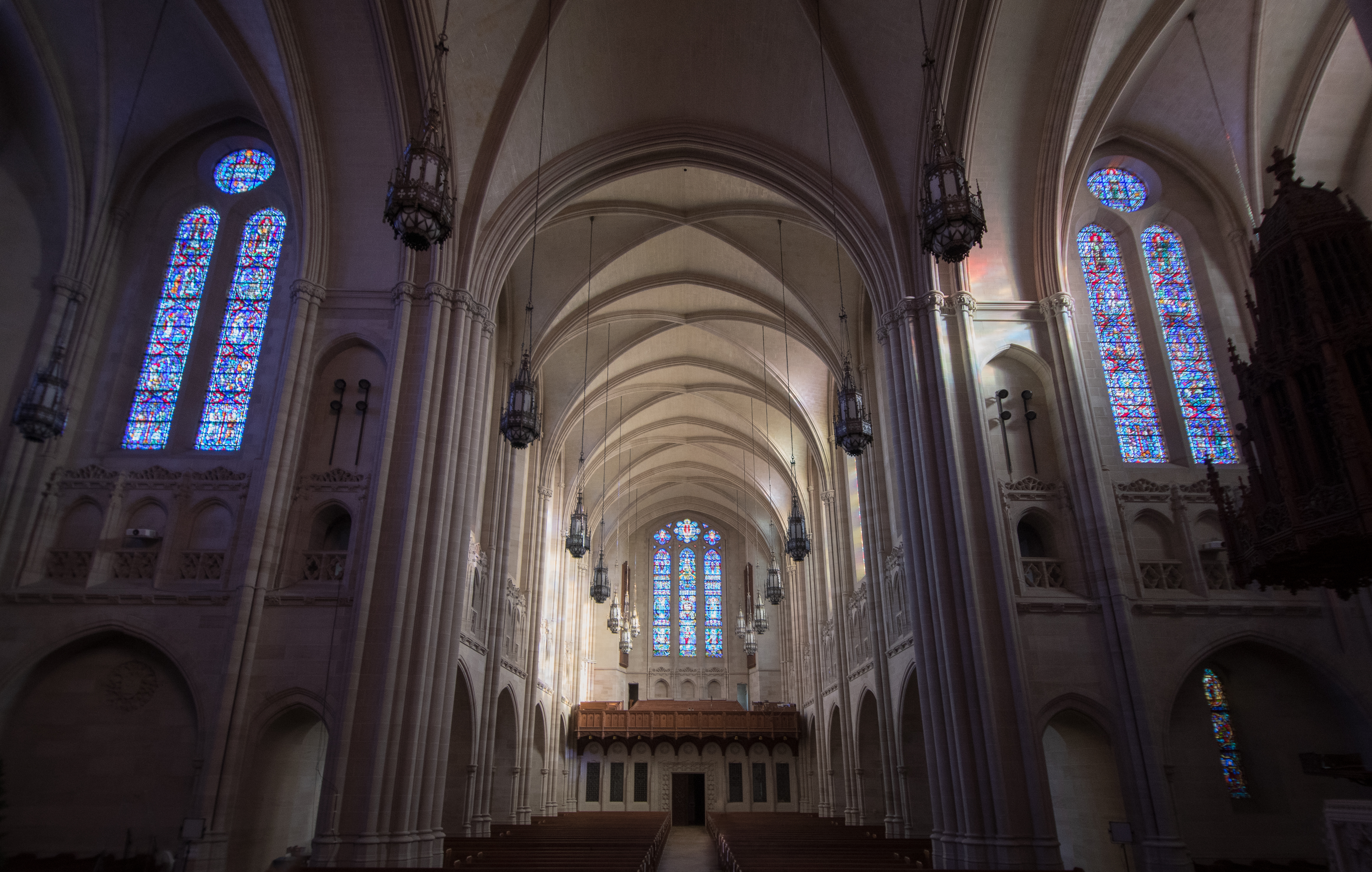
West View of Nave

The American Presbyterian History Window was designed by Henry Lee Willett and touches on nearly three centuries of Presbyterian history. The portrayals include Frances Makemie, William Tennent, Samuel Davies, John Witherspoon, John Cameron Lowrie, David Brainerd, Sheldon Jackson, John Joyce, Samuel Findley, Charles Hodge, Thomas Jonathan Jackson, and Robert Elliott Speer. By 2021, the church was considering the removal of the Thomas Jonathan Jackson panel due to his Confederate infamy and affiliation. By March 2023, the image of Stonewall Jackson had been removed from the American Presbyterian History Window. It has been replaced by deep blue glass.

A single lancet panel, beneath the American Presbyterian History Window, is by Oliver Smith Studios. This window shows three scenes: the Haystack Prayer Meeting (considered the beginning of American Foreign Missions), John Eliot (Puritan Missionary), and Benjamin Franklin's Prayer in the Continental Congress.

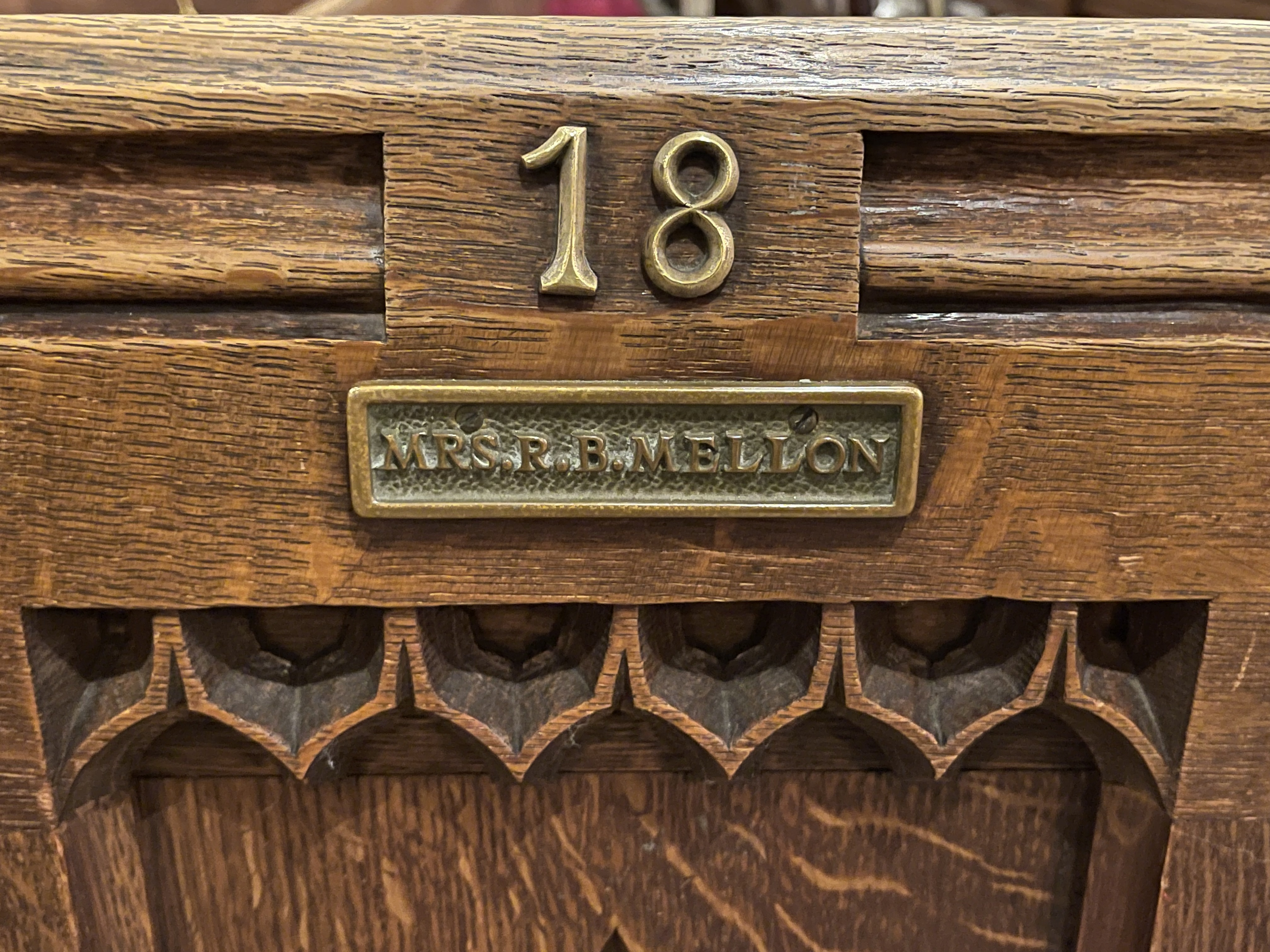
Mellon Pew at ELPC

==== Sculpture in the transepts ====
The Mellon coat-of-arms is mounted on the south wall of the east transept. A brief history of the East Liberty Presbyterian Church is also here inscribed, documenting the congregation's gratitude to the Mellons for their gift of the building. Five Christian virtues are carved as symbols on the west wall of the east transept on shields: Charity (a sheep), Wisdom (a serpent), Faith (a chalice and cross), Chastity (a phoenix), and Patience (a yoked ox). The shield of the Presbyterian Church is carved on the east wall of the nave.

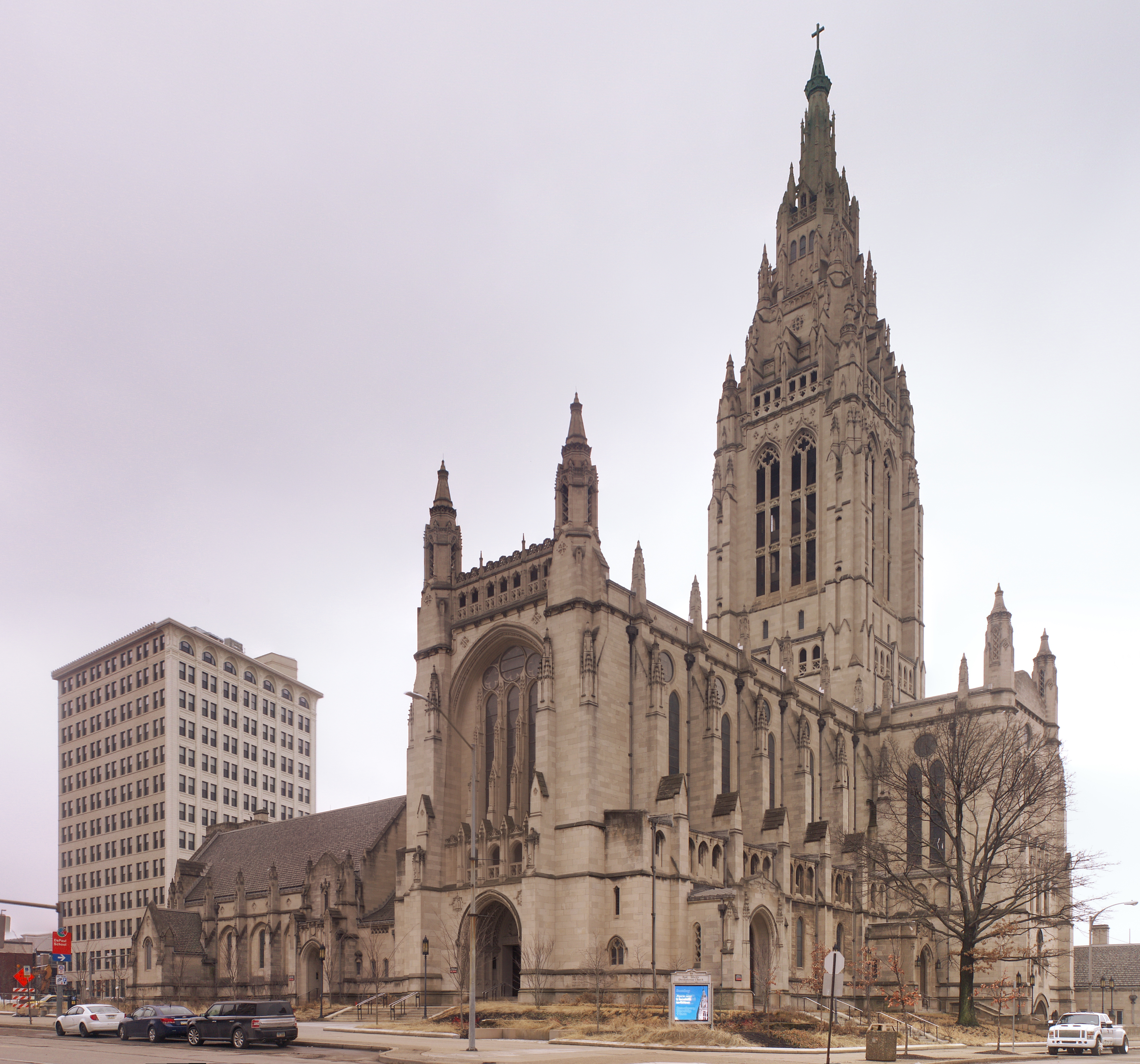
East Liberty Presbyterian Church, Pittsburgh, 2015-03-11

==== Stained glass in the chancel ====
The chancel windows were designed by Wilbur Herbert Burnham of Boston, Massachusetts. The windows depict scenes of the life of Christ from the entry into Jerusalem to the Ascension. These scenes are purposefully not placed chronologically so that they cannot be viewed within the sequence of events as found in Gospel accounts. Four small rose windows highlight the importance of music in worship and portray King David (Psalmist), Giovanni Pierluigi Palestrina, Pope Gregory I (Gregorian chant), and Johann Sebastian Bach.

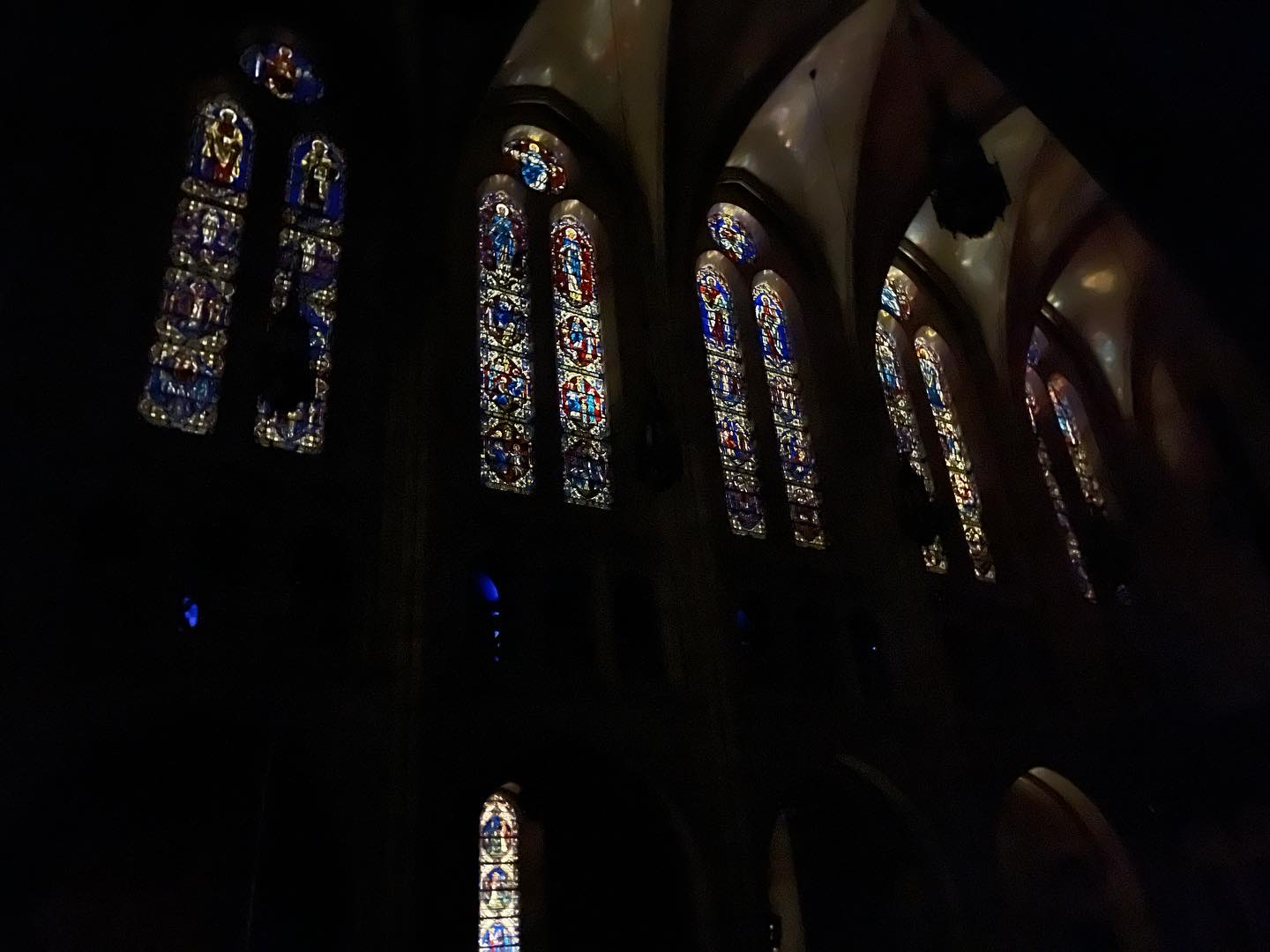
Stained glass

==== Sculpture in the chancel ====
A "sounding board" is mounted above the pulpit, which served, prior to modern microphone and speaker systems, to project the preacher's voice into the nave. The imposing reredos is constructed of Alabama limestone. The Last Supper, carved by John Angel, is regarded as one of the two outstanding achievements of his career (the other being the bronze doors of St. Patrick's Cathedral in New York City). The scene was carved from a twenty-two-ton rectangular block of Hauteville marble.

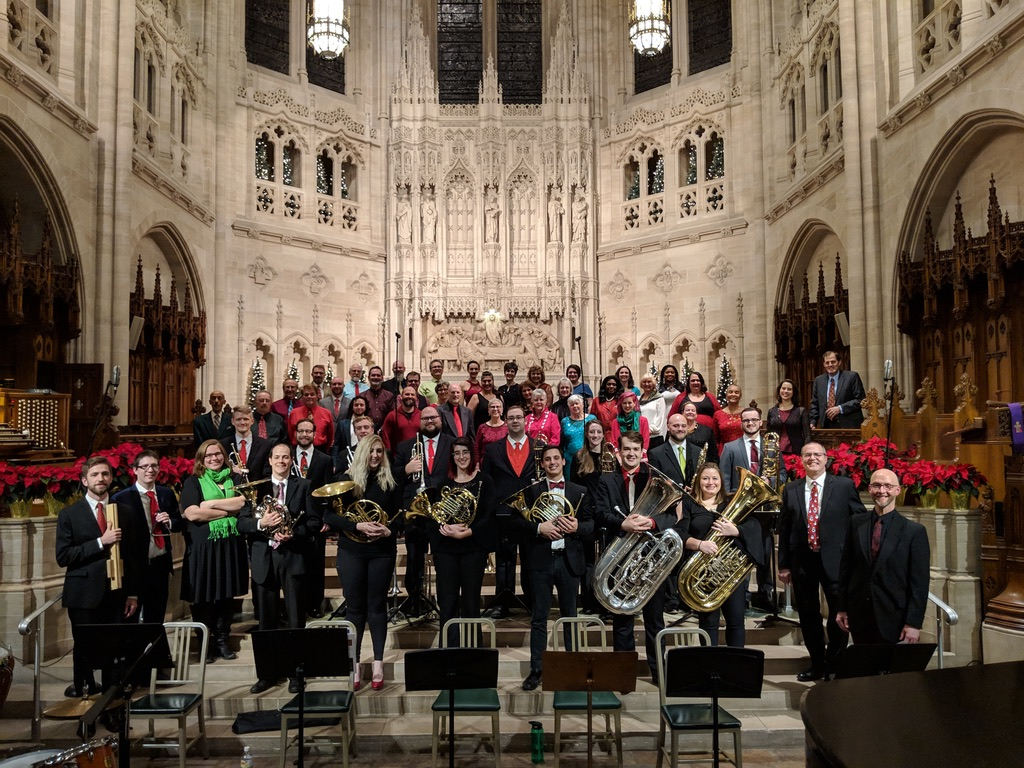
Christmas concert

Elsewhere, the chancel features several types of marble. The red marble of the Communion Table was imported from Algeria. The chancel floor, formed into a geometrical design, is made of Hauteville marble from France, French Antique Rogue, Swiss Cipolin, Statuary White, Greek Verde Antique, Sarrancolin West, Campan Rubane, Red Levanto, Vermont Verde Antique and Swedish Green.

==== The Tower Bell ====
The central tower of the church is home to a bell cast by the Meneely Bell Foundry of Troy, NY. Weighing 2,760 pounds, it was donated by Barbara Negley in 1867. Its inscription reads: "Donated to the First Presbyterian Church of East Liberty by Mrs. B. A. Negley, in the 89th year of her age. Pastors - Rev. William B. McIlvaine, Rev. John Gillespie." Notable occasions on which the bell was rung include the Centennial of the signing of the Declaration of Independence, the passing of the funeral train of Resident McKinley, and during the World War as a call to prayer.

==== Exterior lighting ====
As part of the church's 200th anniversary celebration, new exterior lighting was installed to highlight Ralph Adams Cram's architectural masterpiece. The final phase of this project was to illuminate the tower. The new tower lighting was debuted on May 4, 2019.

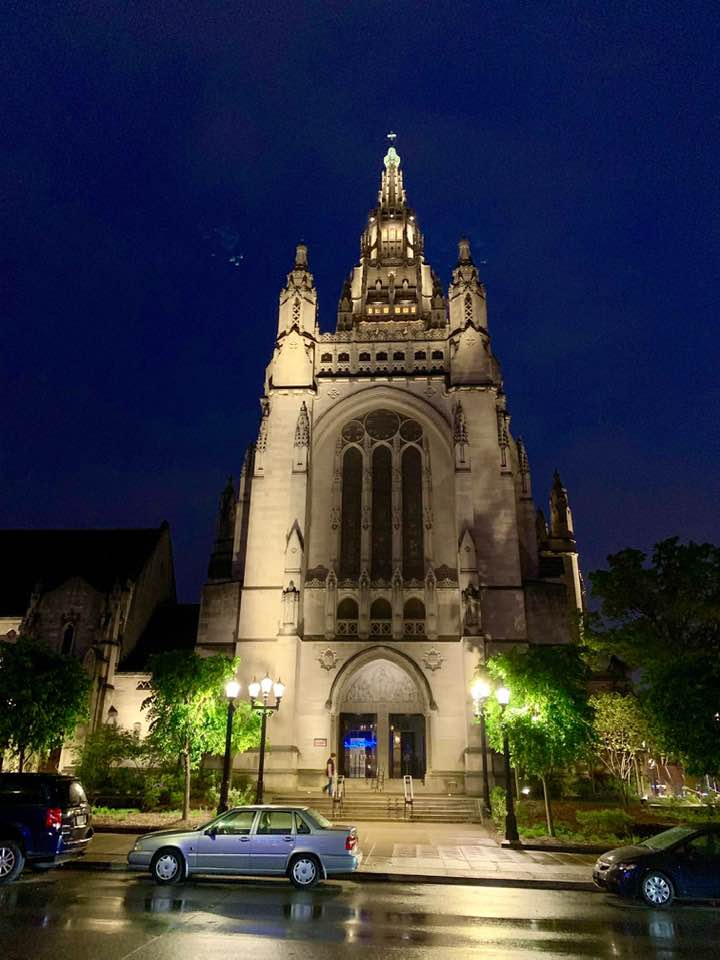
New exterior lighting as viewed from Penn Avenue.

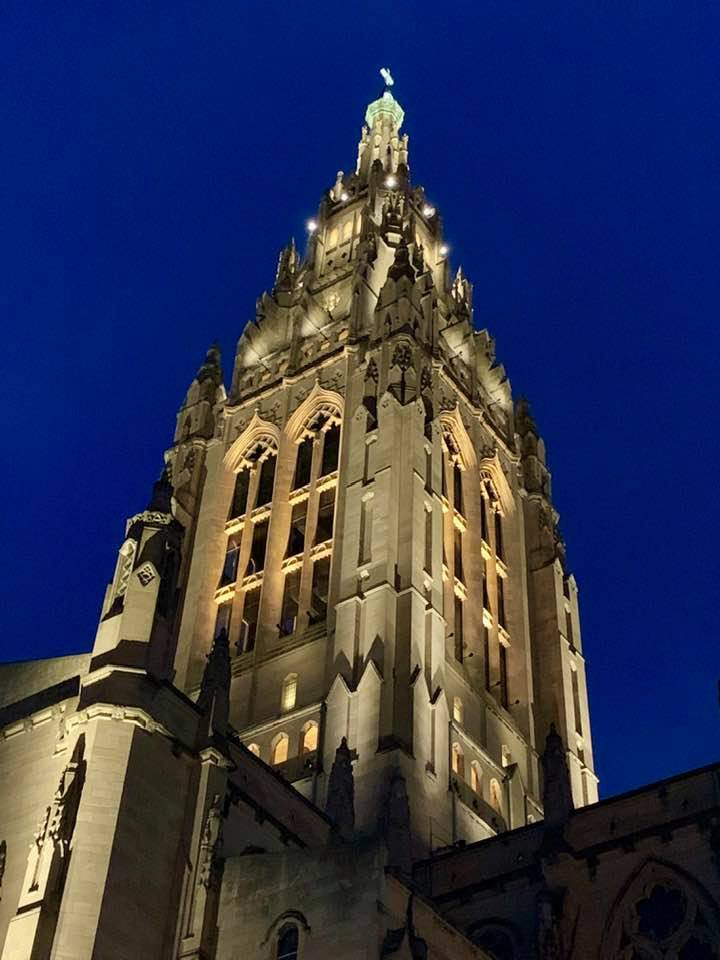
New exterior lighting as viewed from Whitfield Street.

=== Trinity Chapel ===
Following the deaths of Richard Beatty and Jennie King Mellon in 1942, the Church Session voted to construct to them a memorial which became Trinity Chapel. The entrance to the chapel is half-way down the east aisle and marked, above the doorway, with a carved shield of the Trinity. The doors are Siamese teak. The interior carvings are inspired by Peter Paul Rubens and the windows by Wilbur H. Burnham. The chapel, designed as well by Cram, was erected at a cost of $120,000 and dedicated January 15, 1944.

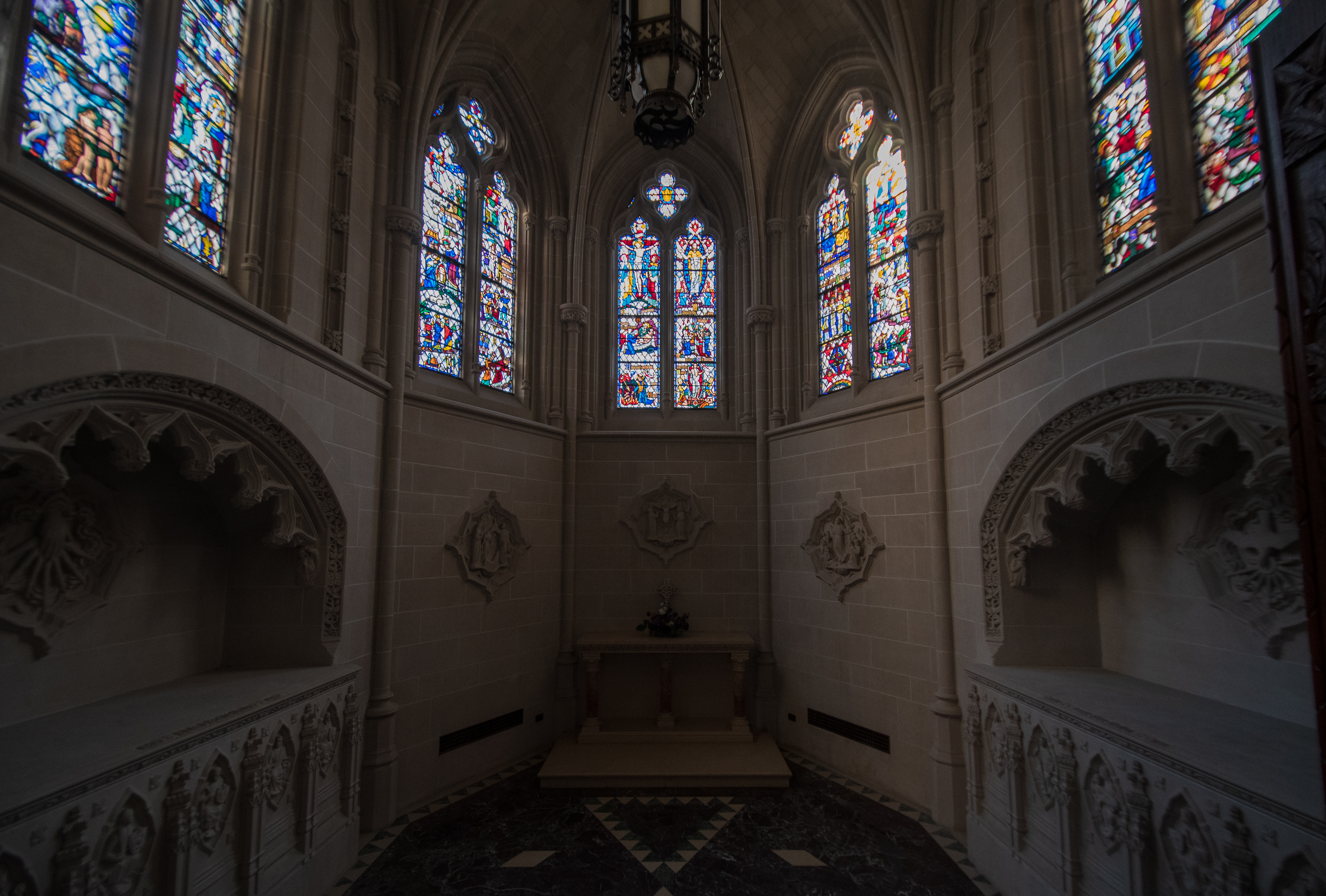
Trinity Chapel

=== Wayfarers' Chapel ===
Desiring to be conscious of those suffering the economic repercussions of the 1929 Great Depression, the congregation intended to use the Wayfarers' Chapel (located at the corner of Baum and Whitfield) for a ministry of social service. However, by the time the church was completed in 1935, the worst of the Great Depression was over, and the Wayfarers' Chapel did not fulfill its intended use until many years later. Three windows in the chapel's interior are designed by Howard G. Wilbert and depict the Great Seal of the United States of America, The Crucifixion, and an angel holding the Gospel.

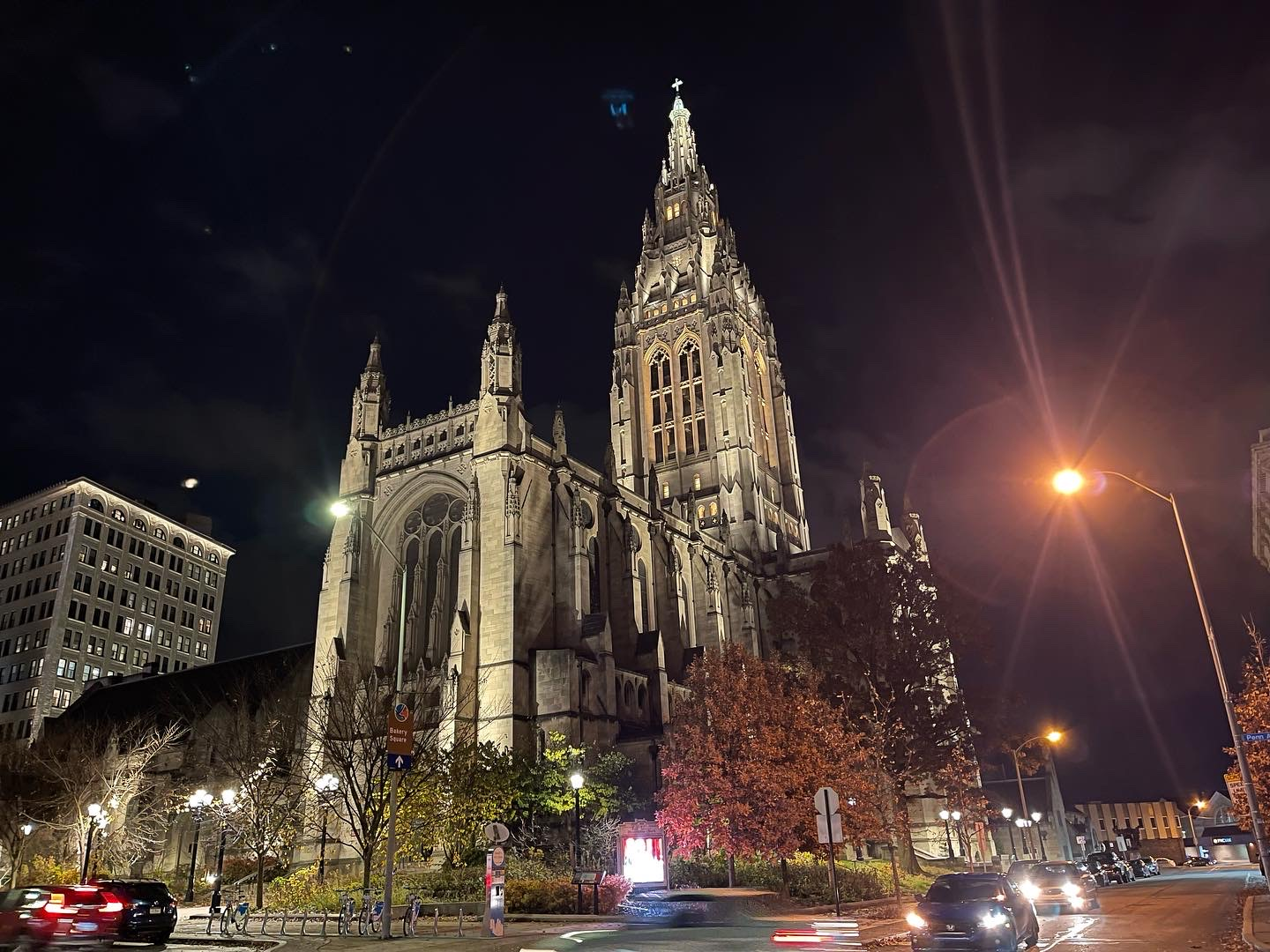
Building lit up at night

=== The Garth ===
The term "garth" comes from the Old English word "heard," or "yard." In the chapel side wall of the garth can be seen the cornerstones of the congregation's previous three church buildings from 1848, 1864, and 1887. The four sandstone columns, set in the northeast corner, are from the 1887 church. As a reminder that the land of the Garth was once used as graveyard, the tombstone of John Spahr is erected. The Garth includes a pulpit and is used frequently by the church for services and other events.

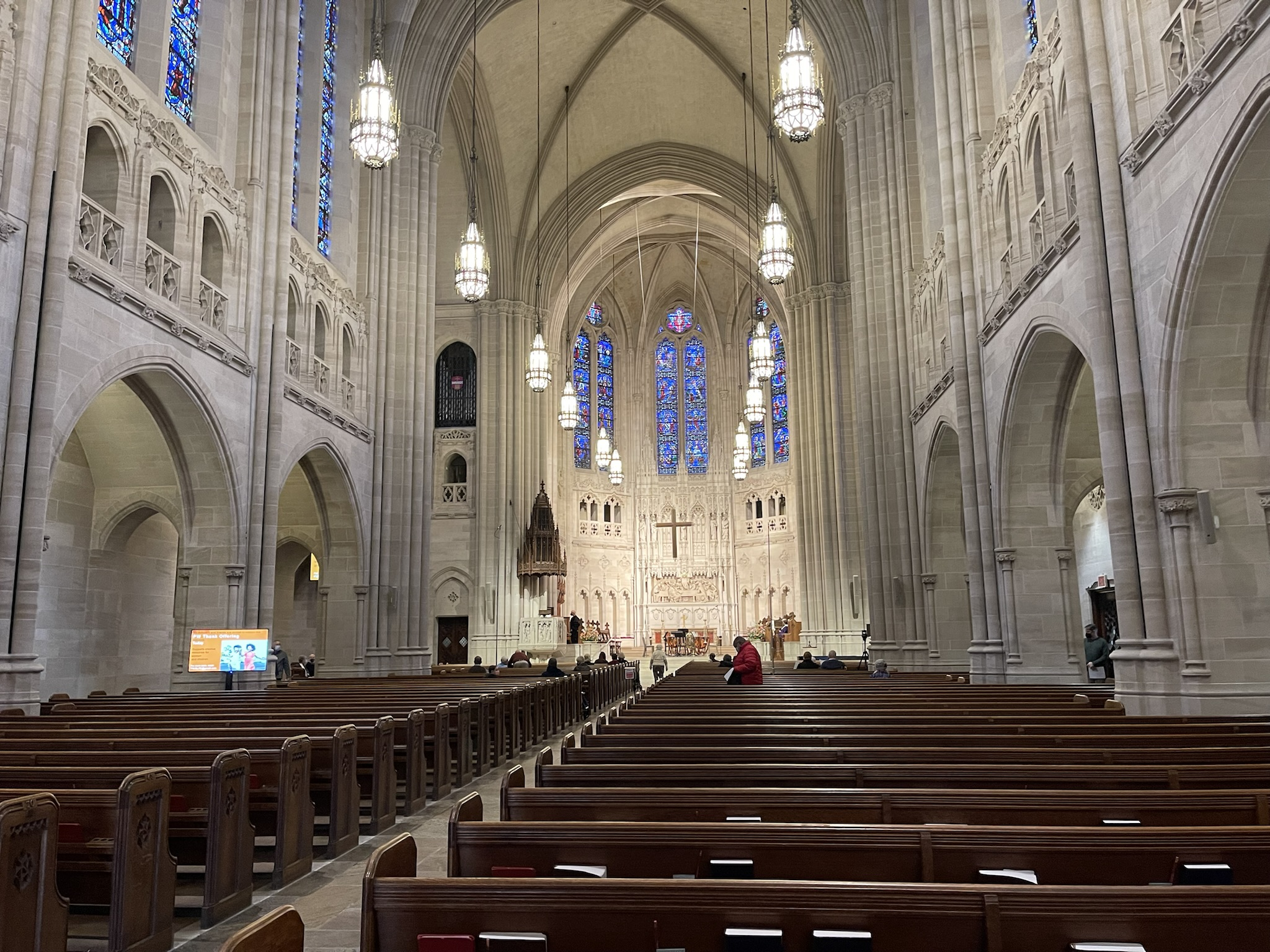
Sanctuary
