= Neil Cazares-Thomas =

American Christian pastor (born 1966)

Neil G. Cazares-Thomas
- Born: April 16, 1966 (age 59)
- Occupation: Christian pastor
- Known for: LGBTQ social activism

Neil G. Cazares-Thomas (born April 16, 1966) is the senior pastor of the Cathedral of Hope in Dallas, Texas, the world's largest liberal Christian church with a primary outreach to lesbian, gay, bisexual, and transgender people. Cazares-Thomas is a former senior pastor of the Founders Metropolitan Community Church in Los Angeles, California.

== Life and ministry ==
A native of Bournemouth, England, Cazares-Thomas was born into the Church of Jesus Christ of Latter-day Saints, but his family left the church in his early years. On his fifteenth birthday, he joined the Metropolitan Community Churches, an international movement of churches primarily reaching out to the LGBTQ community. He attended St John's Theological College, La Sainte Union, and King Alfred's College and graduated with a BA. Following ordination, Cazares-Thomas served as the senior pastor of the Metropolitan Community Church in Bournemouth for twelve years.

In 2002, he moved to Los Angeles to serve as senior pastor of Founders Metropolitan Community Church. He graduated with a Doctor of Ministry degree from the San Francisco Theological Seminary in 2009 and was later appointed an adjunct professor at the Claremont School of Theology. On April 12, 2015, Cazares-Thomas was elected senior pastor by the 4,500-member congregation of the Cathedral of Hope in Dallas, Texas.

== Social activism ==
Cazares-Thomas is known for his social activism, having been instrumental in developing feeding programs for the homeless, night and day shelters, safe sex initiatives, establishing relations with police, challenging discriminatory laws, and providing LGBTQ youth services, including his "Over the Rainbow" initiative, a drop-in center founded during the AIDS pandemic offering counseling, support, and information. He has served as chaplain to the Mayor of Bournemouth, the Sanctuary (an HIV/AIDS hospice), a women's refuge, and five drug and alcohol rehab houses. He is a past president of California Faith for Equality and the Los Angeles LGBTQI Clergy Council.

== Honors ==
In 1998, Cazares-Thomas was invited by Queen Elizabeth II to attend a garden party at Buckingham Palace in recognition of his work in the Bournemouth community. In June 2010, he was presented with the Harvey Milk Award, and in July of that year, he was honored by his denomination with the Ecumenical Award.

== Other work ==
Cazares-Thomas is a contributing author of Daring to Speak Love's Name (Penguin Books, 1993), From Queer to Eternity (Cassell, 1997), and The Queer Bible Commentary (SCM Press, 2006).
