= The Bricker Building =

Historic mixed-use building in Los Angeles, California

- U.S. National Register of Historic Places
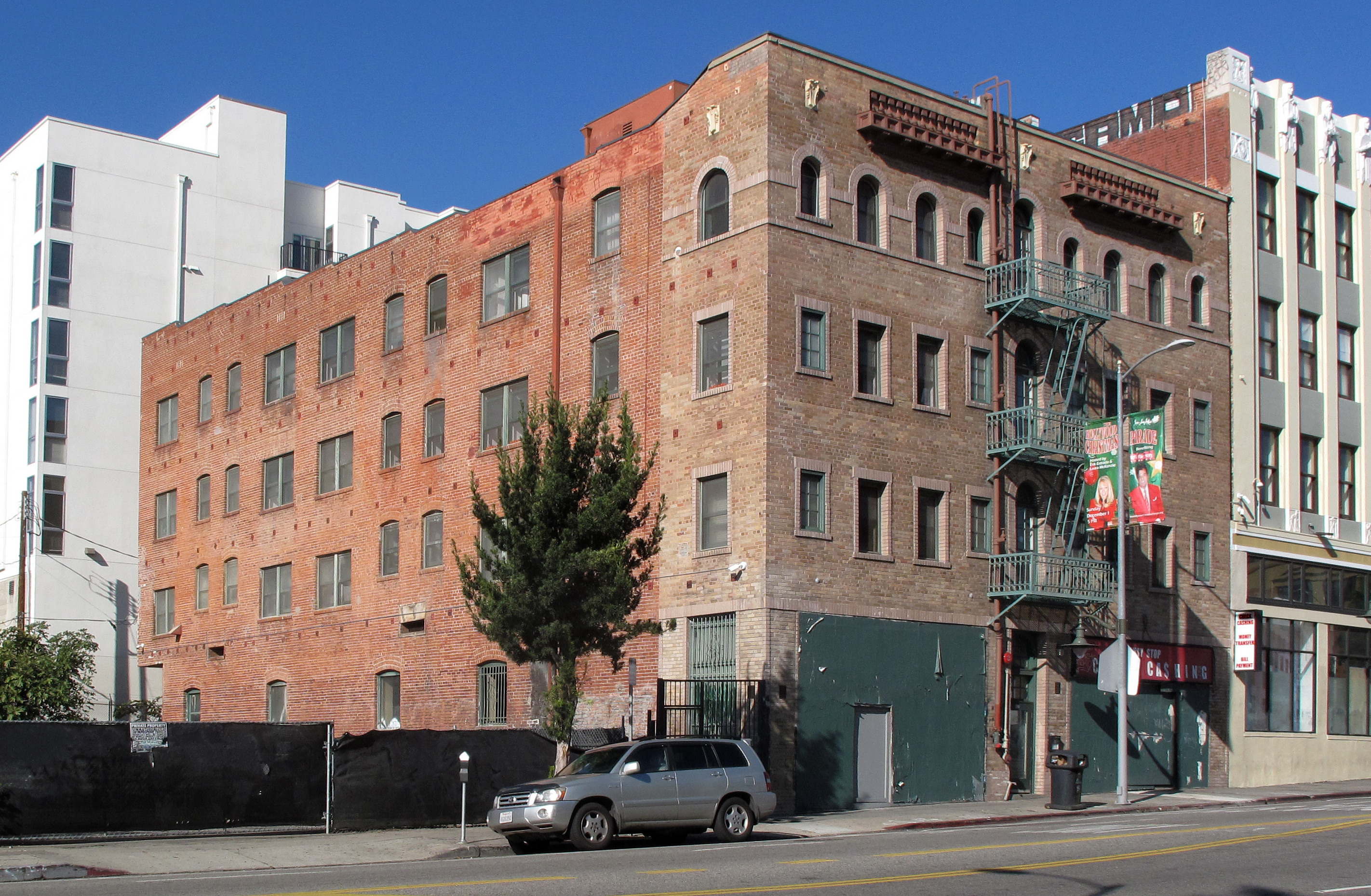
- The building in 2019

- Location within the Los Angeles metropolitan area
- Location: 1671 N. Western Avenue, East Hollywood, Los Angeles, California
- Coordinates: 34.1012°N 118.3095°W
- Built: 1924
- Architect: Alfredo Larin or Arthur Lindley and Charles Selkirk
- Architectural style: Italian Renaissance Revival
- NRHP reference No.: 10001119
- Added to NRHP: January 7, 2011

The Bricker Building is a historic building located at 1671 N. Western Avenue in East Hollywood, Los Angeles, California. Built in 1924, it was added to the National Register of Historic Places in 2011.

== History ==
The Bricker Building, built in 1924, was designed by either Alfredo Larin or Arthur Lindley and Charles Selkirk.

In 2007, building's owners received $1.26 million ($1.96 million in 2025) in loans to rehabilitate the building into affordable housing. In 2010, the building owners completed an $8.1 million ($12 million in 2025) Historic Preservation Tax Credit.

The building was added to the National Register of Historic Places on January 7, 2011.

== Architecture and design ==
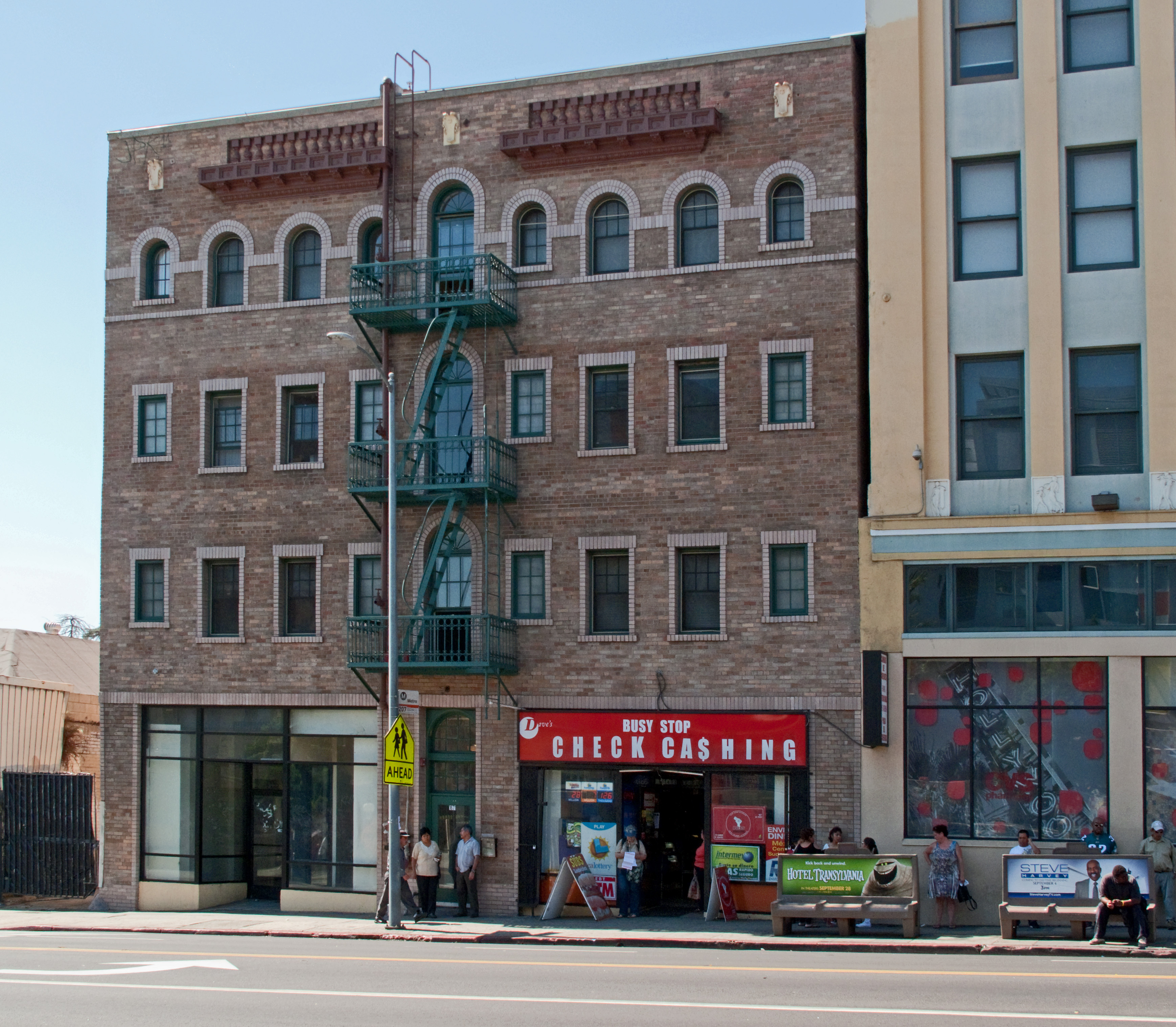
Front of the Building

The Bricker Building features an Italian Renaissance Revival design and contains sixteen dwelling units and 4,810 square feet (447 m^{2}) of retail space. The City of Los Angeles considers the building an "excellent example of an early mixed-use building in Hollywood."
