= LGBTQ topics in Georgia =

LGBTQ in Georgia may refer to:

- LGBTQ rights in Georgia
  - LGBTQ rights in Georgia (country)
  - LGBTQ rights in Georgia (U.S. state)
- LGBTQ history in Georgia
  - LGBTQ history in Georgia (country)
  - LGBTQ history in Georgia (U.S. state)
- Same-sex marriage in Georgia
  - Same-sex marriage in Georgia (U.S. state)
  - Same-sex marriage in Georgia (country)
  - Same-sex marriage in South Georgia and the South Sandwich Islands
