= Brian Fricke =

American Marine sergeant (born 1981)

- Born: November 1981 (age 44); Georgia
- Occupation: Cyber security / IT Specialist
- Employer: US Department of Defense
- Known for: Cyber Security and former US Marine fighting the DADT policy
- Political party: Democratic
- Board member of: SLDN 2008-2012
- Spouse: Brad Catoe since 2010
- Partner: Brad Catoe since 2003

Notes
- Medals include: *Iraq Campaign *Global War On Terrorism Service *Global War On Terrorism Expeditionary *Good Conduct Service *Navy and Marine Corps Achievement x2 *National Defense

Brian Fricke (born November 19, 1981, in Albany, Georgia) is an Iraq War veteran, former U.S. Marine Corps Sergeant, Certified Information Systems Security Professional (CISSP), and was a civil rights activist who served on the board of the Servicemembers Legal Defense Network (SLDN), 2008 to 2012.

== Early life ==
Born an only child, Fricke was raised in Knoxville, Tennessee, by his mother and father in a Non-denominational Christian home. He participated in football, baseball, basketball and soccer growing up. Brian was in the scouts at a young age and through his high school years attained the rank of Corporal with the Knox County Sheriff Explorers.

As of 2014, Brian Fricke will hold a Master of Business Administration from the George Washington University, a Master's Certificate in Strategic Cyber Security Enforcement from the George Washington University, and a Bachelor of Science in Homeland Security Management from National University, California.

== Military service ==
Fricke enlisted in the U.S. Marine Corps his Junior year of School, entering the Delayed Entry Program at age 18. He graduated Marine Corps Recruit Training in Parris Island, SC, October 2000, attaining the rank of Private First Class. After follow-on training at Marine Combat Training in Camp Geiger, he attended Aviation Electrician's Mate School at Naval Air Station Pensacola. He then attended follow-on school for the CH-53E Super Stallion Helicopter at MCAS New River.

Having attained Lance Corporal and being sent to his first fleet command aboard MCAS Miramar, Fricke worked with HMH-361 briefly until transferred to HMH-466 for a deployment to MCAS Futenma in Okinawa, Japan. He was promoted to Corporal and was transferred from the Avionics shop into the Quality Assurance Division. Corporal Fricke received his first Navy and Marine Corps Achievement Medal (NAM) upon return from the deployment to the United States. He was able to get the entire Squadron's computer network infrastructure back online, acting as an impromptu liaison between his squadron and the higher MAG 16 S-6 Command. This began his transition into Information Technology.

February 2004 Corporal Fricke deployed to Iraq aboard Al Asad Airbase with his unit in support of Operation Iraqi Freedom II and was again functioning largely in an S-6 (Network Administrator) capacity for the unit. He also augmented the air crew, flying about a half dozen sorties. He served in Iraq for 9 months returning to the US (being promoted to Sergeant while en route) in September 2004. He was awarded another NAM after a Wing inspection. He served in the QA Staff Billet, serving as the S-6 liaison until his End of Service.

Sergeant Fricke chose not to re-enlist because the Don't Ask Don't Tell policy did not allow him to be open about his homosexuality and partner and received an Honorable Discharge in 2005.

== Cyber security career ==
Having worked in the computer science field while serving the Marines, He moved to Washington, DC, where he became a federal employee as an IT Specialist. He has since worked for USAID/OIG, U.S. Securities and Exchange Commission (SEC) in New York, and is currently with the Dept of the Navy Military Sealift Command. He serves as the IT Service Management Branch Manager.

== Publications ==
- CIO Magazine Article.
