= Lizzie Fricker =

Oxford fellow

Lizzie Fricker is a fellow and tutor at Magdalen College, Oxford, and lectures in the Faculty of Philosophy, Oxford. Her research interests are in philosophy of language, philosophy of mind and theory of knowledge.

She has made contributions to the discussion of the Philosophical problems of testimony and self-knowledge.

== Select publications ==
- Second-Hand Knowledge. Philosophy and Phenomenological Research 73 (3) (2006)
- Self-Knowledge: Special Access Vs. Artefact of Grammar—A Dichotomy Rejected. In C. Wright, B. Smith, C. Macdonald & 1998 Self-knowledge: Special access vs. artefact of grammar—A dichotomy rejected. (eds.), Knowing Our Own Minds. Oxford University Press (1998)
- Critical Notice: Telling and Trusting: Reductionism and Anti-Reductionism in the Epistemology of Testimony. Mind 104 (414) (1995)
- The Threat of Eliminativism. Mind and Language 8 (2) (1993)
