= Delayed Entry Program =

Program for new enlistees in the U.S. Armed Forces

The Delayed Entry Program (DEP, also called the Delayed Enlistment Program or Future Soldiers Program in the United States) is a program designed to accommodate new enlistees into the United States Armed Forces before they ship out to basic training. Enlistees first enter the DEP as inactive reservists, then make a commitment to report for training on a specified date. However, they do not become active-duty servicemembers until they formally enlist as such on that date. (Note: "Members of the recruiting force must respond positively to any inquiry from FSs concerning separations from the FSP. Under no circumstances will any member of this command threaten, coerce, manipulate, or intimidate FSs, nor may they obstruct separation requests. When such an inquiry is received, local recruiting personnel will attempt to resell the FS on an Army enlistment. When an attempt is not successful (not later than 14 days from the original request), advise the FS of the provisions governing separation from the FSP and tell them a written request for separation may be forwarded to the Rctg Bn commander. Emphasize that the FS may submit a request for separation even though his or her reason for it does not fall within an expressed category, such as hardship, dependency, apathy, and/or personal reasons. A request for separation must be personally signed by the FS who initiates it. His or her request should include complete justification for separation and the documents required by AR 135-178, AR 601-210, and as outlined in appendix D of this regulation. If the FS cannot be resold, his or her Recruit Quota System (REQUEST) reservation will be canceled.")

Enlistees may use the period between signing up and shipping out to complete tasks such as graduating from high school or college, preparing physically and mentally for military life, and putting their personal affairs in order.

DEP members who change their mind and decide not to enter the military before they begin active duty will be separated with no adverse consequences. The Army DEP regulation, as an example, states that "under no circumstances will any member of [the recruiting force] threaten, coerce, manipulate, or intimidate FSs [future soldiers], nor may they obstruct separation requests" (USAREC Reg. 601-56, 3-1c).

While the DEP enlistment agreement states that the military can technically order any DEP recruit to active duty in the event that they do not fulfill their commitment by reporting to training on their specified date, no recruit has been involuntarily ordered to active duty in decades.

Enlistees in the DEP are encouraged to spend a significant amount of time at a local recruiting office and receive training from their recruiter before they ship out to begin recruit training and active service. Areas that are covered during this phase include drill and ceremony, first aid, chain of command, rank structure, and physical training.
