= Bricker =

Bricker is a surname. Notable people with the surname include:

- Calvin Bricker, Canadian athlete
- Clifford Bricker, Canadian long-distance runner
- Erika Bricker, American swimmer
- John W. Bricker, United States Senator and Governor of Ohio
- Karl Bricker, Swiss cross country skier
- Pam Bricker, jazz singer
- Victoria Bricker (born 1940), American anthropologist and ethnographer

== See also ==
- Bricker Amendment, collective name of a series of proposed amendments to the United States Constitution
- Bricker end-to-side anastomosis, widely used technique for performing ureteroenteric anastomosis
- Bricker & Eckler, Ohio law firm
- The Bricker Building, historic building in Los Angeles, California, USA.
