= John Cameron Lowrie =

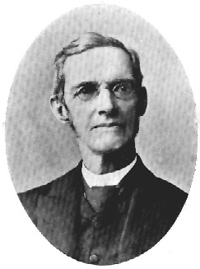
- Born: December 16, 1808
- Died: June 7, 1900 (aged 91)
- Occupation: Missionary
- Known for: Missionary

John Cameron Lowrie (1808–1900) was a Scottish-American Presbyterian missionary who spent 43 years serving in India. He was instrumental in establishing and developing mission stations, schools, and hospitals in the Indian subcontinent.

== Early life and education ==
Lowrie was born on November 14, 1808, in Paisley, Renfrewshire, Scotland, to John and Janet Lowrie. His father was a textile manufacturer. The family immigrated to the United States when Lowrie was 10 years old, settling in Philadelphia.

Lowrie attended Jefferson College in Canonsburg, PA, graduating in 1829 with a Bachelor of Arts degree. During his college years, he became deeply committed to Christianity and decided to pursue a career in ministry.

He then studied theology at the Princeton Theological Seminary, earning his Doctor of Divinity degree in 1833. At Princeton, Lowrie developed a strong interest in foreign missions.

=== Missionary work ===
In 1834, Lowrie was ordained as a Presbyterian minister and joined the American Board of Commissioners for Foreign Missions (ABCFM). He arrived in India on November 23, 1835, and began his missionary work in the Allahabad region. Lowrie's initial focus was on evangelism, education, and medical care. He established several mission stations, schools, and hospitals, including :

- Allahabad Mission Station (1835): Founded by Lowrie, it became a hub for missionary activities in the region.
- Muhammadan Mission (1842): Established to specifically target Muslim communities.
- Girls' School and Orphanage (1845): Provided education and care for girls.
- Allahabad Mission School (1848): Offered Western-style education to Indian students.

== Personal life ==
Lowrie married Margaret Mitchell in 1835, and they had six children together, Janet (1837–1915), John (1839–1863), Margaret (1841–1923), William (1843–1885), James (1845–1917), Robert (1847–1931). Margaret died in 1864, and Lowrie remarried to Emily J. Wilson in 1866. Lowrie retired from active missionary work in 1877 but continued to support the ABCFM. He returned to the United States in 1880 and settled in Philadelphia. John Cameron Lowrie died on June 23, 1900, at his home in Philadelphia.

=== Role in Punjab Christianity ===
In 1846, Lowrie along with William Reed arrived in Punjab, which had recently been annexed by the British East India Company. Lowrie played a crucial role in converting Punjab's first Muslim convert to Christianity, Shaikh Ibrahim, in 1853. He established the Lahore Mission in 1849, which became a hub for missionary activities in the region. Lowrie met with Maharaja Ranjit Singh, the ruler of Punjab, in 1840 for missionary work in the region. The Ludhiana Mission was established in November 1834 by John Lorrie.
