= Michael S. Piazza =

American author and activist

Michael S. Piazza is a prolific spiritual author and social justice advocate who is best known as the former senior pastor and dean of the Cathedral of Hope in Dallas, Texas, which, under his leadership, grew from approximately 350 members to more than 3,500. He currently serves as co-pastor of Progressive Spirit United Church of Christ (formerly Arlington Congregational church) in Jacksonville, Florida. Previously, he was senior pastor at historic Broadway United Church of Christ in New York City and interim pastor of First Presbyterian Church in New Canaan, CT. Before that, he served as senior pastor of Virginia Highland Church, a congregation dually affiliated with the Alliance of Baptists and the United Church of Christ.

A native of the U.S. state of Georgia, Piazza has served in ministry for more than five decades as pastor of churches in Georgia, Texas, Oklahoma, Connecticut, New York, and Florida. He holds a bachelor's degree in History from Valdosta State University in Georgia and a Master of Divinity from the Candler School of Theology, Emory University, in Atlanta. His doctoral degree is from Hartford Seminary where he is an adjunct professor of Congregational Renewal. He also is the President of Agile Church Consulting and has worked with dozens of churches around the country who were seeking revitalization. Known as something of a church growth "expert," Rev. Dr. Piazza is called upon frequently to guide congregations in an ever-changing post-COVID world.

In August 1999, The Advocate magazine named Piazza one of the most influential people in the gay and lesbian rights movement and he was honored by Pacific School of Religion with its "Leading Voice" award for his social justice work on behalf of lesbian, gay, bisexual, and transgender people. His published books include "Liberating the Gospel"; "Liberating Word, A Daily Reflection for Liberals, Volume One: The First Testament"; "Gay by God: How to be Lesbian or Gay and Christian" (formerly "Holy Homosexuals"); "Queeries: Questions Lesbians and Gays have for God"; "The Real antiChrist: How America Sold its Soul"; "Prophetic Renewal: Hope for the Liberal Church," designed to help restore vitality to liberal congregations; and "Liberating Hope: Daring to Renew the Mainline Church" (co-author); "Vital Vintage Church"; and "Fishing in a Shallow Sea."

Piazza and his first husband, Bill Eure, met in 1980 and were married in a religious ceremony in 1981. After same-gender marriage was made the law of the land in 2015, Michael and Bill were joined legally on their 35th anniversary in November 2015. Together, they raised two daughters. Eure died in July 2016 after a brief battle with cancer. Piazza remarried in 2022 to David Plunkett, a longtime partner in ministry and now life.
