= Cathedral of Hope (Dallas) =

United Church of Christ congregation in Dallas, Texas

Coordinates: 32.828466°N 96.833056°W

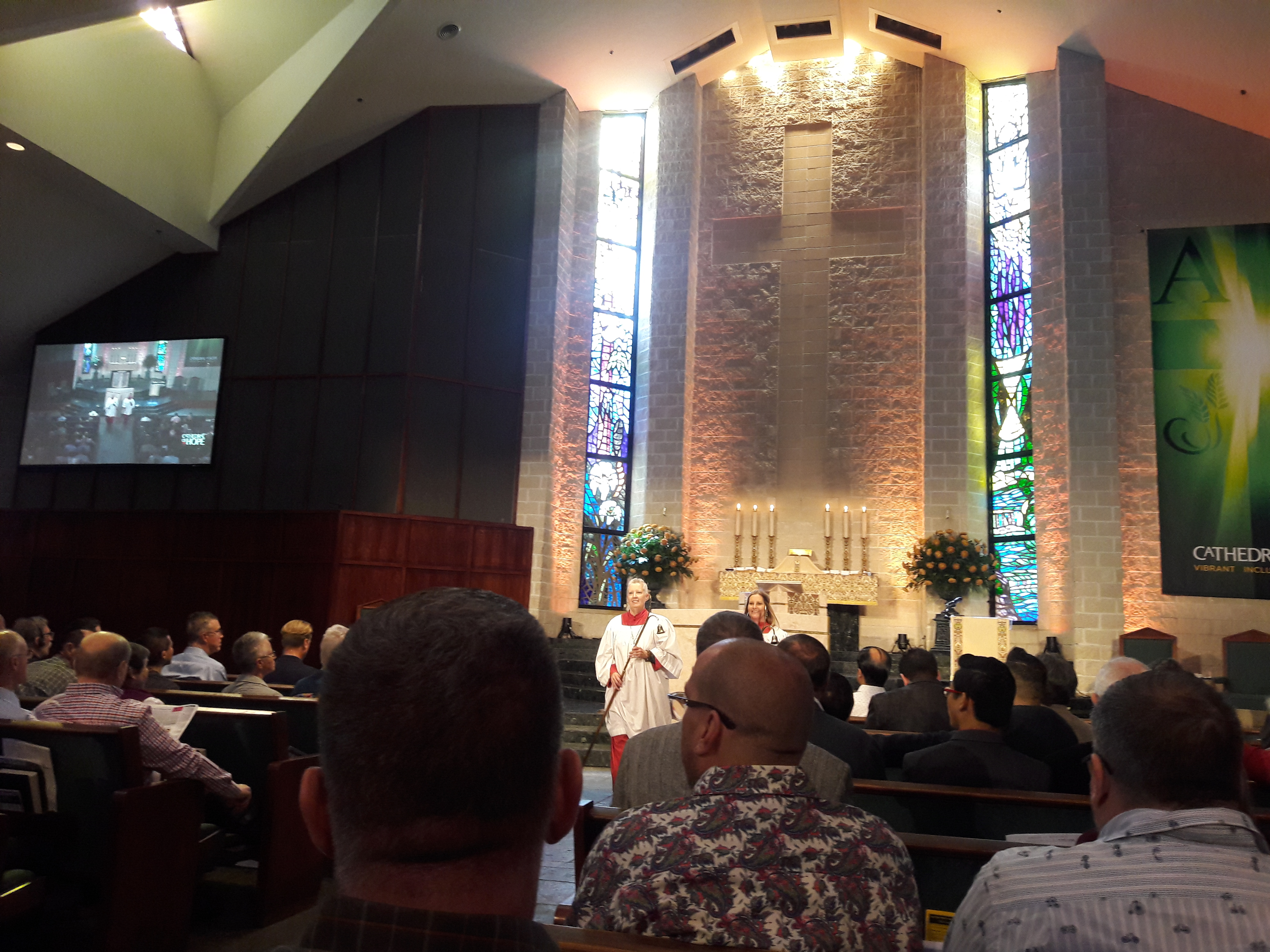
- The interior of the church in 2019

Religion
- Affiliation: United Church of Christ (current); Metropolitan Community Church (former)
- Leadership: Neil Cazares-Thomas
- Status: Active

Location
- Location: 5910 Cedar Springs Road; Dallas, Texas, U.S.
- Interactive map of Cathedral of Hope

Architecture
- Completed: 1993

Website
- cathedralofhope.com

The Cathedral of Hope (CoH), a member congregation of the United Church of Christ, is a historically and predominantly LGBTQ congregation located in the Oak Lawn area of Dallas, Texas, in the United States. The Dallas Cathedral of Hope is said to be the world's largest inclusive "liberal Christian church with a primary outreach to lesbian, gay, bisexual and transgender people", with a membership of over 4,000 local members.

The current building, built in 1993, is complemented with the 78-foot tall John Thomas Memorial Bell Wall commemorating HIV/AIDS victims. The Bell Wall was designed by Philip Johnson as part of a larger campus project. Donald Bruce Kaufman was consulted for the color painting of the exterior. The physical building, symbolic of the liberal Christian faith that it hosts, is found in a considerably more conservative surrounding area. The education building was completed in 2002, at a construction cost of approximately $20 million. The current Sanctuary can accommodate up to 1,200 worshippers at once. A new proposal for postmodern cathedral was designed by Philip Cortelyou Johnson and has not been built yet, even after it was revised five times from the first design by the architect at the request of the Rev. Michael Piazza, then dean of the cathedral.

Rev. Piazza was the senior pastor for nearly twenty years between the late 1980s and 1990s. He oversaw the largest growth in the church's history, from 250 members to more than 3,000, while ministering through the AIDS crisis.

The church's national outreach program reaches a further online audience nationwide. The Cathedral of Hope joined the United Church of Christ in February 2007, having previously been the flagship congregation of the Universal Fellowship of Metropolitan Community Churches. In November 2009, construction was commenced on the Cathedral of Hope's Interfaith Peace Chapel, designed by the prominent architect Philip Johnson (Alan Ritchie Architects). Dedication of the building was on November 7, 2010. The Rev. Dr. Neil Thomas has been the cathedral's senior pastor since May 2015 and has expanded the church's outreach to include a food pantry that serves over 300 people every week.

== History ==
On July 30, 1970, a group of twelve people gathered at a home at 4612 Victor Street in Dallas to discuss establishing a Metropolitan Community Church congregation. In May 1971, Richard Vincent was elected as the first pastor of MCC-Dallas. The group worshiped in homes for the first year and a half, using a coffee table as an altar.

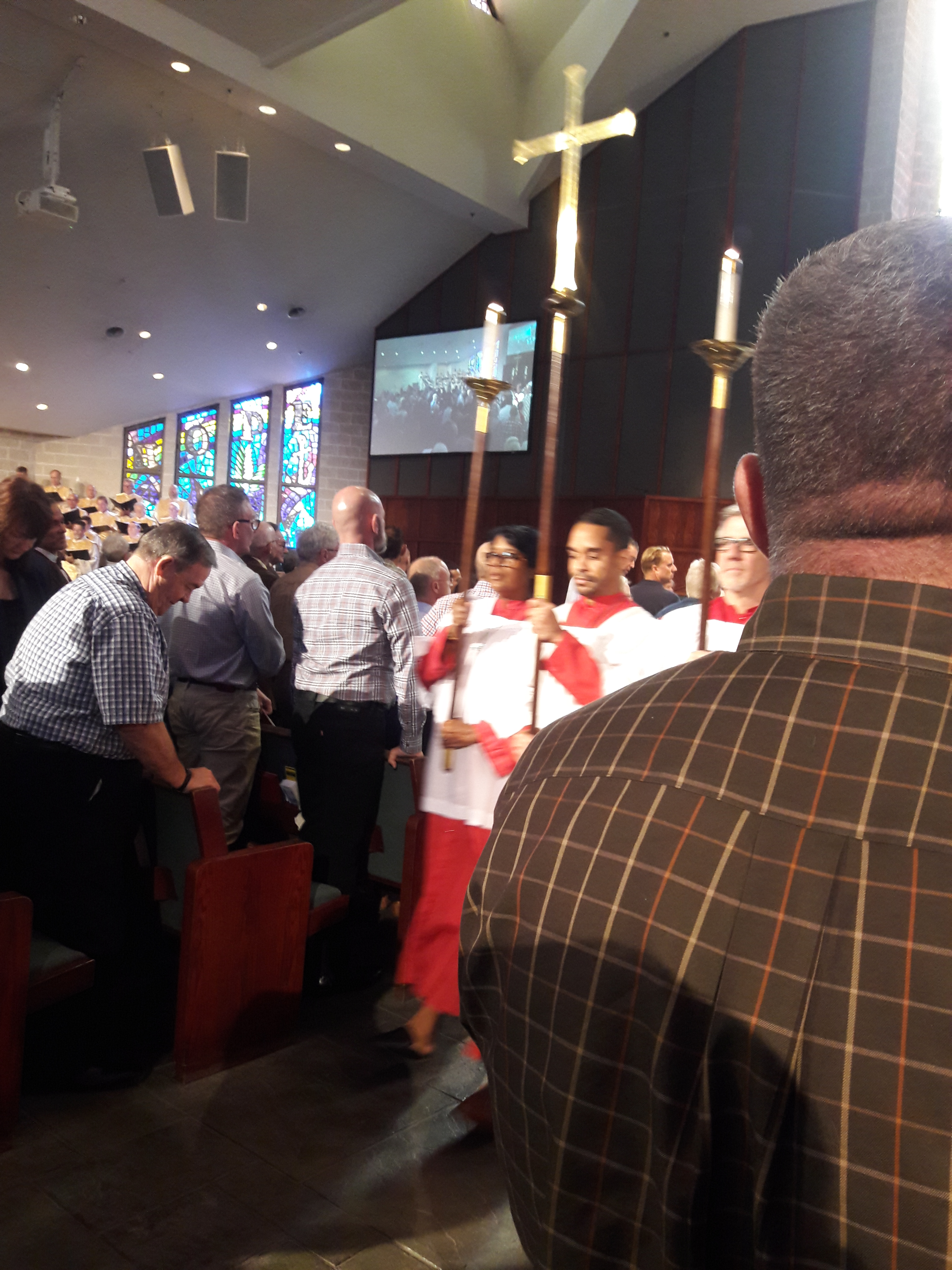
2019 The cathedral of hope dallas church (17)

In 1972, MCC-Dallas moved into its first church home at 3834 Ross Avenue. The building had been originally built as a small private hospital in the 1920s. In 1974, James Harris was elected as the church's second pastor. On October 4, 1976, MCC-Dallas purchased a former Church of Christ building at 2701 Regan, Dallas.

In November 1977, Don Eastman was elected as the church's third pastor. At this time, the membership had grown to almost 400. Michael Piazza was elected senior pastor in November 1987 bringing in new members attracted by Piazza's preaching. Membership grew to 600.

In late 1990, MCC-Dallas became the Cathedral of Hope MCC to reflect a new broader mission to reach out LGBT people everywhere with a message of hope. The church began its "Pink-Period" quest to build a larger church to accommodate a growing congregation. This new home was completed in 1992. That same year, the Christmas Eve service was broadcast on CNN. The congregation now approached 1,000 members. During 1993 the cathedral grows by a record 300 members.

The Cathedral of Hope in 1995 commissioned the prominent architect Philip Johnson to design a new cathedral campus.

Membership grew to over 2,300 by 1998 and the cathedral served a rapidly growing congregation of more than 3,000. In 1999, CoH-TV begins hosting live Internet worship services via the cathedral's website.

In 2000, the Cathedral of Hope began the "Century of Compassion" by donating more than one million dollars in direct assistance and volunteer community support annually. On July 30, 2000, the John Thomas Bell Wall, a National AIDS Memorial, was dedicated. The church saw more than 1,500 AIDS funerals and memorial services.

On August 6, 2000, nearly 100 people attended the inaugural worship service at the Cathedral of Hope – Oklahoma City.

On July 28, 2002, the newly completed 22,000-square-foot (2,000 m^{2}) Congregational Life Center was dedicated. It featured new classrooms for children and youth, renovated office space for the Hope Counseling Center and expanded office space for cathedral staff. The close of 2002 saw a local and national membership of nearly 4,000.

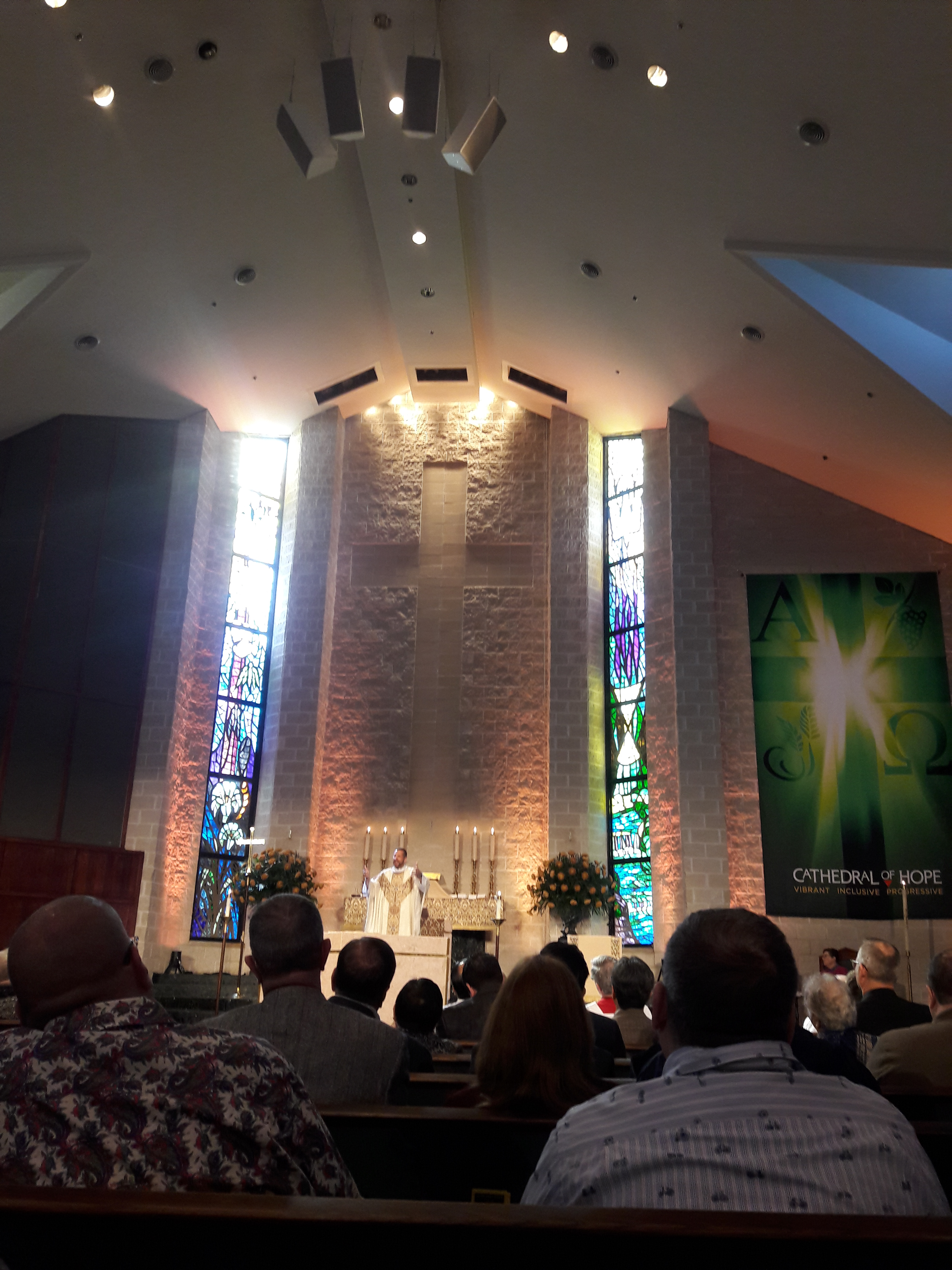
2019 The cathedral of hope dallas church (24)

In 2003, a group calling themselves the Cathedral of Hope Reform was formed, led by church member Terri Frey. In April 2003, Frey filed a complaint with MCC that prompted the Universal Fellowship of Metropolitan Community Churches to open an investigation against Michael Piazza. In July 2003, believing the investigators had overstepped their bounds, the church's board called for a vote to disaffiliate from the denomination, which passed with 88 percent support, effectively ending the UFMCC investigation. Piazza took a three-month sabbatical after the vote. Half of those who voted to remain affiliated with the MCC denomination formed their own church known as MCC of Greater Dallas with pastor Cindi Love.

On February 6, 2005, Jo Hudson was elected as senior pastor of the Cathedral of Hope. Michael Piazza became dean of the cathedral. In 2005, the church celebrated 35 years of ministry and activism. It launched a capital campaign to build the next phase of Philip Johnson's campus design, an interfaith peace chapel. The church launched a new non-profit organization, Hope for Peace & Justice, with Michael Piazza as president.

In October 2006, the Cathedral of Hope was granted standing by the North Texas Association of the United Church of Christ (UCC) as a member congregation, becoming the fourth largest congregation in the denomination.

The Cathedral of Hope's Interfaith Peace Chapel began construction in 2009 and was completed in November 2010.

In July 2010 the Cathedral of Hope's 4000 members celebrated its 40th anniversary.

Jo Hudson resigned to pursue other ministry opportunities on May 19, 2013. Jim Mitulski became the interim senior pastor on August 1.

After a year long search process, Neil Cazares-Thomas became the new pastor on May 24, 2015, after active service in the Metropolitan Community Church of Bournemouth, England, and Founders MCC, Los Angeles.

In July 2015, the Cathedral of Hope celebrated its 45th anniversary. In 2019, the Houston campus, led by Lester Jackson, merged with St. Peter Lutheran Church (a historically German-speaking congregation) to become St. Peter United Church of Christ.

== Pastors ==
- 1971–1974: Richard Vincent
- 1974–1977: James Harris
- 1977–1987: Don Eastman
- 1987–2003: Michael S. Piazza
- 2005–2013: Jo Hudson
- 2013–2014: Jim Mitulski
- 2015–present: Neil Cazares-Thomas

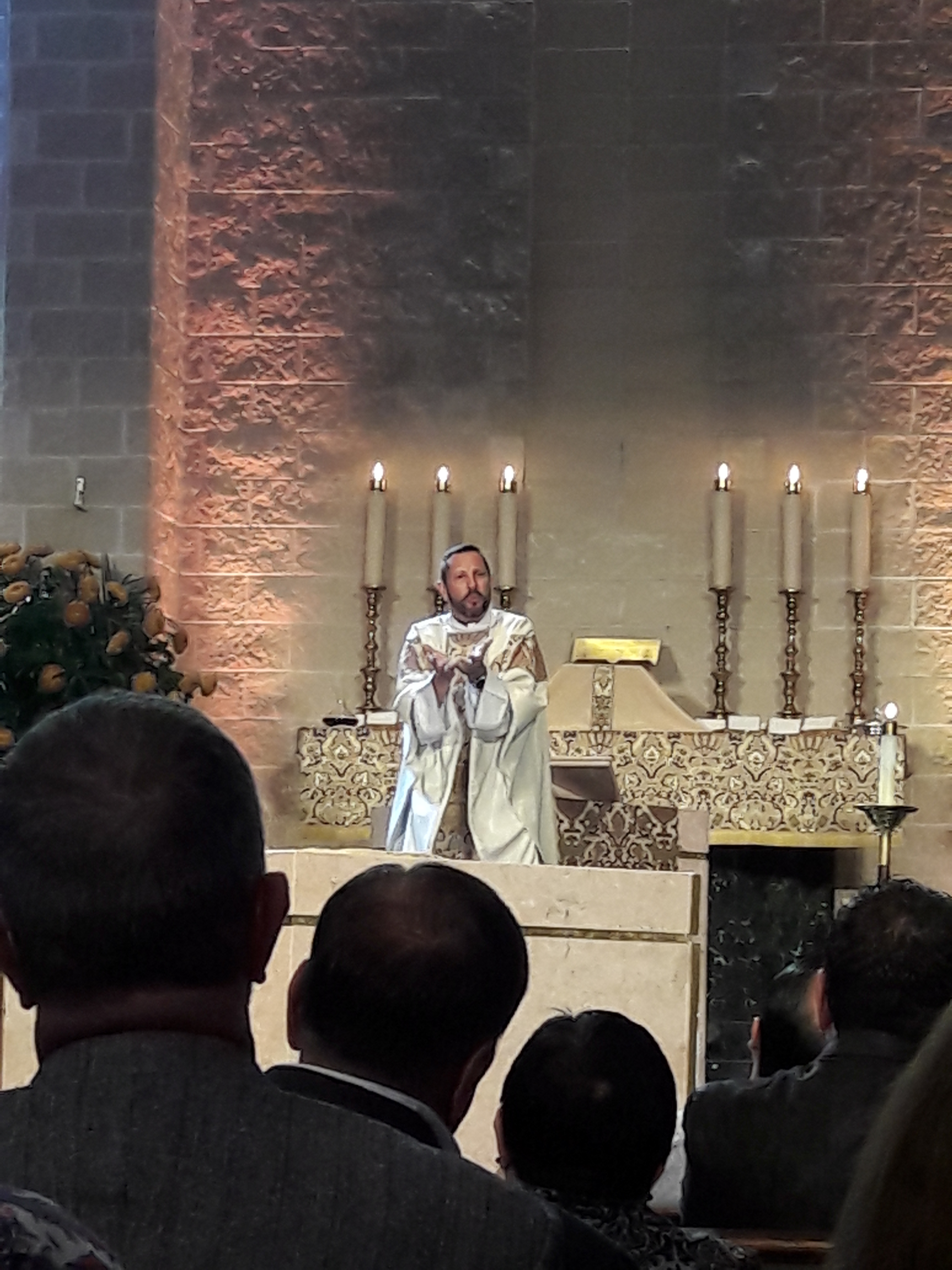
2019 The cathedral of hope dallas church (20)

== Charity work ==
The main Dallas congregation is involved in multiple charitable programs through its Dallas Hope Charities initiative. iCare is a program utilizing volunteers who serve lunch to the needy each Monday, as well as giving out donated food, toiletries, and sundries from the cathedral's food pantry to those who are also in need, in conjunction with the lunch. BACH (Breakfast at Cathedral of Hope) is a weekly breakfast served to the needy each Saturday morning. On several occasions, the iCare and BACH meals are accompanied by haircutting and also medical testing of vital signs by a visiting medical professional. A monthly Pack the Pantry night on the last Sunday of the month occurs when volunteers gather for collection and organization of donated food items for the cathedral's food pantry.

== See also ==
- List of Christian denominations affirming LGBT
